= Timeline of the Libyan civil war (2011) =

The course of the war. Held by anti-Gaddafi forces by 1 March. (Checkered: Lost before UN intervention) Contested areas between March and August. Rebel western coastal offensive in August. Rebel gains by 1 October. Last loyalist pockets. Major campaigns. battles.

The timeline of the Libyan civil war begins on 15 February 2011 and ends on 20 October 2011. The conflict began with a series of peaceful protests, similar to others of the Arab Spring, later becoming a full-scale civil war between the forces loyal to Muammar Gaddafi's government and the anti-Gaddafi forces. The conflict can roughly be divided into two periods before and after external military intervention authorized by United Nations Security Council Resolution 1973.

Held by anti-Gaddafi protesters by 1 March. (Checkered: Loyalists gains before UN intervention.) Retaken by rebels after the UN intervention. (Checkered: Contested region between late March and August). Rebel advances during September. Last loyalist pockets. Dates for changes of hand of individual towns are given in red (rebel offensive) and green (government offensive).

Held by anti-Gaddafi protesters by 1 March. (Checkered: Maximum Loyalists gains, April–May.) Rebel advances by 1 August. Rebel gains after the western coastal offensive in August. Last loyalist pockets. Dates for changes of hand of individual towns are given in red (rebel offensive) and green (government offensive).

== Before military intervention ==
Active resistance to the government began in Benghazi on 18 February, after three days of protests. Security forces had killed fourteen protesters the previous day, and a funeral procession for one of those killed passed the Katiba compound, where clashes erupted. Demonstrators threw rocks at security forces, who used live ammunition, killing twenty-four protesters. Two of the policemen who had participated in the clash were caught and hanged by protesters.

On 19 February, another funeral procession passed the Katiba compound, and were again fired on. Fighting broke out, and opposition forces commandeered bulldozers and tried to breach the walls of the Katiba compound, but were met with withering fire. Protesters also used stones and crude bombs made of tin cans stuffed with gunpowder. As the fighting continued, a mob attacked an army base on the outskirts of Benghazi and disarmed the soldiers. Among the equipment confiscated were three small tanks, which were rammed into the compound. The fighting stopped on 20 February, and another thirty people had been killed during the previous twenty-four hours of fighting.

By 20 February, violent clashes also broke out in Misrata between government forces and demonstrators. A third funeral procession passed the compound, and under the cover of the funeral, a man named Mahdi Ziu sacrificed himself by blowing up his car loaded with propane tanks with makeshift explosives and destroying the compound's gates. Opposition fighters resumed their assault, bolstered by reinforcements from Bayda and Derna. During the final assault, forty-two people were killed. Libyan Interior Minister Abdul Fatah Younis showed up with a special forces squad to relieve the compound, but Younis defected to the opposition and announced safe passage for loyalists out of the city. Gaddafi's troops retreated after executing 130 soldiers who had refused to fire on the rebels. On 22 February 2011, Gaddafi mentioned China's 1989 Tiananmen Square massacre which militarily crushed the democratic movement led by students and threatened widespread killings against dissidents in an appearance on state television as the revolt against his regime consolidated its grip on the eastern half of the country and spread to the suburbs of Tripoli. On 23 February, after five days of fighting, rebels also drove out government forces from Misrata. The following day, Gaddafi loyalists attempted to retake Misrata Airport, but were driven back. Officers from a nearby Air Force Academy also mutinied and helped the opposition attack an adjacent military airbase, then disabled fighter jets at the base.

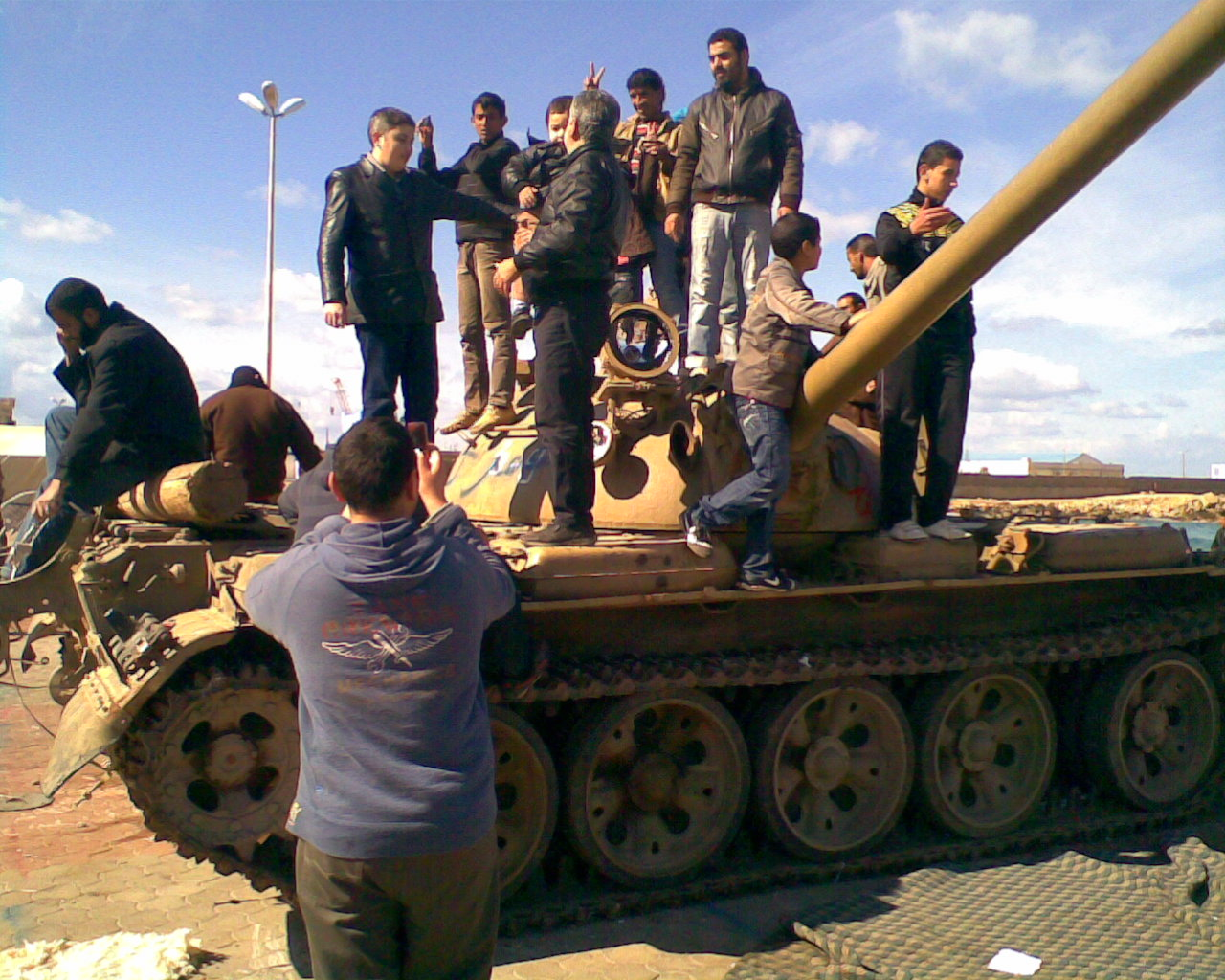
Demonstrators on an abandoned T-54/55 tank during a rally in Benghazi

By 23 February, headlines in online news services were reporting a range of themes underlining the precarious state of the regime – former justice minister Mustafa Abdul Jalil alleged that Gaddafi personally ordered the 1988 Lockerbie bombing, resignations and defections of close allies, the loss of Benghazi, the second largest city in Libya, reported to be "alive with celebration" and other cities including Tobruk, Misrata, Bayda, Zawiya, Zuwara, Sabratha and Sorman falling with some reports that the government retained control of just a few pockets, mounting international isolation and pressure, and reports that Middle East media consider the end of his regime all but inevitable. By the end of February, Gaddafi's government had lost control of a significant part of Libya, including the major cities of Misrata and Benghazi, and the important harbors at Ra's Lanuf and Brega. On the same day, rebels in Derna killed 13 loyalists and lost two dead.

In Tripoli, clashes between demonstrators and security forces took place in the center of the city, according to Al Jazeera. A doctor claimed that government forces had fired on protesters in the city. Crowds of protesters threw rocks at billboards of Gaddafi, and troops attacked them with tear gas and live fire. A resident claimed that armed security forces were positioned on rooftops surrounding Green Square, and about 200 lawyers and judges demonstrated inside a Tripoli courthouse, which was surrounded by security forces.

On 24 February, loyalist forces in Zawiya fired on a mosque where protesters were holding a sit-in, and were fired on with automatic weapons and an anti-aircraft gun. Afterward, thousands of people rallied in Martyr's Square. The same day, government forces, including tanks, launched a counterattack on Misrata airbase, engaging in battles with local residents and defecting military units, and managed to retake part of it. On 26 February, government forces fired on rebels and Egyptian migrant workers. By this point, security forces still controlled the outskirts, while rebels controlled the city. 24 rebels had been killed during the previous days of fighting. On 28 February, Gaddafi forces attacked the outskirts of the city, but were repelled, and lost 10 dead and 12–14 captured, of which eight joined the rebels. The town of Nalut, on the Tunisian border, also fell to the opposition forces. On 2 March, government forces attempted to recapture the oil port town of Brega, but the attack failed and they retreated to Ra's Lanuf. On the night on 2 March, rebels attacked government lines outside Zawiya, killing two soldiers. Rebel forces advanced following their victory and on 4 March, the opposition captured Ra's Lanuf. On the same day, government troops started a full-scale assault on Zawiya, beginning with airstrikes and a fierce mortar, artillery, rocket, anti-aircraft, and heavy machine gun barrage, and attacked the city from two sides, and managed to push into the city towards the city center. The rebels lost 50 dead and about 300 wounded, while the loyalists lost 2 dead. On 5 March, government forces were beaten back when they attempted to take the city center. Loyalist forces launched a fresh assault starting with a mortar barrage, and then attacked the city with infantry and 20 tanks. Soldiers stormed numerous buildings and killed the people inside to secure the rooftops for snipers. The loyalists initially managed to take the central square, but were forced back by a rebel counterattack several hours later. During the battle, twenty-five rebels and eight loyalists were killed. In the late afternoon, another government attack supported by an artillery barrage was stopped, but loyalists managed to secure the hospital. Ten loyalist soldiers were captured during the battle and later executed.

On 6 March, the rebel advance along the coastline was stopped by government forces in Bin Jawad. Government troops ambushed the rebel column and dozens of rebels were killed or wounded. The rebels were forced into a chaotic retreat, leaving some of their troops behind, and a rescue force was repulsed by artillery fire. As the rebels retreated, they were hit by airstrikes. When they regrouped, they moved up several multiple rocket launchers from Ra's Lanuf and engaged in an artillery duel. At least one government soldier was killed during the battle, and a helicopter was shot down. At the same time, loyalist airstrikes hit a rebel-held airbase in Ra's Lanuf, killing at least two and injuring forty. The rebels managed to establish their front line 3 kilometres (1.9 miles) from Bin Jawad. At the same time, Gaddafi's forces attempted an attack on Misrata and managed to get as far as the centre of the city before their attack was halted by rebel forces, and they retreated to the city's outskirts. A fourth attack against the Zawiya city center was launched by government troops, but it too was repulsed. Three rebels and twenty-six loyalists were killed; eleven loyalists were captured. On 9 March, rebels attempted to retake Bin Jawad, but were forced back by artillery and airstrikes.

=== Gaddafi counteroffensive ===
On 6 March, the Gaddafi regime launched a counteroffensive, retaking Ra's Lanuf as well as Brega, pushing towards Ajdabiya and again in Benghazi. Government forces also attempted to take Misrata, sending infantry and armor into the city. The loyalist forces fell into a rebel ambush after they reached the city center. In the subsequent battle, twenty-one rebels and civilians and twenty-two government soldiers were killed. A fifth government attack against rebels in Zawiya produced gains, and by 8 March, most of the city had been destroyed. During the night, rebels managed to retake the square, but the following day, they were met with a fifth counterattack. During the evening, a force of 60 rebels slipped out of the city to assault a military base, but none returned. Gaddafi remained in continuous control of Tripoli, Sirte, and Sabha, as well as several other cities.

On 9 March, Zawiya was almost completely under Gaddafi loyalists control, but rebels managed to drive them from the square during fighting in which 40 rebels and several loyalists were killed. On 10 March, France became the first country in the world to recognize the National Interim Council as Libya's only legitimate government. The same day, government forces retook Zawiya and Ra's Lanuf, supported by tanks, artillery, warplanes, and warships. Witnesses claimed that dozens of rebels were killed. Thousands of residents were subsequently questioned, with Gaddafi forces reportedly arresting anyone on the slightest suspicion of sympathy for the rebels. However, small teams of rebels continued to operate in Zawiya, launching hit-and-run attacks against loyalists, reportedly killing dozens of soldiers. On 12 March, loyalist forces launched another attack against Misrata, and were led by the elite Khamis Brigade. The force reportedly managed to fight to within 10 to 15 kilometres (6.2 to 9.3 mi) from the city centre. The attack stalled, however, after thirty-two soldiers, reportedly including a general, defected and joined the rebels.

The next day, loyalist forces were still advancing fighting rebels on the outskirts, while tank shelling hit the city. On 13 March, regime forces attacked Brega and managed to retake most of the city. By 14 March, loyalists held the oil facilities and rebels held the residential districts. By 15 March, rebel forces had been cleared out and were retreating towards Ajdabiya. The rebels lost seven killed during the battle, and claimed that loyalist casualties stood at twenty-five killed and seventy-one captured. On 14 March, loyalist forces also retook Zuwara. Four rebels were killed during the battle.

Ajdabiya, the last rebel-held city before Benghazi, had been subjected to loyalist airstrikes for three days. On 15 March, government forces launched a rolling artillery barrage coupled with airstrikes and naval shelling against the city, after which they attacked and broke through rebel defenses through a flanking maneuver. Most rebels had by then retreated from the city. After encircling the city, tanks were sent into the city center, and battled the remnants of rebel forces. Meanwhile, two Free Libyan Air Force jets attacked loyalist warships. According to independent sources, one ship was hit, but the rebels claimed that three warships were hit, two of which sank. After a few hours, the city was under government control, but armored forces pulled back to the outskirts to avoid surprise attacks, although the shelling continued.

On 16 March, fighting continued, and government troops returning from the front said that rebel resistance was fierce. Rebel reinforcements from Benghazi managed to create a small corridor through the government blockade despite resistance by loyalist forces, while rebels also managed to take the southern entrance to the city. Three Free Libyan Air Force attack helicopters attacked government reinforcements from Sirte on the highway at the western entrance. The same day, a new artillery attack and round of fighting commenced in Misrata, during which rebels claimed to have captured sixteen tanks and twenty soldiers. During the fighting, eighteen rebels were killed and 20 wounded, and from sixty to eighty government soldiers were killed. On 17 March, however, loyalists recaptured the southern entrance, and closed the corridor on the eastern side of the city. The city was once again firmly surrounded.

Meanwhile, government forces launched an amphibious operation against Zuwetina, along the Ajdabiya-Benghazi road. Loyalist troops landing on the town's coastline quickly captured it. According to the rebels, the government forces were then surrounded by the rebels, and the next day, the rebels claimed that several of their fighters and a number of civilians were killed, and twenty government soldiers captured. On the night of 17 March, loyalist forces launched an artillery and tank attack against Misrata, and the attack continued well into the next day.

US Ambassador to the United Nations Susan Rice, together with Samantha Power and US Secretary of State Hillary Clinton, persuaded US President Barack Obama to support intervention in Libya.

=== United Nations intervention ===
On 17 March, the United Nations Security Council passed a resolution to impose a no-fly zone in Libyan airspace. As a result of the UN resolution, on 18 March, Gaddafi's government declared an immediate ceasefire, but a few hours later, Al Jazeera reported that government forces were still battling rebels. Even after the government-declared ceasefire, artillery and sniper attacks on Misrata and Ajdabiya continued, and government forces continued approaching Benghazi.

Government forces entered Benghazi with tanks on 19 March from the west and south while hundreds fled the fighting. Artillery and mortars were also fired into the city. Opposition forces managed to beat back the assault after several hours of fighting, claiming to have inflicted losses, including on heavy armor, but confirmed that they suffered 27 casualties. The same day, a Mig-23BN belonging to the Free Libyan Air Force was shot down over Benghazi, after being engaged by rebel ground forces in error. The Libyan government subsequently argued that the rebels had violated the no-fly-zone resolution by using a helicopter and a fighter jet to bomb Libyan armed forces. At the same time, loyalist forces bombarded Zintan, and tanks continued advancing towards the city.

The Libyan government was widely reported to have cut off water, electricity and communications in rebel-held Misrata, forcing residents to rely on wells and a desalination plant. The government denied the claims, stating supplies were disrupted due to the fighting.

== Conflict and military operations ==
=== Commencement of NATO operations ===
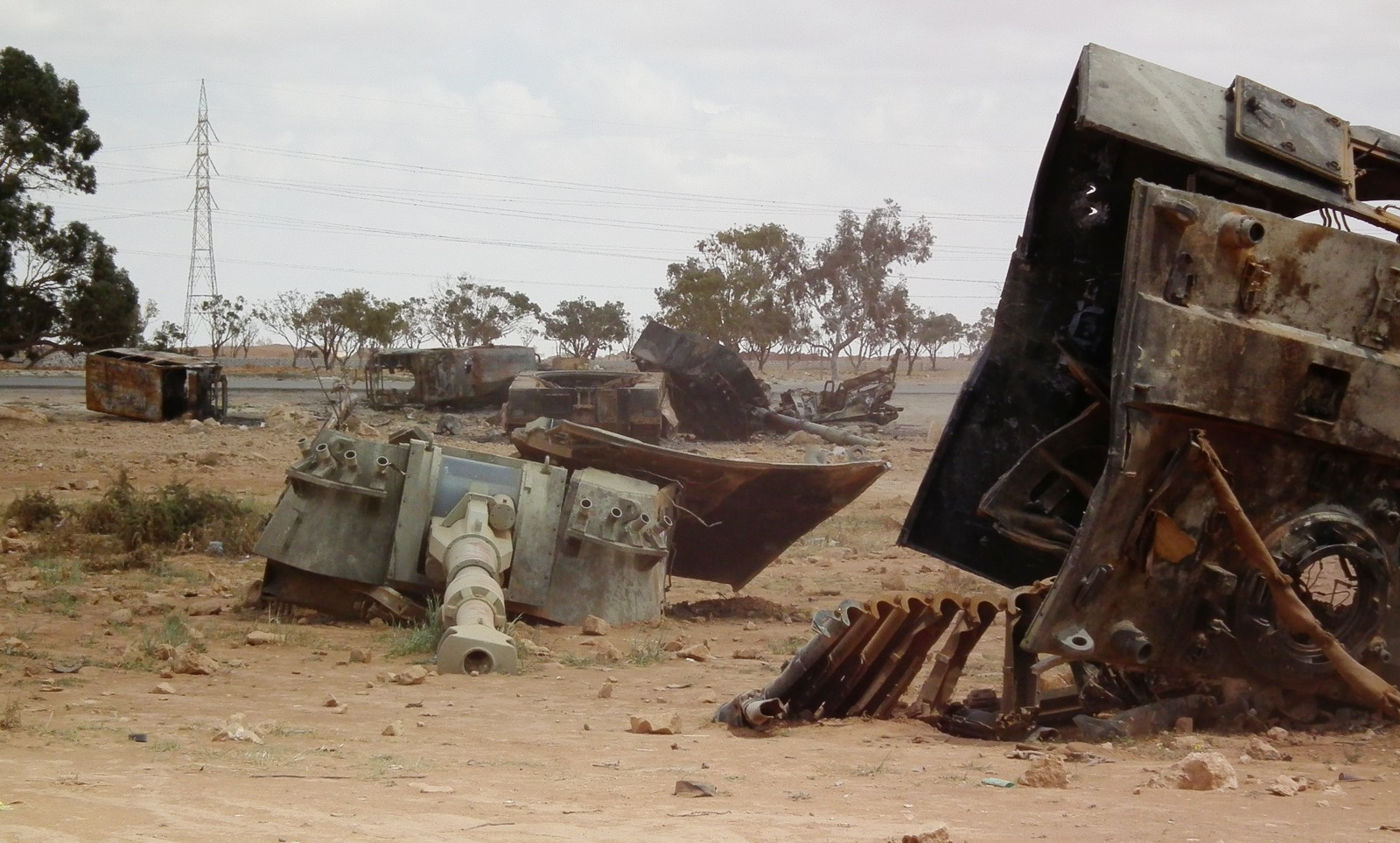
Libyan Army Palmaria howitzers destroyed by the French Air Force near Benghazi on 19 March 2011.

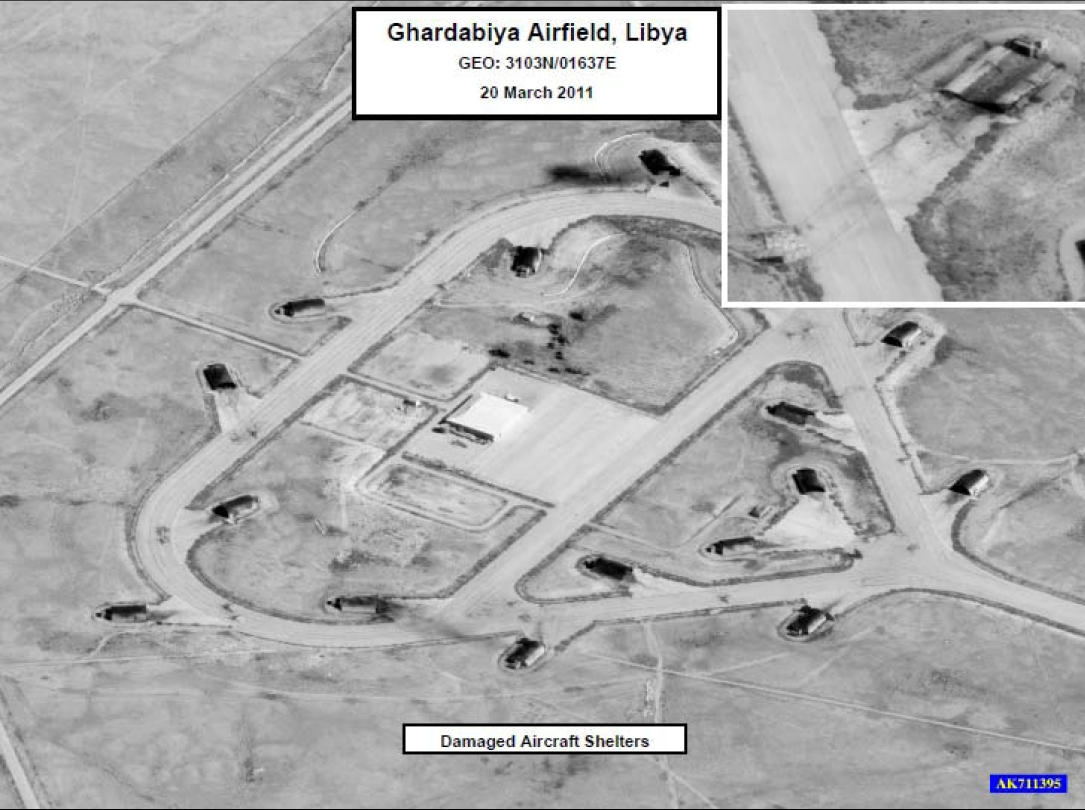
Damage to Ghardabiya Airfield following an airstrike

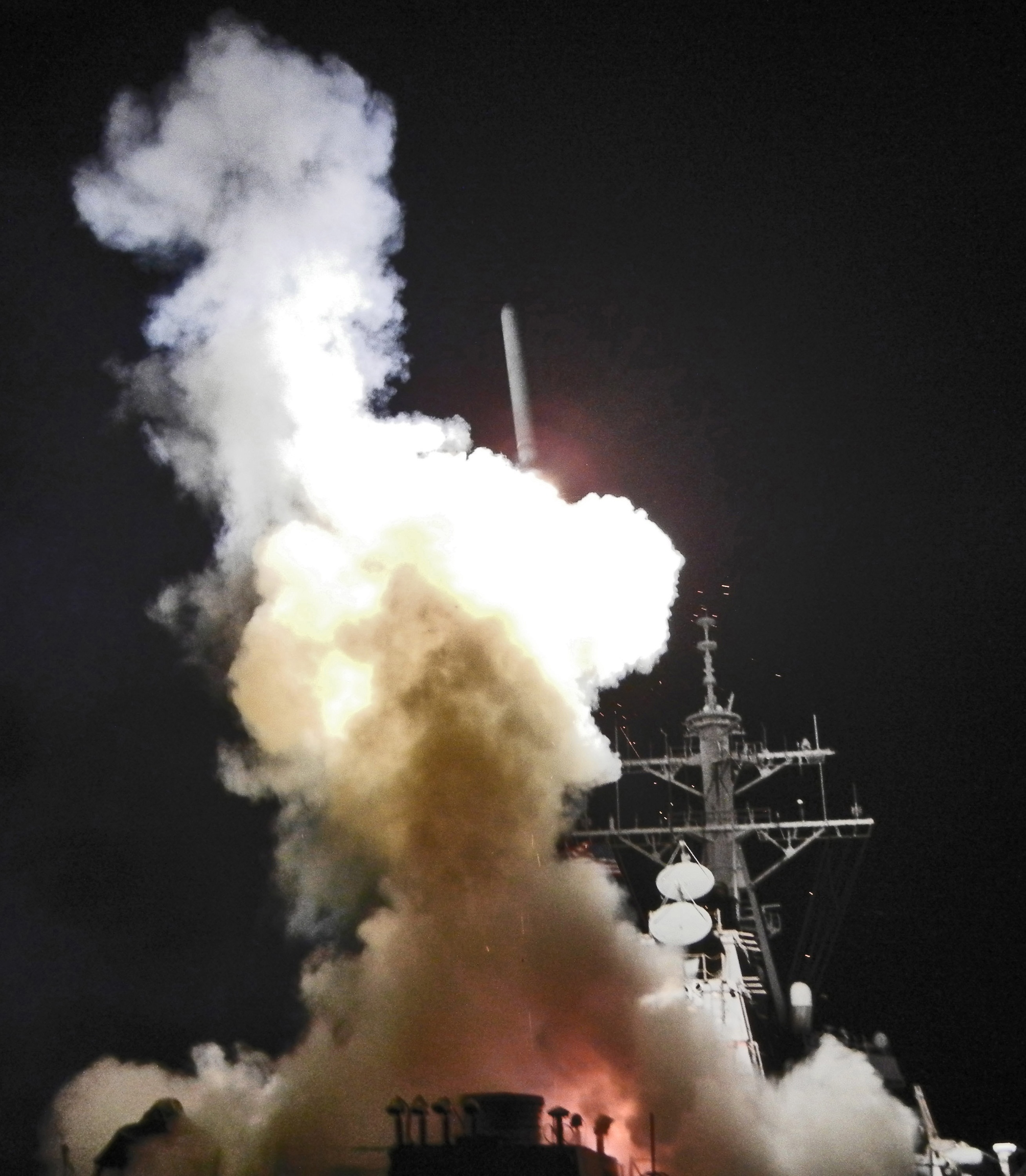
The American destroyer USS Barry launches a Tomahawk cruise missile against Libyan defenses on 19 March 2011

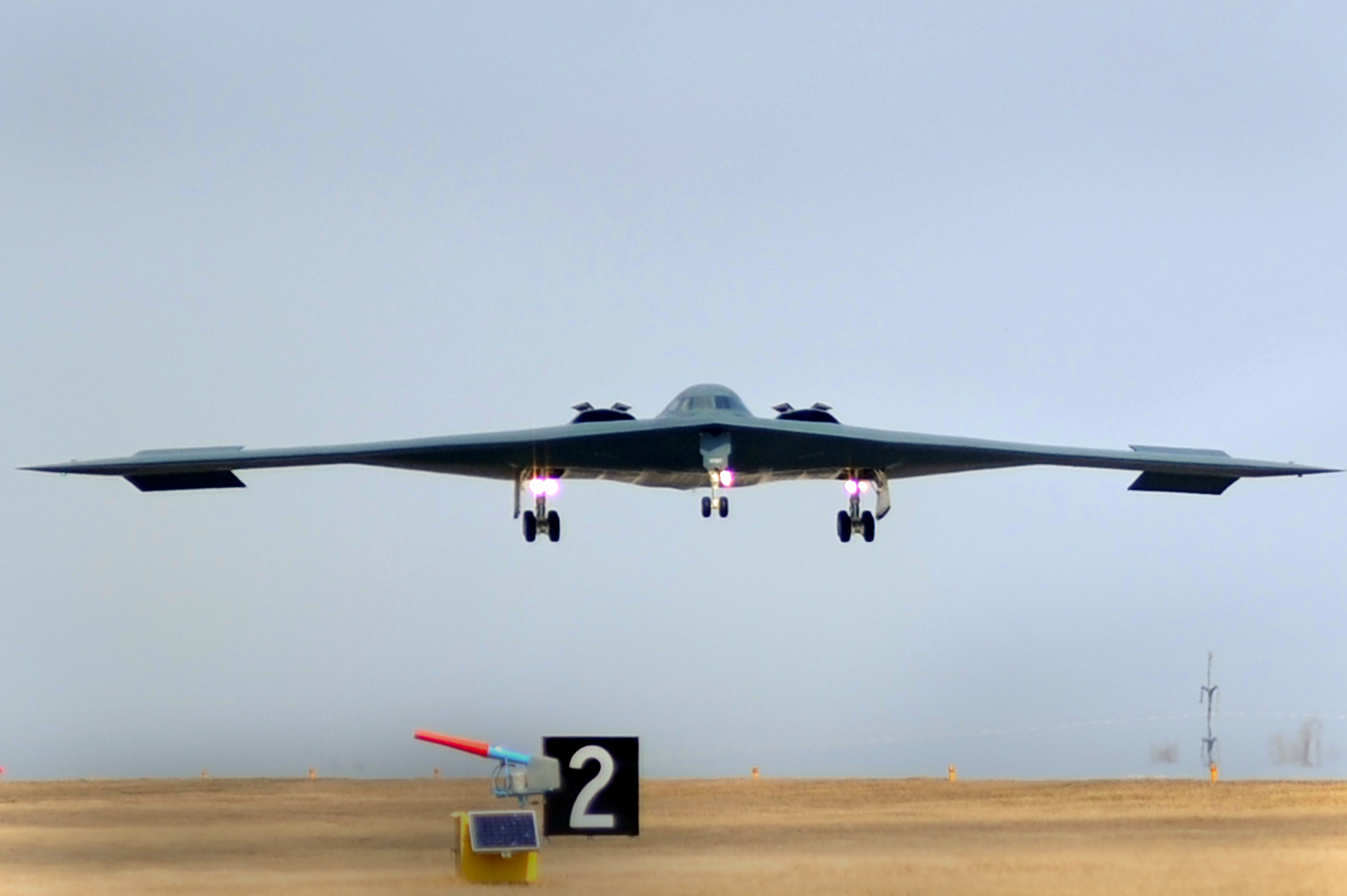
An American B-2 Spirit bomber lands at Whiteman Air Force Base after a bombing mission over Libya

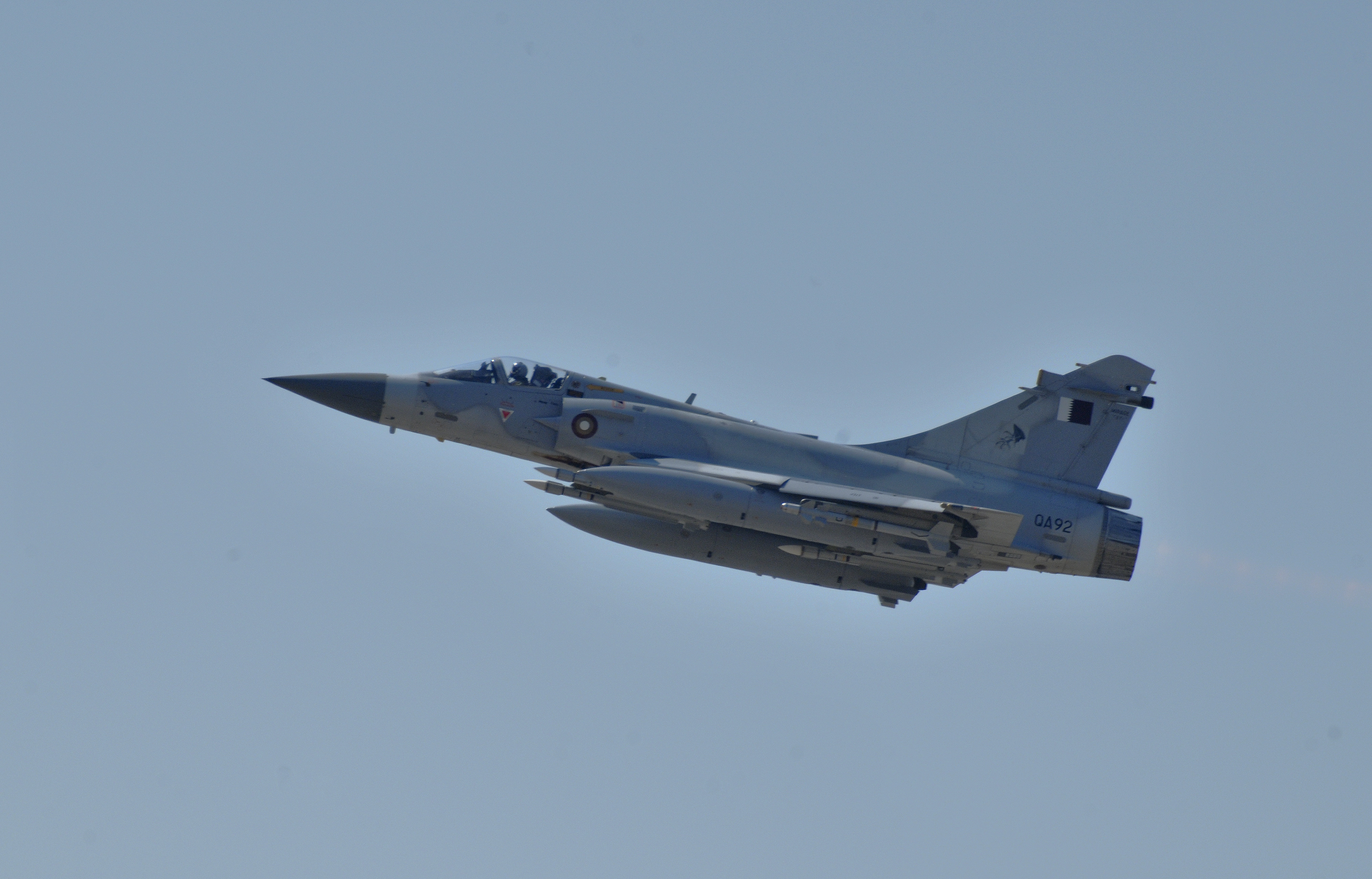
A Qatar Emiri Air Force Dassault Mirage 2000-5 participating in operations over Libya

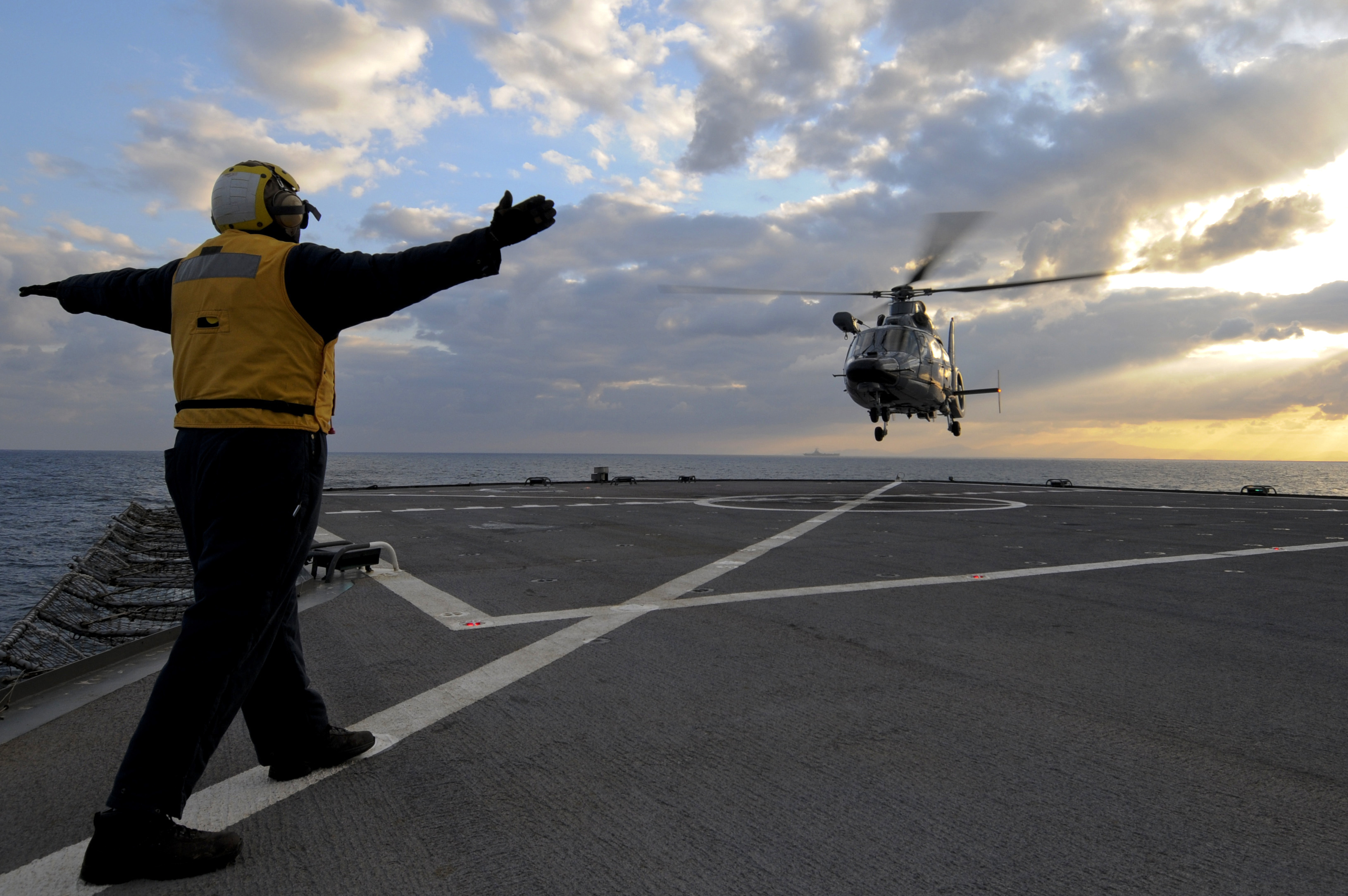
A French Navy rescue helicopter, from the French aircraft carrier Charles de Gaulle, lands aboard the American command ship USS Mount Whitney

On 19 March, nineteen French Air Force aircraft entered Libyan airspace to begin reconnaissance missions as part of Opération Harmattan, and flew over Benghazi to prevent attacks on the rebel-controlled city. Italian Air Force planes reportedly also began surveillance operations over Libya. In the evening, a French jet destroyed a government vehicle. Shortly afterward, a French airstrike destroyed four tanks southwest of Benghazi. US and British ships and submarines fired at least 114 Tomahawk cruise missiles at twenty Libyan integrated air and ground defense systems. Three US B-2 Spirit stealth bombers flew non-stop from the US to drop forty bombs on a major Libyan airfield, while other US aircraft searched for Libyan ground forces to attack. Twenty-five coalition naval vessels, including three US submarines, began operating in the area. NATO ships and aircraft began enforcing a blockade of Libya, patrolling the approaches to Libyan territorial waters.

Libyan State TV reported that government forces had shot down a French warplane over Tripoli on 19 March, a claim denied by France.

On 20 March, several Storm Shadow missiles were launched against Libyan targets by British jets. Nineteen U.S. jets also conducted strikes against Libyan government forces. A loyalist convoy south of Benghazi was targeted. At least seventy vehicles were destroyed, and loyalist ground troops sustained multiple casualties. Strikes also took place on the Bab al-Azizia compound in Tripoli from late 20 March to early 21 March. Apart from loyalist troops, no other person was present there.

By 21 March, the Libyan government's SA-2, SA-3, and SA-5 air defense systems had been completely neutralized, while further strikes took place on targets Tripoli, and according to the Libyan government, in Sabha and Sirte.

On 22 March, Coalition strikes continued, and a Libyan aircraft flying towards Benghazi was attacked. An American F-15E Strike Eagle fighter jet on a bombing mission crashed after experiencing equipment failure. The pilot and weapons officer ejected and were recovered by a US rescue team inserted by helicopter.

By 23 March, the Libyan Air Force had been largely destroyed, with most of its aircraft destroyed or rendered inoperable. The Libyan government's integrated air defense system was also degraded to a point where Coalition aircraft could operate over Libya with almost total impunity. On that same day, Coalition aircraft flew at least two sorties against government forces in Misrata. Later in the day, it was announced that all government forces and equipment, with the exception of individual snipers, had retreated from the city or were destroyed. In the early morning hours, four Canadian CF-18 jets supported by two CC-150 Polaris tankers bombed a government ammunition depot in Misrata, marking the first time Canadian jets bombed Libya since the campaign began.

On 24 March, a loyalist Soko G-2 Galeb that violated the no-fly zone was shot down by a French Dassault Rafale as it attempted to land near Misrata. Another five Galebs in the area were destroyed on the ground by a French airstrike the following day. The same day, a British submarine fired multiple Tomahawk Land Attack cruise missiles at Libyan air defenses.

On 25 March, NATO announced that it would be taking over the command of the no-fly-zone operations, after several days of heated debate over who should control operations in Libya. The US had continuously reiterated that it wished to hand over command to an international organization. Airstrikes continued during the day. Two Royal Norwegian Air Force F-16s destroyed a number of Libyan government tanks. French Air Force jets destroyed a government artillery battery outside Ajdabiya, and British and French jets carried out a joint mission outside Ajdabiya, destroying seven government tanks. On that day, the Libyan Health Ministry reported that 114 people had been killed and 445 wounded since the bombing campaign started. However, a Vatican official in Tripoli reported on 31 March that Coalition airstrikes had killed at least 40 civilians in Tripoli.

On 26 March, Norwegian F-16s bombed an airfield in Libya during the night. Canadian CF-18s bombed government electronic warfare sites near Misrata. French aircraft destroyed at least seven loyalist aircraft, including two military helicopters. British jets destroyed five armored vehicles with Brimstone missiles, and Royal Danish Air Force F-16s destroyed numerous loyalist self-propelled rocket launchers and tanks.

On 27 March, Danish aircraft destroyed government artillery south of Tripoli, while Canadian jets destroyed ammunition bunkers south of Misrata. French jets knocked out a command center south of Tripoli, and conducted joint patrols with Qatari aircraft.

On 28 March, Coalition forces fought their first naval engagement when USS Barry, supported by a P-3 Orion patrol aircraft and A-10 Thunderbolt attack aircraft, engaged the Libyan Coast Guard vessel Vittoria and two smaller craft, after the vessels began firing indiscriminately at merchant vessels in the port of Misrata.Vittoria was disabled and forced to beach, another vessel was sunk, and the third abandoned. The same day, British jets destroyed two tanks and two armored vehicles near Misrata, and ammunition bunkers in the Sabha area.

On 29 March, U.S. aircraft fired on another Libyan Coast Guard vessel after it opened fire on merchant ships in the port of Misrata, forcing it to limp to shore. Coalition airstrikes continued to hit loyalist ground forces and military targets throughout Libya, with U.S. aircraft employing tankbuster missiles. The following day, French and British jets conducted strikes on loyalist armor and air defenses.

On 31 March, NATO took command of Coalition air operations in Libya. Subsequent operations were carried out as part of Operation Unified Protector. Daily Coalition strikes continued to target Libyan government ground forces, air defenses, artillery, rocket launchers, command-and-control centers, radars, military bases, bunkers, ammunition storage sites, logistical targets, and missile storage sites. These strikes took place all over the country, many of them in Tripoli, where the Bab al-Azizia compound was also targeted. The strikes caused numerous material losses and casualties among government forces.

On 6 April, an attack against the Sarir oil field killed three guards, injured other employees and caused damage to a pipeline connecting the field to a Mediterranean port. The Libyan government claimed that NATO aircraft carried out the attack. Both the rebels and the information manager at the Arabian Gulf Oil Company denied the Libyan government's claims, and attributed the attack to loyalist forces.

On 23 April, the US carried out its first UAV strike, when two RQ-1 Predator drones destroyed a multiple rocket launcher near Misrata.

On 4 May, NATO Secretary-General Anders Fogh Rasmussen claimed that the Libyan government's military capabilities had been significantly degraded since the operation started, stating that "every week, every day we make new progress, hit important targets. But I'm not able to quantify the degree to which we have degraded Muammar Gaddafi's military capabilities, but definitely it is much weaker now than when our operation started". On 5 April, NATO claimed that nearly a third of the Libyan government's military capabilities had been destroyed.

NATO claimed that it was enforcing the no-fly zone on rebels as well as on government forces. However, an unidentified rebel pilot and an air traffic controller claimed that NATO agreed to let them attack government targets after approving a request by the rebel military council. On 8 May, NATO claimed to have carried out its first interception when it escorted a Free Libyan Air Force MiG-23 back to base, while the unidentified pilot claimed that he had been allowed to take off and destroyed a fuel truck and two other vehicles.

==== Aid to rebels ====
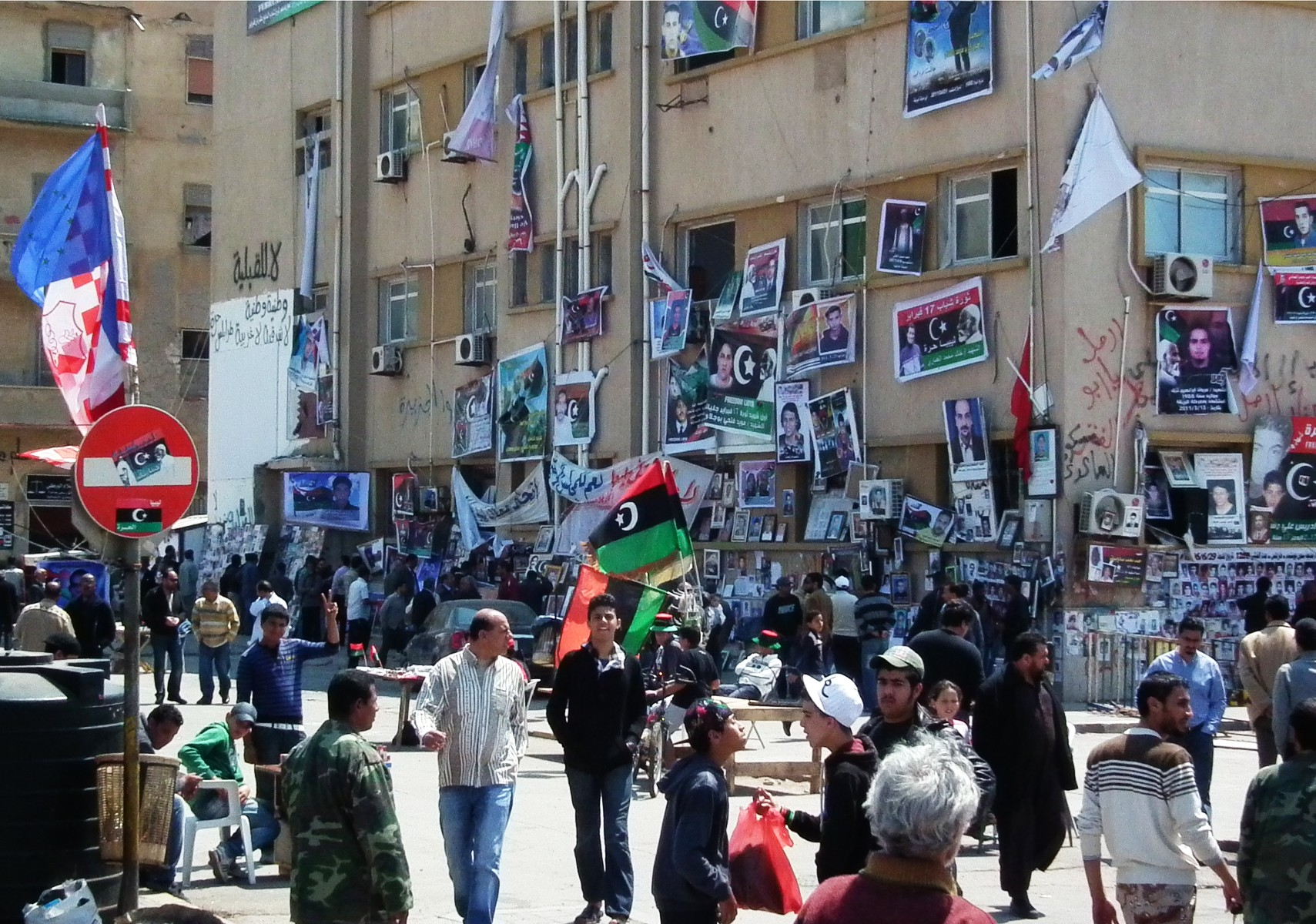
Court square in Benghazi, April 2011. At the central place for gatherings and demonstrations the walls are draped with pictures of casualties, mourners passing by.

On 19 April, the UK announced that it was sending military advisers to Libya to help the rebels improve their organization and communications, but not to train or arm them. The British government also supplied the rebels with telecommunications equipment and body armor.

On 20 April, the US announced a $25 million (€20 million) aid package to the Libyan rebels, which consisted of fuel trucks and fuel containers, ambulances, medical equipment, protective vests, binoculars, food, and non-secure radios. The first aid shipment arrived in Benghazi on 10 May. In addition, Italy and France were reported to be sending military advisors to aid Libyan rebels.

Qatar supplied MILAN anti-tank missiles, pickup trucks, and uniforms to the rebels. The Libyan government claimed that Qatar also sent 20 military trainers to Benghazi to train over 700 rebel fighters. In addition, Qatar assisted a rebel satellite television operation in broadcasting from Doha. On 27 March, Qatar and the Libyan opposition signed an oil export deal, which would see the National Transitional Council exporting oil to Qatar from rebel-held areas in exchange for money to finance the rebel cause. Qatar also supplied petroleum products to the rebels.

On 9 June, Turkey donated $100 million to the National Transitional Council for humanitarian assistance.

On 19 June, rebel oil chief Ali Tarhouni said that rebels were running out of money and blamed Western countries for not living up to their promises of financial aids.

On 29 June, France acknowledged that it had airdropped arms supplies to rebels in the Nafusa Mountains in early June. The French military claimed to have supplied only light arms and ammunition to help Libyan civilians defend themselves from attacks by government forces. However, a report in Le Figaro claimed that rocket launchers and anti-tank missiles were among the weapons dropped. Meanwhile, the British government offered the rebels 5,000 sets of body armor, 6,650 uniforms, 5,000 high-visibility vests, and communications equipment for the National Transitional Council's police force.

=== Naval blockade ===
On 23 March, NATO began enforcing a naval blockade of Libya, with warships and aircraft patrolling the approaches to Libyan territorial waters. The ships and aircraft conducted their operations in international waters, and did not enter Libya's territorial waters. Ships used surveillance to verify the actions of shipping in the region. NATO forces worked to interdict ships and aircraft carrying weapons or mercenaries, while working with the International Maritime Organization to ensure that legitimate private and commercial shipping to Libya continued.

=== Second opposition advance ===
On March 20, as airstrikes were being carried out on loyalist armored and supply columns, rebel forces began a renewed offensive from Benghazi towards Tripoli. They advanced 240 kilometres (150 mi) along the coast of the Gulf of Sidra. The first objective was Ajdabiya, which the rebels reached on 21 March after taking Zuteinia along the way. Rebel forces attempted to attack Ajdabiya and relieve rebels inside the city, but were repulsed by government troops using tanks and multiple rocket launchers, and retreated to a checkpoint 19 kilometres (12 mi) from the city. That night, US airstrikes hit loyalist positions reportedly shelling the city. On 22 March, loyalist shelling of rebel positions and Coalition airstrikes against loyalist forces continued. Hussein El Warfali, the commander of a Libyan Army Brigade stationed near Tripoli, was reportedly killed during the strikes. Rebel in Ajdabiya claimed that three government tanks were destroyed. On 24 March, government troops still held the main east and west gate areas and most of the city, except the city center, and managed to hold off advancing rebels with the help of mortar and artillery fire. Some rebel reinforcements managed to slip inside the city, and the situation became fluid, with large parts of Ajdabiya changing sides. During the night, British jets attacked government armor. By the following day, Gaddafi forces controlled the western and central parts of the city, while rebels controlled the eastern part. During the afternoon, four rebel multiple rocket launchers shelled loyalist positions as part of a counteroffensive, and government artillery returned fire. The rebel attack was halted after loyalist armored units repelled an advance by rebel forward units. During the night, some rebel reinforcements managed to slip into Ajdabiya, and battled dug-in government troops throughout the night, hitting their positions with RPGs and rockets, while NATO aircraft attacked loyalist tanks and armored vehicles, artillery, rocket launchers, and a military barracks. On 26 March, the rebels were in full control after loyalist forces withdrew from the city. During their retreat, government forces left behind large amounts of weapons and munitions, as well as intact armor and artillery. Loyalist forces also left their dead behind. Rebels seized military equipment abandoned by loyalist forces.

Rebels subsequently took Brega, Ra's Lanuf, and Bin Jawad with Coalition air support. According to a doctor in Ra's Lanuf who treated government casualties from Ajdabiya and the road from Benghazi, the airstrikes caused hundreds of casualties among government forces, morale dropped, and soldiers were faking injuries to escape the fighting. According to the doctor, "the first day, we had 56 seriously wounded. To the head, to the brain, lost arms and legs. Soldiers with a lot of shrapnel in them. It was like that every day after". The doctor said that he did not know how many soldiers were killed, but that soldiers who came to the hospital said that there were 150 dead on the first day of airstrikes, and that there were less after that, as they hid.

Throughout the offensive, fighting also took place in Misrata. Despite continuous strikes on loyalist vehicles by aircraft and Tomahawk cruise missiles, Gaddafi forces regained control of much of the city, using tanks, artillery, mortars, and snipers. The attacks caused civilian casualties, including among children, and a hospital being used by rebels to treat their injured was overrun and used as a sniper position. Regime warships took the city's port. A non-violent demonstration by unarmed rebel supporters was broken up by snipers, artillery, and tanks. On 28 March, heavy fighting took place near Sirte, where government troops managed to halt the rebel advance. One captured rebel was subsequently executed. Meanwhile, government troops again bombarded Misrata, and managed to capture more of the city. Although NATO airstrikes continued to target loyalist vehicles, Gaddafi forces adapted to airstrikes by replacing armor with civilian vehicles fitted with weapons. Government forces launched a counteroffensive on 29 March, forcing the rebels into a retreat from Bin Jawad toward Ra's Lanuf. The same day, loyalist forces led by the Khamis Brigade captured the western and northwestern parts of Misrata. According to witnesses and rebels, civilians were forced from their homes and killed indiscriminately. During the night, heavy fighting occurred in the Az-Zawaabi district, in which nine rebels were killed and five wounded. On 30 March, the rebels said that they were pulling out of Ra's Lanuf due to heavy tank and artillery fire from loyalist forces. Following a government counter-offensive, Gaddafi forces took control of Brega. Clashes continued between rebel and government troops in the area between Brega and Ajdabiya.

=== Stalemate in the east, rebel progress in the west ===
Rebels attempted a counter-attack to retake Brega. For eight days, loyalists and rebels battled for Brega. In the end, Gaddafi's forces repelled numerous rebel attacks on the city and managed to force the rebels out of Brega by 7 April, despite continued NATO strikes. During the battles, a NATO airstrike accidentally hit rebel forces, destroying 3 tanks, damaging 5, and killing 27 rebels. NATO claimed that it did not know the rebels were using tanks. During the battle, 46–49 rebels and 28 loyalists were killed. Rebel forces retreated, fleeing in several different directions. The rebels regrouped in Ajdabiya. Following the rebel retreat, government troops consolidated their control over Brega and prepared to advance on Ajdabiya. On 9 April, rebel forces attacked Brega, but only managed to reach the university before being forced back by intense shelling by Gaddafi's forces. The Libyan government claimed that its forces had shot down two rebel helicopters near the eastern oil facilities in Brega. The rebels confirmed that they had sent two helicopters into combat, and journalists claimed to have seen at least one helicopter apparently fighting for the rebels in action.

Following the failed attack on Brega, Gaddafi's forces shelled Ajdabiya and invaded the city from the north, west and south and managed to reach the heart of the town by the following afternoon. They were later forced back by a rebel counterattack that came after rebel reinforcements arrived. Gaddafi's forces managed to retain control of the western part of the city. During the night, street battles took place along the city's main street, and in the southern part of Ajdabiya. On 10 April, Gaddafi's forces managed to push closer the city center, although they continued to be hit by NATO air attacks. The following day, rebels managed to completely push Gaddafi's forces out of the city, but fighting continued west of Ajdabiya. The front line then stagnated outside of the city, 40 km (25 mi) down the road to Brega. There were exchanges of artillery and mortar fire throughout the following days. On 15 April, a rebel column tried to advance on Brega from Ajdabiya following a rocket barrage, but were stopped when Gaddafi forces carried out a hit-and-run attack 1 kilometre (0.62 mi) outside Brega, killing one rebel and wounding two.

Street battles broke out in Misrata in mid-April with Gaddafi's forces repeatedly shelling the city. Rebels claimed that Gaddafi's forces were using cluster bombs in their attacks. Human Rights Watch confirmed that cluster munitions were used, claiming that its researchers inspected remnants and interviewed witnesses. The Libyan government denied that it was employing cluster bombs. Migrant workers trapped in Misrata began protesting their conditions, demanding repatriation from the city, which led to several cases of rebels opening fire on them, causing deaths. By 22 April, rebels managed to drive Gaddafi's forces from several locations near the city center with NATO air support. The Deputy Foreign Minister of Libya subsequently pledged that the Libyan Army would withdraw from Misrata. On 23 April, Gaddafi's forces withdrew from Misrata, but continued to shell the city. On 26 April, a Gaddafi force attempted to retake Misrata, but was stopped by a NATO airstrike.

Gaddafi's troops launched an artillery bombardment against rebel-held areas in the Jabal al Gharbi district in the Nafusa Mountains, leaving 110 rebels and civilians dead.

On 21 April, a convoy of nine loyalist vehicles attacked the rebel-held al-Boster oil facility in the eastern Libyan desert, southwest of Tobruk, deep inside rebel-held territory. Eight of the nine rebels stationed there were killed, while the remaining rebel escaped wounded. The facility was damaged during the attack. Loyalists set a tire on fire to burn the remains of a senior rebel guard. Rebel spokesman Ahmed Bani said that the attack was carried out to disrupt oil sales by rebels.

On 24 April, Gaddafi's forces shelled the border crossing at Wazzin, and fired Grad rockets into Zintan, causing casualties. The following day, 2 rebels were killed and three wounded in fighting near Nalut. The rebels claimed to have killed 45 Gaddafi troops and captured 17.

Rebel forces captured Wazzin after overcoming fierce resistance from government troops. Gaddafi's forces became trapped between the town and the border with Tunisia and as a result 105 soldiers crossed the border and surrendered to Tunisian officials. On 28 April, Gaddafi's forces recaptured the Wazzin border crossing with Tunisia after a swift advance during which they pushed the rebels into Tunisia. Fighting continued on the edge of the Tunisian border town of Dehiba, which included a failed rebel counterattack. On 28 April, loyalist forces captured Al Jawf with minimal resistance, and the rebels quickly retreated. Three people were reportedly killed during the assault. On 29 April, elements of the Tunisian army and border police clashed with loyalist forces.

On 30 April, a NATO airstrike hit the home of Saif al-Arab Gaddafi, Gaddafi's youngest son. Libyan officials reported that Saif and three of Muammar Gaddafi's grandchildren were killed in the strike. The government also claimed Gaddafi was there, but "escaped". On 26 April, British Defence Minister Liam Fox and US Defense Secretary Robert Gates, had told reporters at the Pentagon that NATO planes were not targeting Gaddafi specifically but would continue to attack his command centers. Within the United Nations Security Council, Russia and China voiced concerns that NATO has gone beyond the UN resolution's authorisation to take "all necessary measures" to protect civilians. Russia expressed "increasing concern" regarding reports of civilian casualties, and doubted claims that the attacks did not deliberately target Gaddafi and his family. Following the attacks, angry mobs of Gaddafi loyalists burned and vandalized the British and Italian embassies, a US consulate, and a UN office, prompting the UN to pull its staff out of Tripoli.

The strike came shortly after Gaddafi called for a mutual cease-fire and negotiations with NATO. A NATO official said before Saturday's strike that the alliance would keep up pressure until the U.N. Security Council mandate on Libya was fulfilled. The NATO official noted that Gaddafi's forces had attacked Misrata hours before his speech. Opposition leaders called the cease-fire offers publicity stunts. "We don't believe that there is a solution that includes him or any member of his family. So it is well past any discussions. The only solution is for him to depart," said rebel spokesperson Jalal al-Galal.

On the same day of the attack, government troops entered Jalu and engaged in a battle with rebels, in which five rebels, five civilians, and three soldiers were killed.

Following the strike, loyalist forces stepped up their artillery attacks on Misrata, and continued to shell Wazzin. Government troops in Misrata were reported to be seen wearing gas masks, sparking fears that Gaddafi would use chemical weapons to retaliate for his son's death.

On 1 May, NATO carried out 60 airstrikes throughout Libya, targeting ammunition storage sites, military vehicles, a communications facility, and an anti-aircraft gun. Rebels claimed that a NATO airstrike destroyed 45 military vehicles in an attack on a loyalist convoy leaving Jalu. The following day, government tanks tried to enter the city from the al-Ghiran suburb. Six people were killed and several dozen wounded. Misrata was still subjected to continuous rocket fire from government forces, with a spokesperson claiming that the shelling had not stopped for 36 hours. Government forces halted their shelling of Misrata at about midday following NATO strikes, but the port remained closed, having been bombarded earlier in the day. Meanwhile, two of the three mines that were laid by loyalist forces in the port of Misrata that were preventing aid from being shipped in were destroyed, with NATO minesweepers searching for the third.

On 3 May, loyalist forces started shelling Misrata. The attack stopped briefly when a NATO plane flew overhead, but resumed shortly afterward. NATO aircraft conducted 62 airstrikes against loyalist targets near Misrata, Ra's Lanuf, Sirte, Brega, and Zintan.

On 4 May, a ship chartered to deliver humanitarian aid and evacuate migrant workers, journalists, and wounded Libyans was able to dock in the port of Misrata after being guided in by tugboat to avoid hitting a mine. Gaddafi forces shelled the area, hitting a camp for stranded migrant workers and causing deaths and injuries. Loyalists also stepped up their attacks in the Nafusa Mountains, shelling two towns and a key supply route.

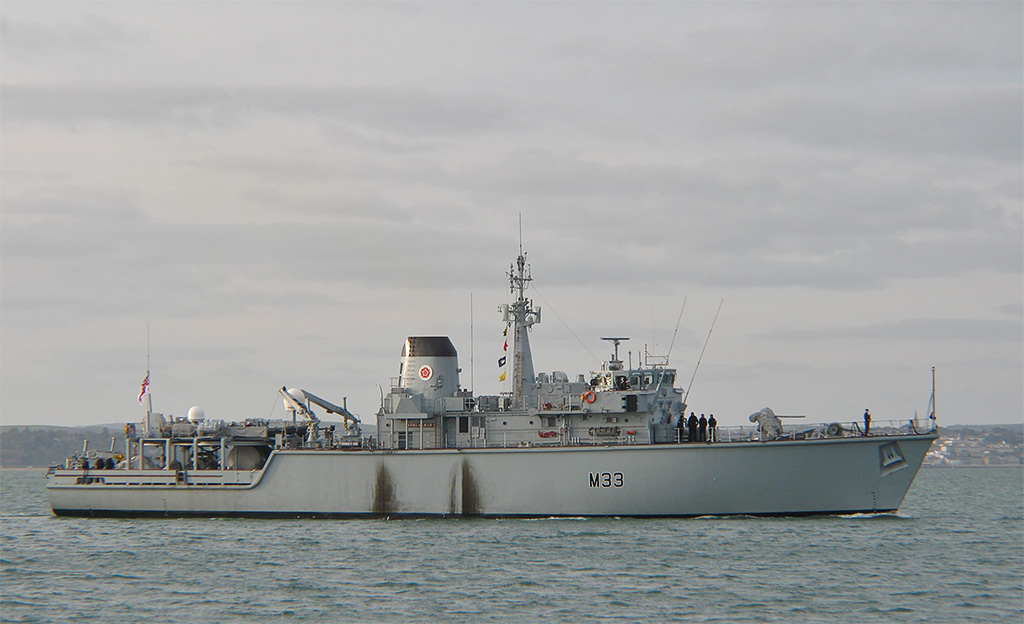
HMS Brocklesby, the Hunt-class minehunter of the Royal Navy that destroyed a pro-Gaddafi sea mine outside the port of Misrata

On 5 May, the Royal Navy mine clearance vessel HMS Brocklesby located and destroyed the final mine at the entrance to the port of Misrata. NATO aircraft conducted numerous airstrikes against loyalist forces near Misrata and Ajdabiya, and military targets in Tripoli.

On 6 May, NATO conducted 57 airstrikes against loyalist military targets throughout Libya, while opposition forces gained full control of Kufra and Abu Rawaya after Gaddafi forces stationed there surrendered. Loyalists attacked the town of Jalu, but were repulsed by rebel resistance and a Coalition airstrike. Loyalist soldiers launched an attack on a rebel checkpoint between Jalu and Al Jawf, killing six rebels. A rebel scouting pickup truck was also hit by loyalist artillery during fighting alon the Brega-Ajdabiya road, killing another three rebels.

On 7 May, Gaddafi forces continued shelling the port of Misrata, hitting a large fuel tank. Government forces also used small crop-dusters to bomb four fuel tanks. The attacks started a fire, which spread to four more fuel tanks. Loyalist artillery and mortar fire also hit Tunisia after renewed clashes broke out at the Wazzin border crossing. Clashes also took place in Zintan and Yefren, and in the area between. The area between Zintan and Yefren was being secured, but Yefren was still under siege. Rebel casualties were 11 killed and at least 50 wounded. Loyalists also conducted hit-and-run attacks against Jalu and Ojla. The rebels also claimed to have retaken Al Jawf, but government troops were still in the surrounding area.

On 8 May, heavy fighting took place near Misrata Airport, and the city came under renewed attack by Gaddafi forces. Meanwhile, NATO strikes hit numerous government targets in the vicinity of Misrata, Zintan, Ajdabiya, Houn, and Brega.

On 9 May, the shelling of Misrata by Gaddafi forces continued to choke off humanitarian supplies to the city, while fighting continued near Misrata Airport. Meanwhile, Coalition strikes hit two targets in Tripoli. Fighting also took place along the Brega-Ajdabiya road. The rebels claimed to have killed 36 loyalist soldiers and lost 6 fighters.

On 10 May, rebels from Misrata and Zlitan joined up and engaged in close combat that rendered loyalist long-range rockets useless. The rebels managed to drive loyalist forces on the west side of Misrata out of rocket range, and to push loyalist troops from Misrata Airport, burning their tanks as they retreated. Rebels also claimed to have made gains near Jalu, and the area between Ajdabiya and Brega in fierce fighting. The same day, a NATO strike hit a government command center in Tripoli. Rebels subsequently began an advance towards Zliten.

=== Intensification of NATO attacks ===
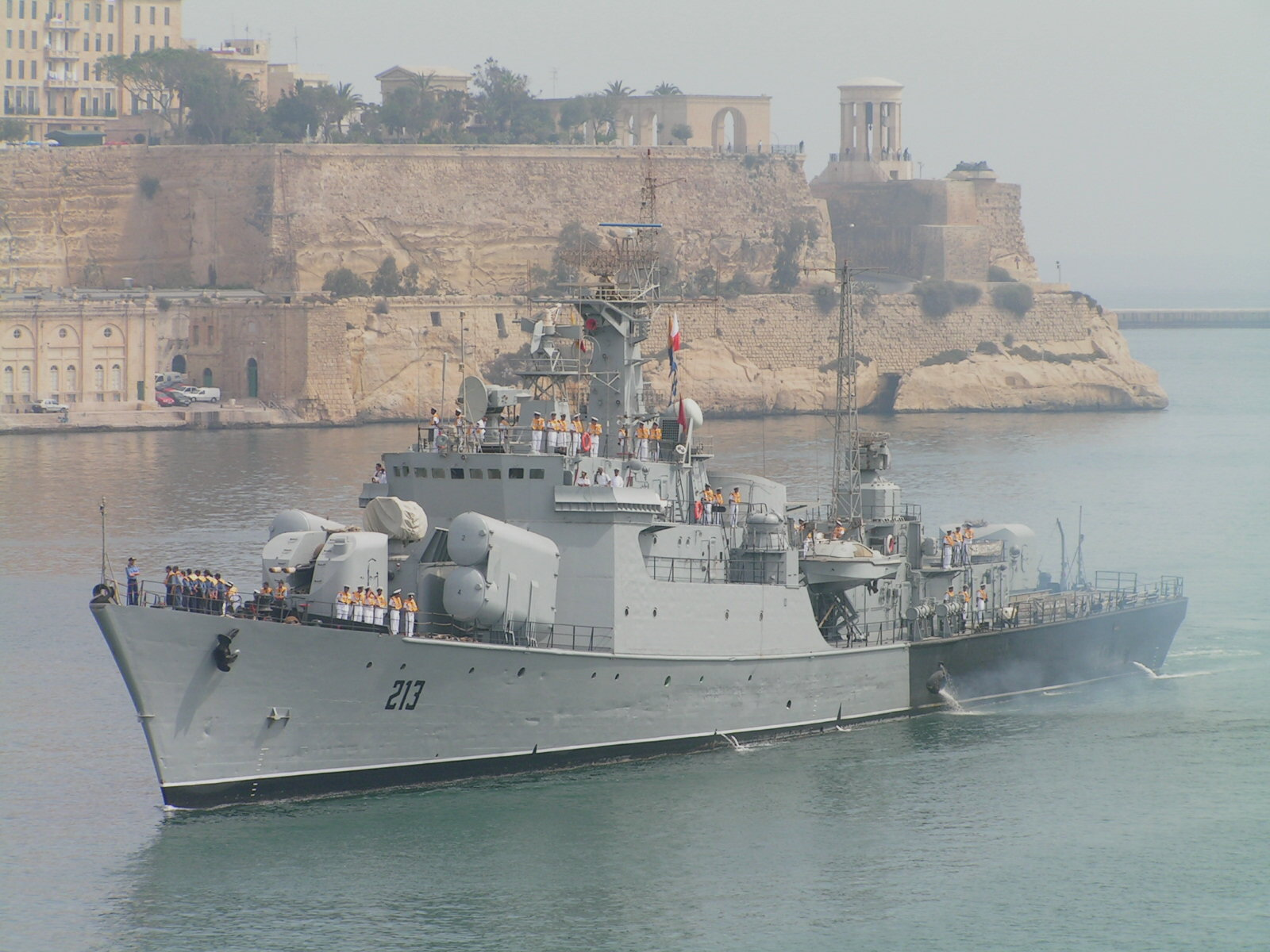
The Libyan frigate Al Ghardabia, which was among the warships hit by RAF jets on 19 May.

On 11 May, NATO aircraft fired four rockets at Gaddafi's compound in Tripoli, killing at least two people. Strikes also hit government military targets throughout the country.

On 12 May, NATO carried out 52 strikes against loyalist targets. Loyalist forces fired at least three rockets into Ajdabiya. Loyalist forces also launched an attack on Misrata port, using a number of small boats, but were forced to abandon their attack after NATO warships intervened. Regime forces onshore covered their retreat with artillery and anti-aircraft fire directed at the warships. The warships HMCS Charlottetown and HMS Liverpool responded with machine gun fire.

On 13 May, NATO carried out 44 airstrikes. According to the Libyan government, a strike in the vicinity of Brega killed 11 Islamic clerics and wounded 45 civilians. In Tripoli, shortages of food and fuel were worsening, along with increasing NATO attacks. According to an activist, a wave of anti-government protests took place in several Tripoli neighborhoods throughout the week. Italian Foreign Minister Franco Frattini said that Gaddafi was probably wounded in a NATO airstrike, and had left Tripoli. The Libyan government dismissed the claim as "nonsense", and state television broadcast a brief audio recording of what it said was Gaddafi, taunting NATO as a cowardly crusader, and claiming to be in a place where NATO could not reach him.

On 15 May, NATO conducted 48 airstrikes against loyalist targets. British jets and missiles hit two intelligence facilities. NATO also hacked into Libyan Army frequencies, and broadcast claims of atrocities and appeals to stop fighting, telling them to either "build a peaceful Libya for the benefit of your family and a better future for your country" or face continued airstrikes.

On 16 May, NATO conducted 46 airstrikes on loyalist targets. Among the targets hit was a training base used by the bodyguards of members of Gaddafi's inner circle, which was hit by British jets. At least four Grad rockets fired from Libya landed in Tunisian territory. Libyan government forces used two rigid-hull inflatable boats laden with explosives in an attempt to hinder aid shipments to the port of Misrata, but the vessels were intercepted by NATO warships and helicopters. One boat escaped at high speed, but the second was captured, and destroyed by a NATO warship using small-arms fire. The following day, NATO carried out 53 strikes.

Throughout the following days, NATO continued to carry out dozens of airstrikes on government military capabilities, a large percentage of the targets being in Tripoli. Meanwhile, government forces continued artillery attacks on rebel areas. On 19 May, British jets carried out a massive strike against the Libyan Navy, hitting naval facilities in the harbors Tripoli, Khoms, and Sirte. Eight warships were sunk or severely damaged. A dockyard for launching rigid-hull inflatable speedboats was also hit, and the attacks caused damage to naval infrastructure. The same day, increased rebel activity was reported between Brega and Ajdabiya, with new recruits and ammunition arriving in large numbers at the front lines. Meanwhile, loyalist forces again started shelling Misrata, killing one rebel and wounding ten. The next day, another sixty strikes were carried out. In Brega, a relatively small rebel unit with artillery support launched an attack against Gaddafi troops at Brega University, an area in which rebels had trouble engaging in before due to the extensive use of artillery by loyalists. The university was attacked from multiple angles, but government troops managed to retain their positions at the university by the end of the day.

On 21 May, NATO naval forces intercepted a fuel tanker destined for Libya, carrying fuel alleged to be for government use. In addition, the harbor of Tripoli was again one of the targets bombed in NATO attacks. Also on the same day a ship loaded with food and medical supplies docked in Misrata and unloaded its cargo, while two ships loaded with humanitarian aid departed from Benghazi and docked in Zarzis, Tunisia, where their aid was unloaded to be taken by truck to the Nafusa Mountains region. A French military spokesman announced that the French Navy amphibious assault ship Le Tonnerre had departed Toulon the previous week, and was sailing towards the Libyan coast with a load of twelve Gazelle and Tiger helicopters. Later, the British military said that it was also deploying four Apache helicopters. Meanwhile, clashes took place in Nalut, in which one rebel and ten government soldiers were killed. Rebels also attacked New Brega from six directions to outflank loyalists entrenched there. Two rebels were killed and twelve wounded, along with an unknown number of loyalists. Two loyalist vehicles mounted with heavy weapons were destroyed and another three captured. Loyalist forces counterattacked later during the evening. One rebel was killed and four wounded during fighting at the Arbaein checkpoint between Brega and Ajdabiya.

On 25 May, rebels carried out an attack against government forces near Kufra, destroying a weapons-laden vehicle. The same day, rebels clashed with Sudanese mercenaries near the Sudanese border.

On 26 May, NATO warplanes bombed more than twenty targets in Tripoli. All of the strikes were conducted within less than half an hour. It was widely described as the heaviest attack on the city since the campaign began. According to Libyan government spokesman Moussa Ibrahim, the strikes targeted buildings used by volunteer units of the Libyan Army. NATO claimed that a vehicle storage facility near the Bab al-Azizia compound was hit. At least three people were killed and dozens injured. NATO strikes continued to target Gaddafi's forces with an increasing frequency, attacking dozens of targets all around the country daily, many of them in Tripoli. The Bab al-Azizia compound continued to be targeted. Gaddafi forces continued their artillery and rocket attacks, and laid a minefield in the Misrata area. Water continued to be cut off in Misrata, and loyalists also re-routed sewage to flow directly into wells.

On 27 May, they attempted to advance on Misrata, but the rebels drove them back, losing 5 dead and 8–9 wounded. Clashes took place in Bani Walid, and a high-ranking loyalist officer was reportedly killed. Clashes also reportedly took place between security forces and protesters in four areas of Tripoli.

On 29 May 120 government soldiers and eight officers defected from the government and left Libya. The eight officers included five generals, two colonels, and a major. One of the defectors, General Melud Massoud Halasa, said that Gaddafi's forces were weakening daily, and were only twenty percent as effective as they were before the war began. Halasa estimated that only ten generals remained loyal to Gaddafi. On the same day, an anti-government protest broke out in Tripoli, when about 1,000 people gathered for the funeral of two opposition members killed in a clash with security forces. The demonstration was broken up by loyalist militia, who used live ammunition to disperse it, killing two people. The protest was the largest that took place in Tripoli in nearly three months.

=== Gaddafi operations in rebel areas ===
Following the withdrawal of government forces from cities as they fell, members of Gaddafi's Revolutionary Committees remained, and launched a series of shootings and bombings against civilians and spied on local rebel activity. They also assassinated a military commander who defected to the rebels and a journalist, both of them in Benghazi. On 1 June, suspected Gaddafi loyalists blew up a car in front of a Benghazi hotel where foreign journalists and diplomats were staying. Rebels claimed that pro-Gaddafi agents in Benghazi may be acting as spies for the regime, seeking to corrode the uprising on the inside. According to a Benghazi resident, Gaddafi's supporters were in hiding, organizing themselves for when the government retook Benghazi. Estimates of the number of Gaddafi sympathizers in Benghazi ranged from 300 to 6,000. Rebel Information Minister Mahmud Shammam told journalists that small sleeper cells of Gaddafi's agents existed.

Rebel forces responded with a security crackdown, arresting hundreds of suspects over a several-week period. Many arrests were carried out by civilian "protection squads" not sanctioned by the National Transitional Council. Some of the suspects targeted by the rebels were armed and engaged in shootouts, resulting in casualties on both sides. Rebels often arrested suspects based on criteria such as the regime loyalty of their hometown, a photograph of Gaddafi in their wallet, and family ties. However, the rebels also used other methods to discover Gaddafi supporters, such as sending women into the homes of suspects to pretend to be in need of something while searching for guns. Some suspects were arrested after their friends reported that they were loyal to Gaddafi. One detainee died of torture while in custody. Some suspects were summarily executed rather than being arrested. An official in the rebel security agency stated that six of Gaddafi's former internal security agents were found dead in one week. He claimed that they had been on a closely guarded list of suspects, but that each time that an arrest was ordered, it was discovered that they had already been killed. Rebel death squads were suspected to be behind the killings.

The Al-Nidaa Brigade was a rebel military brigade loyal to the Gaddafi government, and operated as a "fifth column" within rebel forces. Their activities included attacking two Benghazi jails, freeing more than 200 inmates. In late July, opposition forces attacked the brigade's base near Benghazi, and overran the base after several hours. The rebels lost four dead and six injured, while the Al-Nidaa Brigade suffered about twenty casualties, with another 31 fighters arrested.

=== June helicopter strikes ===
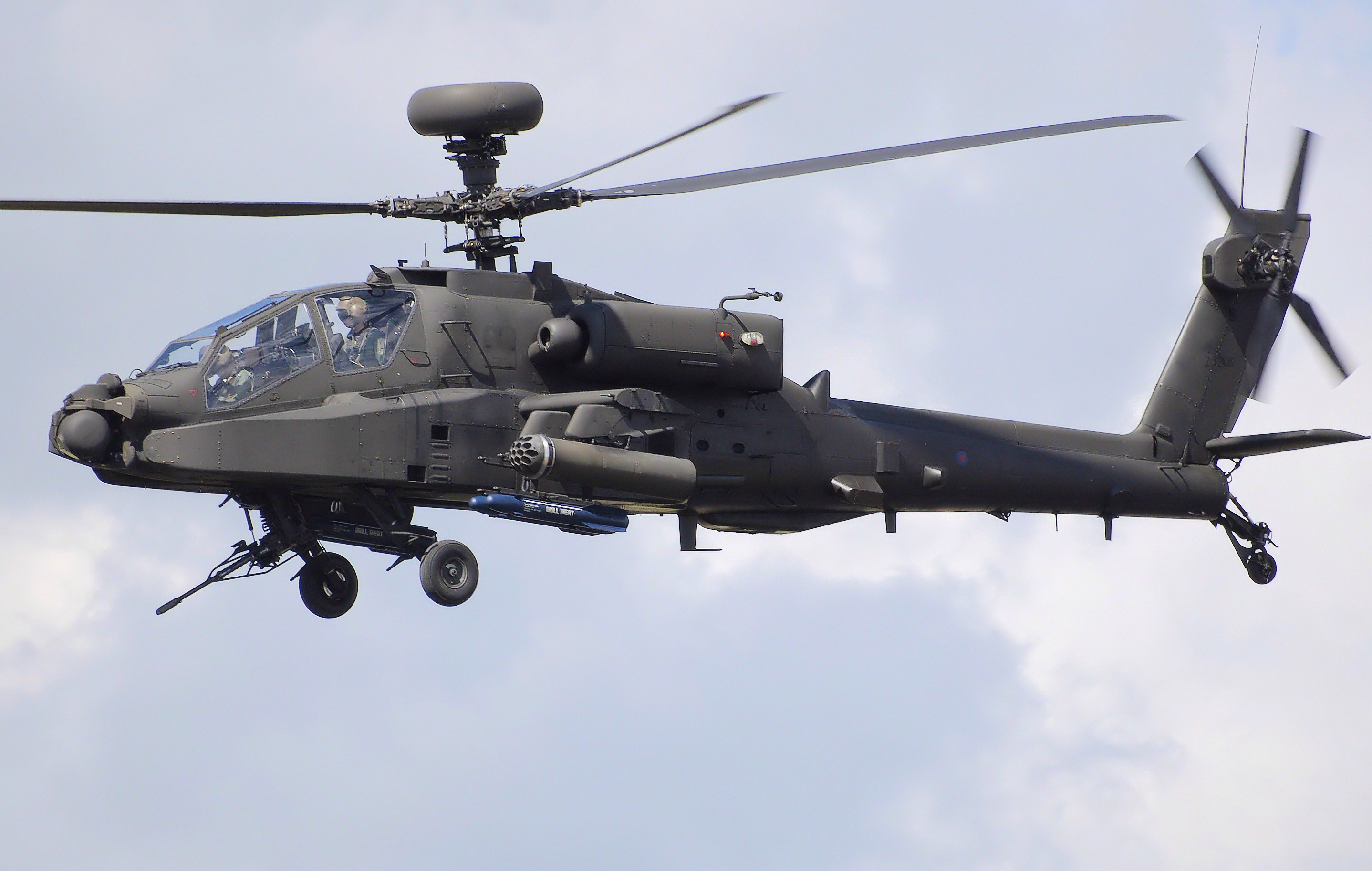
British AgustaWestland Apache helicopters are being used to attack Pro-Gaddafi forces from the British amphibious assault ship HMS Ocean

British and French forces began employing helicopter attacks against Libyan targets on 3 June as part of Operation Unified Protector. The attack helicopters were used to attack communications and control facilities, and were able to target Gaddafi forces in populated areas while minimizing risks to civilians. According to UK Defense Secretary Liam Fox, the employment of helicopters was an extension of the way in which fast jets had been used in ground attacks and did not signify a change in tactics.

Operating from HMS Ocean, British AH1 Apache attack helicopters armed with Hellfire missiles and heavy chainguns disabled a military checkpoint and a radar station near Brega. British attack aircraft supported the helicopters by destroying one military installation. Meanwhile, two munition storage depots were destroyed in a separate mission in central Libya. The operation was concluded successfully, and both helicopters returned to Ocean.

Operating from Tonnerre, French Gazelle and Tiger attack helicopters targeted fifteen military vehicles and five command posts at unknown locations.

NATO jets launched a series of fresh airstrikes against targets around the country. According to an anonymous Libyan government official, an educational institute in eastern Tripoli where military officials and civilians studied engineering, computers, and communications was among the targets hit.

=== Rebel offensives ===
On 3 June, rebels captured four towns from government forces in the Nafusa Mountains Campaign in the western part of Libya. On the following day fighting continued in another part of the mountain range, near the Tunisian border, with government forces reportedly using Grad rockets. Clashes also took place between government and opposition forces in Khoms.

NATO attacks continued to hit government targets around the country with increasing frequency, especially in and around Tripoli. Rebel forces in the Nafusa Mountains advanced somewhat closer to Tripoli, taking the strategically important town of Yafran on 7 June, which strengthened their control of the mountains area. This left the rebels less than 160 kilometres (99 mi) from Tripoli. The same day, NATO launched at least forty airstrikes against government targets in Tripoli. The Bab al-Azizia compound was heavily bombed, with a government soldier claiming that it was subjected to eight airstrikes. On 8 June, Gaddafi forces again advanced on Misrata, with renewed shelling killing 10 rebels and injuring 24. In Tripoli, NATO attacks briefly ceased during the day, but resumed in the evening. On 9 June, NATO launched another series of airstrikes, hitting targets on the outskirts of Tripoli.

The following day, Gaddafi forces shelled the outskirts of Misrata, and launched ground attacks on the city which were repelled by rebel resistance, while NATO aircraft attacked government vehicles and a rocket launcher. Rebels claimed that 16 rebels and 50 loyalists were killed, and that at least 40 rebels were wounded, in addition to civilian casualties. Another 61 were wounded when loyalist forces shelled Dafniya with tanks, artillery, and incendiary rockets. However, a subsequent attack by loyalist infantry and armor was repulsed. Loyalist forces also surrounded Zliten. According to rebel military spokesman Ahmed Bani, the troops were equipped artillery and Grad rockets. Residents were allegedly threatened with shelling and rape by mercenaries if they did not surrender. Clashes between rebel and government forces broke out in Zliten, with regime forces shelling the city, while NATO aircraft attacked government forces in the area. NATO airstrikes hit Tripoli the same day, hitting either the Bab al-Azizia compound or a nearby military barracks. Libyan state television also reported that airstrikes hit targets in the Ain Zara neighborhood.

On 11 June, rebel forces fought their way into Zawiya, and continued advancing from the west. London-based National Transitional Council spokesman Guma el-Gamaty announced that the rebels had captured a large part of the western side of the city. NATO airstrikes also hit mobile radar units in Metiga, weapons depots in Jufra, Waddan, and Hun, and targets in Tripoli. Government commander Khweldi Al-Hmeldi was allegedly wounded. Government forces set up checkpoints to the west of Zawiya, and closed the coastal road. Government soldiers continued shelling Misrata, and clashes continued around Zliten.

On 12 June, Libyan government spokesman Moussa Ibrahim announced that the rebels were defeated in Zawiya. Reporters taken to Zawiya saw secure streets and Gaddafi's national flag in the central square. Government forces also continued to shell Misrata, and attack rebel forces massed in Dafniya with tanks, artillery, and incendiary rockets. Clashes also took place in Misrata and Zliten. In an attack on Brega, four rebels were killed and dozens injured. NATO aircraft bombed the Bab al-Azizia compound and a military airport. Meanwhile, protests were reported to be occurring in Sabha, with youth and members of an anti-Gaddafi tribe protesting against the government and preparing weapons.

On 13 June, opposition forces launched an offensive in the Misrata area, and managed to push Gaddafi forces out of the area in fierce fighting, despite heavy shelling by government troops. The rebels fought their way to within 10 kilometres (6.2 mi) of Zliten. The Misrata refinery was hit by six rockets which damaged its generators. However, government forces ambushed rebels in Brega, killing 23 and wounding 26. The same day, NATO conducted 62 airstrikes against targets in Tripoli and four other cities. NATO helicopters attacked two Libyan Navy boats off the coast of Misrata, and military equipment and vehicles concealed beneath trees in Zliten.

On 14 June, government bombardments in the Nafusa Mountains continued, while clashes continued as the rebels attacked towns under Gaddafi control. NATO jets bombed the Bab al-Azizia compound and two other targets in Tripoli. NATO aircraft also dropped propaganda leaflets urging government soldiers to abandon Zliten. Throughout the following days, NATO jets and helicopters continued to target the Bab al-Azizia compound and military targets across Libya. However, on 18 June, a NATO airstrike mistakenly hit a rebel column, and expressed regret for any casualties that may have resulted. The following day, government forces ambushed a group of rebels near Dafniya, killing five. Meanwhile, rebel forces began conducting a flanking operation against Gaddafi forces to push them from Zliten.

As the rebel offensive progressed, opposition fighters conducted small-scale attacks against government forces in Tripoli, although few of the attacks were apparently effective. Residents claimed that several significant assaults took place in late May and early June. At night, gunfire was frequently heard in the city, with some residents claiming that it was security forces clashing with opposition fighters, and Libyan authorities claiming it to be celebratory gunfire. In addition, protesters held "flash" protests, chanting anti-Gaddafi slogans for several minutes before melting away, hanged the rebel flag from bridges, and spray-painted anti-Gaddafi graffiti at night. Due to fears of rebels smuggling weapons into the city, authorities set up checkpoints in the city and roadblocks at the entrances, searching cars. According to some media reports, poorly trained students were given weapons and told to man checkpoints, due to a shortage of regular military forces in the city.

On 19 June, nine civilians were killed in a NATO airstrike on Tripoli. Reporters were taken to the location of the strike and saw bodies being pulled out of the rubble of a destroyed building. NATO said that it was investigating the reports. Later in the same day, NATO acknowledged being responsible for the airstrike and the civilian deaths. NATO claimed that it was targeting a missile site, but that a bomb apparently missed its target due to a weapon systems failure and hit a civilian target instead. On the front-line, the fights continued around Dafniya near Misrata with artillery fire from both sides.

On 20 June, Gaddafi government officials claimed that NATO killed 19 civilians in the town of Sorman, 70 km (43 mi) west of Tripoli. This came only a day after NATO admitted to accidentally killing civilians in a separate airstrike in Tripoli. NATO stated that the target in Sorman was a military command and control node.

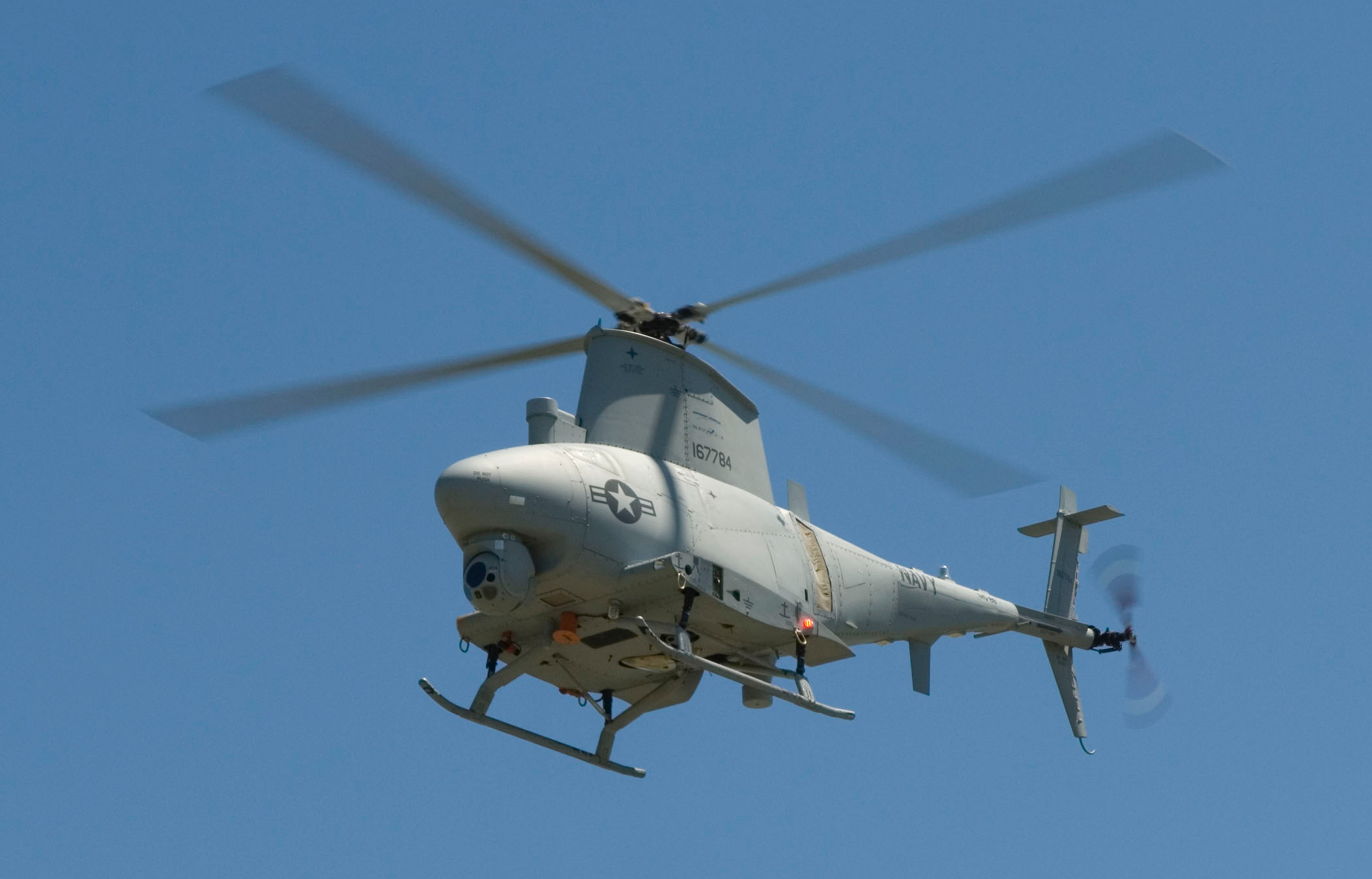
A U.S. Navy MQ-8 Fire Scout UAV helicopter like the one shot down by Gaddafi forces on 21 June.

On 21 June, an MQ-8 unmanned helicopter drone of the United States Navy was shot down by government forces while on a reconnaissance mission. Meanwhile, government shelling of Misrata continued, while six rebels were killed and fifty wounded during clashes in Dafniya. Near Zliten, more than 150 land mines were discovered and removed.

NATO continued its airstrikes on Gaddafi forces, conducting 44 strikes the following day. Meanwhile, fighting in and near Zliten continued, while Gaddafi forces continued to bombard rebel-held areas.

On 26 June, rebel forces in the Nafusa Mountains took the initiative and engaged in fierce fighting with forces loyal to Gaddafi around Bir al-Ghanam, 80 km (50 mi) from Tripoli. Meanwhile, NATO increased its airstrikes in western Libya during the week, striking more than 50 military targets. Tripoli and Gharyan were repeatedly hit, along with a network of tunnels storing military equipment about 50 km (31 mi) southeast of Tripoli. NATO strikes also hit government military targets in Brega on 25 June. On 1 July, NATO aircraft attacked two vehicles near Bir al-Ghanam, a town in the Nafusa Mountains along a road leading to Tripoli. Gaddafi forces continued to attack Misrata, reportedly in a bid to keep the rebels pinned down there and prevent an advance on Tripoli.

On 6 July, opposition forces in strongholds in the Misrata and the Nafusa Mountains attacked Gaddafi forces in separate coordinated attacks. The Misrata offensive sought to repel Gaddafi forces in Zliten, a town located on the route to the Libyan capital. Rebel fighters came with technicals armed with anti-armor weapons and overwhelmed a military base in the village of al-Qawalish. Clashes between rebels and government forces continued, with Gaddafi forces fighting to recapture al-Qawalish and striking rebel areas and a road linking Kikla to Assaba intermittently with Grad rockets and anti-tank cannons. In response to the advance, the Libyan government reportedly began arming civilians in the areas it held, and formed militias composed entirely of women. On 13 July, Gaddafi forces launched a dawn counterattack and briefly retook al-Qawalish, before being again pushed out by the rebel army.

On 14 July, the rebels claimed to have retaken al-Qawalish. Rebel forces also launched an attack on Brega, with the Libyan government claiming that NATO supported the attack by striking government targets from the sea and air. NATO confirmed that it had hit five targets in the vicinity of Brega, as well as targets in the vicinities of Gharyan, Sirte, Tripoli, Waddan and Zliten.

On 16 July 10 rebels were killed and 172 wounded during an advance on Brega, with four government soldiers reportedly captured. Fighting was reported near Bir Ghanam in the Nafusa Mountains. NATO strikes hit a range of military targets near Tripoli and Brega. The following day, rebel forces launched a renewed attack on Brega, claiming to have advanced from the city's outskirts into the streets in the center. On 18 July, the rebels claimed to have taken all of Brega after Gaddafi's forces withdrew to Ra's Lanuf. This is seen as a major victory since it gives the rebels access to 2 million barrels (320,000 m^{3}) of crude oil, as well as complete control over eastern Libya's oil network.

However, on 20 July, a rebel commander said that Gaddafi forces were inside Brega and that most of the rebels were between 5 and 10 km outside the city. The death toll on rebel side for this battle exceeded 50.

Clashes and NATO airstrikes continued in the following days. On 25 July, rebel forces carried out a major hostage-rescue operation behind enemy lines, freeing 105 civilians who had been abducted by government soldiers in Misrata on 24 April.

=== Assassination of Abdul Fatah Younis ===
On 28 July, the rebel army chief Abdul Fatah Younis was put under arrest by the NTC (the National Transitional Council) and was being held at an undisclosed garrison in Benghazi. Some of his soldiers returned from the front to ask for his release. The NTC later organized a press conference and announced the death of Younis. NTC minister Ali Tarhouni claimed that rebel fighters dispatched to bring Younis back to Benghazi had killed him on their own initiative. A pro-Gaddafi spokesman suggested that he was killed by his own side as they believed him to have been a double agent. Younis's top deputy, Suleiman Mahmoud, replaced him as head of the National Liberation Army, though the military command and local government in rebel-held Misrata declared that it would not take orders from the NTC to protest its handling of Younis's death.

=== Acceleration of the rebel offensive ===
At dawn on 28 July, rebels in Libya's Western Mountains launched an offensive against `Ayn al Ghazaya, a town near the Tunisian border. After capturing 18 government troops along with weapons and ammunition, the rebels captured the small towns of Jawsh, `Ayn al Ghazaya and Takut, while continuing to advance on the town of Badr and two other areas.

On 30 July, rebels encircled Gaddafi's last stronghold in the Western Mountains. Rebel tanks fired at Teji, where an estimated 500 government troops were stationed. The same day, NATO aircraft attacked and disabled 3 Libyan state television transmission dishes in Tripoli, on grounds that Gaddafi was using the media to incite attacks against civilians. The Libyan government claimed that 3 journalists were killed and 15 injured in the attacks.

On 31 July, rebel units aided by intensive NATO bombing broke through the front line in several places west of Misrata, advanced 14 kilometres (8.7 mi) and captured abandoned tanks, artillery and truck-mounted grad rocket launchers near the town of Zliten. In the Nafusa Mountains rebels captured one town, Hawamid, and surrounded a second, Tiji, 240 kilometres (150 mi) south west of Tripoli.

The rebels entered Zliten on 1 August, and defeated an attempt by Gaddafi's forces to retake the town on 3 August. Meanwhile, NATO bombed Zliten and Tajura, near Tripoli, and the rebels captured a Gaddafi ship laden with 250,000 barrels (40,000 m^{3}) of oil.

Rebels from the mountain town of Yafran launched a major attack on the town of Bir al-Ghanam and conquered it on 6 August by midday, after Gaddafi's forces retreated from the town. Meanwhile, Qatar supplied the rebels in Misrata with more weapons, and a renewed assault began on Brega. The government in Benghazi announced it had flown $10 million to the rebels in the Nafusa Mountains region.

NATO destroyed 4 command and control nodes on 7 August In the area around Zliten, one military facility, a weapons dump, an anti-tank weapon and a multiple-rocket launcher. Reporters in Bir Ghanam confirmed the rebels were in complete control of the town on 8 August, despite previous denials from the Gaddafi regime. The rebels destroyed a section of a pipeline carrying fuel to the regime's only electricity plant, causing permanent damage to the regime's generating capacity and resulting in widespread blackouts in Tripoli.

NATO bombed a warship in Tripoli's harbour after observing weapons were being removed from it on 9 August. On 12 August, rebels from Misrata took most of the town of Taworgha.

The Libyan government responded to the successful rebel advance with missile attacks on 13 August. Scud missiles were fired on rebel positions from near Sirte, Gaddafi's now-isolated home town 300 km (190 mi) east of Tripoli. It exploded to the east between the rebel-held towns of Brega and Ajdabiya, said a US official. The missile, tracked by a US destroyer, came down in the desert, causing no casualties. NATO condemned the use of Scud missiles. Estimates vary, but having relinquished five longer-range Scud-C variants originally obtained from North Korea, Jane's Strategic Weapons Systems believed Gaddafi could have had as many as 240 Scud-Bs in storage, purchased from the Soviets in 1976. The version used by Gaddafi's forces is designed for battlefield use – unmodified, it is capable of travelling 300 km (190 mi) with a 985 kg (2,172 lb) payload. There are convincing intelligence reports that, with the assistance of Egypt, Iran and North Korea, its range could have been extended to 325 km (202 mi), or even 400 km (250 mi).

=== Tripoli surrounded ===
On 13 August, the rebels started an offensive toward the coast from the Nafusa Mountains. On the first day of the advance, they managed to enter Zawiya and Gharyan, towns controlling the two remaining supply routes to Tripoli, but encountered heavy resistance from loyalist forces. They attempted to capture the Ras Ajdir border crossing with Tunisia but were repelled.

From 14 to 15 August, rebel forces captured Sorman, Sabratha, and Gharyan. The rebels had still not taken the center of Zawiya, with fighting also continuing in Brega. A rebel commander told Agence France-Presse that they controlled the western and southern gate of Zawiya while government forces were controlling the east and the center of the town. He also stated that they managed to push 3 km inside the city but were suffering heavy casualties from sniper fire.

On 16 August, rebel forces supported by NATO air strikes started a 48-hour operation securing key towns such as Gharyan around the capital. They then began cutting off fuel and supply lines, effectively leaving Tripoli under a state of siege.

On 18 August, US officials reported that Gaddafi was making preparations to flee to exile in Tunisia with his family. The same day, rebel forces seized control of the crucial oil refinery in Zawiya while journalists confirmed that they were in complete control of Gharyan. The rebels seized Zawiya's oil refinery on 19 August after three days of fighting. Battles continued over control of the city center. Gaddafi forces pounded rebel-held areas with rockets, mortars, and anti-aircraft guns, but were pushed out of a multistory hotel and the central square by nightfall. NATO bombing made it difficult for the government to reinforce its troops in the city, while continuing to hit targets in Tripoli. East of Tripoli, rebels from Misrata seized Zliten, suffering 31 dead and 120 wounded. According to a Libyan government official, Hassan Ibrahim, the brother of Libyan government spokesman Moussa Ibrahim, was killed and others also hit by gunfire from a NATO helicopter.

=== Battle for Tripoli ===
On 20 August, rebel elements in Tripoli supported by NATO launched a general uprising codenamed Operation Mermaid Dawn in the city. Many of the weapons used by rebels had been assembled and sent to Tripoli by tugboat. Opposition forces in the city launched a general uprising, surrounding almost every neighborhood, with especially heavy fighting occurring in Fashloom, Tajura, and Souk al-Jomaa. Rebels suffered high casualties, while Gaddafi forces also took losses. NATO warplanes supported the operation by conducting bombing runs over government targets in the city.

Following a night of heavy fighting, rebels controlled all or parts of the Tajura, Souk al-Jomaa, Araba, Qadah, Ben Ashour, and Zawiyat al-Dahmani, with fighting continuing in some areas the following day, including in Mitiga International Airport. Outside Tripoli, the rebel advance was rapid, with little resistance from government forces, although government troops put up a brief fight in the village of Al Maya. The rebels managed to take the base of the Khamis Brigade, 22 kilometres (14 miles) west of Tripoli in a brief gunbattle, after which they confiscated arms and munitions, and freed hundreds of prisoners detained there. The rebels continued to advance, taking towns and villages as Gaddafi forces melted away and managed to reach the outskirts of Tripoli, taking the suburb of Janzur, 10 kilometres (6.2 mi) west of Tripoli. Boats from Misrata landed rebel forces on the Tripoli coast. In Tripoli, Gaddafi forces and rebels battled over roof terraces to use as firing positions, and government snipers were stationed on rooftops near the Bab al-Azizia compound and a nearby water tower. Rebels used light weapons to defend their streets. In some neighborhoods, large anti-Gaddafi protests took place, with some coming under fire from snipers perched on rooftops.

Meanwhile, Misrata rebel forces tried breaking through to Tripoli, with an uprising in Khoms overnight on 21 August. Forces west of Tripoli tried to clear the road to Tunisia.

By 22 August, it was believed that Tripoli had largely fallen as rebel forces from outside poured into the city, with little resistance from Gaddafi troops. Green Square was taken and renamed to Martyr's Square, and there were reports that three of Gaddafi's sons were captured alive. However, later that day, reports came in that Mohammad Gaddafi had escaped. Heavy fighting took place near Gaddafi's compound Bab al-Azizia. At night between 22 and 23 August, CNN reporter Matthew Chance spoke to Saif al-Islam Gaddafi outside the Rixos Hotel, took pictures of him and a video putting earlier reports about his capture in serious discredit.

By 23 August in the evening, the rebels seized Gaddafi's own compound in Bab al-Azizia.

==== Gaddafi's wife and three children flee to Algeria ====
As the Battle for Tripoli reached a climax in mid-August, the Gaddafi family were forced to abandon their fortified compound. On 27 August, it was reported by the Egyptian news agency Mena that Libyan rebel fighters had seen five armoured Mercedes-Benz sedans, possibly carrying top Gaddafi regime figures, cross the border at the southwestern Libyan town of Ghadames towards Algeria, which at the time was denied by the Algerian authorities. On 29 August, the Algerian government officially announced that Safia Farkash, with daughter Ayesha and sons Muhammad and Hannibal, accompanied by their spouses and children, had crossed into Algeria earlier that day. An Algerian Foreign Ministry official said that all the people in the convoy were now in Algiers, and that none of them had been named in warrants issued by the International Criminal Court for possible war crimes charges. Mourad Benmehidi, the Algerian permanent representative to the United Nations, later confirmed the details of the statement. The family had arrived at a Sahara desert entry point, in a Mercedes and a bus at 8:45 a.m. local time. The exact number of people in the party was unconfirmed, but there were "many children", and they did not include Colonel Gaddafi. The group was allowed in on humanitarian grounds, and the Algerian government has since informed the head of the National Transitional Council, who had made no official request for their return.

==== Remaining Gaddafi family ====
Gaddafi and the whereabouts of other members of his family remained unknown. A LD 2 million bounty was placed by a group of businessmen, supported by the NTC, on anyone who brings Colonel Gaddafi to the NTC, dead or alive. After the fall of Tripoli, son Saadi stated in various media interviews that he had been authorised to negotiate a transfer of power to the NTC. On 31 August, Saif al-Islam claimed to be talking to Damascus-based Alrai TV from a Tripoli suburb, and said in an audio interview that "the resistance continues and victory is near". On 19 November, he was captured in the southern Libyan desert near the Niger border by the fighters from the Zintan Brigades. After his capture he was flown to Zintan. On 20 November, Abdullah Senussi, Muammar Gaddafi's brother-in-law, was also captured. He was found at his brother's house about 100 kilometers north of Sabha. He is currently being held in Sabha. International Criminal Court prosecutor Luis Moreno-Ocampo arrived on 22 November in Libya for talks with the Libyan government. Both Saif al-Islam and Abdullah Senussi are currently under indictment by the ICC in The Hague on charges of crimes against humanity, but will probably be tried in Libya first.

=== After the fall of Tripoli ===
With the taking of Tripoli by rebel forces, the largest cities under loyalist control were Tarhuna to the south of the capital, Sirte on the gulf, and Sabha with its military installations in the southern desert. Secondary cities were Bani Walid to the south of Tarhuna, and Hun between Sirte and Sabha.

==== Southern desert ====
The NTC said that the desert town of Hun had greater strategic value than Bani Walid or Sirte. The NTC had plans to deal with Hun and Sabha and its military bases after they take Sirte, but by early September local rebels had taken over part of the town and the NTC was sending in fighters. There have been attempts to cut off supplies to Sabha, but reports from the region are sketchy. Several smaller towns in the southern desert have fallen to the non-Arab Tubu.

On 21 September, the NTC reported its forces had captured Sabha. Remaining villages holding out against the revolutionaries were taken in the subsequent days, with anti-Gaddafi fighters seizing control of the garrison town of Ghat by month's end.

==== Tripolitanian interior ====
With loyalist forces expelled from Tripoli itself, fighting continued to the south of the city, with attacks on the airport from Tarhuna. Bani Walid further south had a large loyalist presence, but local officials had promised not to attack rebel positions, and there were no reports of fighting. By 28 August, however, there was fighting in Tarhuna, with its capture by rebels that day or the next. Khamis Gaddafi, the youngest son of Muammar Gaddafi and one of the regime's most notorious generals, was apparently killed by either a NATO strike or an ambush by rebel technicals in his attempt to flee Tarhuna for Bani Walid. Rebels then approached Bani Walid from both Tripoli and Misrata. Four attempts to seize the town failed, with pro-Gaddafi holdouts putting up fierce resistance and benefiting from Bani Walid's defensible terrain. The town was finally wrested from the control of pro-Gaddafi holdouts on 17 October, with many of its defenders fleeing into the surrounding valleys in the face of a concerted push by anti-Gaddafi reinforcements.

==== Western coast ====
Since the rebel taking of Sorman, both parties controlled part of the road between Tripoli and Tunisia, preventing either from supplying Tripoli from that country. The rebels made a successful attack on the border town of Ras Ajdir on 26 August, and on 28 August Tunisia reopened its border with Libya. It appeared that by that time rebels had taken the last intervening town, Ajaylat, consolidating the route to the capital, where shortages of food, water, fuel, and medical supplies were creating difficulties, though later reports indicated that a loyalist "pocket" remained at Ajaylat, with supply lines bypassing the town. Loyalist forces continued to shell the area from the interior.

==== Central coast ====
Despite the fall of Tripoli, loyalists continued to fight from Gaddafi's hometown of Sirte. Rebel forces approached from Misrata in the west and Benghazi in the east, but on both fronts they were held up by loyalists forces dug into small towns. On 27 August, eastern forces passed Bin Jawad, the last town of any size before Sirte. On 1 September, they announced that since Sirte has no economic importance, if it does not surrender, they would prefer to cut supplies and wait it out to minimize casualties.

In the afternoon of 8 September, it was reported that NTC forces had taken the Red Valley, a heavily defended area about 60 km east of Sirte.

On 16 September, the NLA took control over Sirte's airport and launched a major offensive into the city itself. Sirte fell on 20 October, and Muammar Gaddafi and several other leading regime figures including his son Mutassim were found and killed as they attempted to flee the city. The engagement marked the end of the war.

== Post conflict planning ==
=== Unfreezing of assets ===
From 20 August onwards, diplomats of the United States, the United Kingdom and France began working on a UN resolution to release some of the frozen Libyan assets to the NTC. Resistance was met from China and Russia, who felt that the move would formally recognise the NTC as the de facto government of Libya. On 25 August, the UN sanctions committee released $500 million of frozen Libyan assets following a direct request by the US. South Africa only agreed on the condition the money would be used for humanitarian purposes, but blocked the release of a further $1 billion for the NTC itself.

As a result, on 31 August, the British Royal Air Force flew the first LD 280 million of a shipment of LD 2 billion, that were blocked from entering the country at the start of the conflict. The money was to be handed over direct to the Central Bank of Libya, authorised by the UN on humanitarian grounds, and particularly to pay Libyan Government workers during Eid ul-Fitr, some of whom had not been paid for over three months.
