= Second Battle of Brega =

Battle for control of Brega during Libyan Civil War

Coordinates: 30°26′6″N 19°40′1″E

- Part of Libyan Civil War
Date	13–15 March 2011
Location	Brega, Libya
Result	Libyan government victory
Territorial changes	Libyan government forces remain control of Brega

Belligerents
(Libya) Libyan opposition	(Libya) Libyan government

Commanders and leaders
(Libya) Abdul Fatah Younis (Libya) Bashir Abdel-Qader (Libya) Khaled Kowati	(Libya) Muammar Gaddafi

Units involved
(Libya) National Liberation Army	Libyan Armed Forces

Strength
2,000	Unknown

Casualties and losses
5–7 killed	25 killed 71 captured

The Second Battle of Brega took place during the Libyan Civil War. Eleven days earlier, anti-Gaddafi forces had beaten back an attempt by loyalist forces to take the town on 2 March 2011, in the First Battle of Brega. Following that battle, rebel forces advanced along the Libyan Coastal Highway, taking the towns of Ra's Lanuf and Bin Jawad. However, after the Battle of Bin Jawad and the Battle of Ra's Lanuf, government troops retook all of the lost territory and were once again threatening Brega by mid-March.

== The battle ==
On 13 March, the regime's forces, advancing from Ra's Lanuf, succeeded in retaking Brega, though that night reports indicated that fighting was still ongoing and rebels possibly still controlled portions of the town. Reportedly, the rebels re-entered the town and heavy fighting ensued, after which government troops retreated to Brega's airport. However, just an hour later, it was stated that loyalist forces had pushed back rebel troops from the town to aj-Ojela, 20 kilometers east of Brega.

By the morning of 14 March, rebel forces were holding the residential district and loyalist forces were holding the oil facilities.

On 15 March, rebel forces had abandoned Brega and were in full retreat towards Ajdabiya. Ajdabiya itself came under ground attack just a few hours later, marking the beginning of the Battle of Ajdabiya.

== Aftermath ==
On 26 March, after loyalists lost Ajdabiya and retreated further down the coast, rebel forces recaptured Brega. A few days later, loyalist troops returned again, recapturing the city after a prolonged battle with rebel forces.
