= Battle of Brega =

Battle of Brega may refer to:

World War II

- Battle of Brega (1941), part of the Western Desert Campaign of World War II

Libyan civil war

- First Battle of Brega, fought on 2 March 2011
- Second Battle of Brega, fought 13 to 15 March 2011
- Third Battle of Brega, fought 31 March to 7 April 2011
- Battle of Brega–Ajdabiya road, fought 8 April to 14 July 2011
- Fourth Battle of Brega, fought 14 to 21 July 2011
