= Fall of Bin Jawad (2016) =

ISIS took over the Libyan city of Bin Jawad on 4 January 2016 after fighting in Tripoli against forces loyal to the Libyan provisional government.
