= First Battle of Brega =

2011 battle in Libya

Coordinates: 30°26′6″N 19°40′1″E

- Part of Libyan Civil War
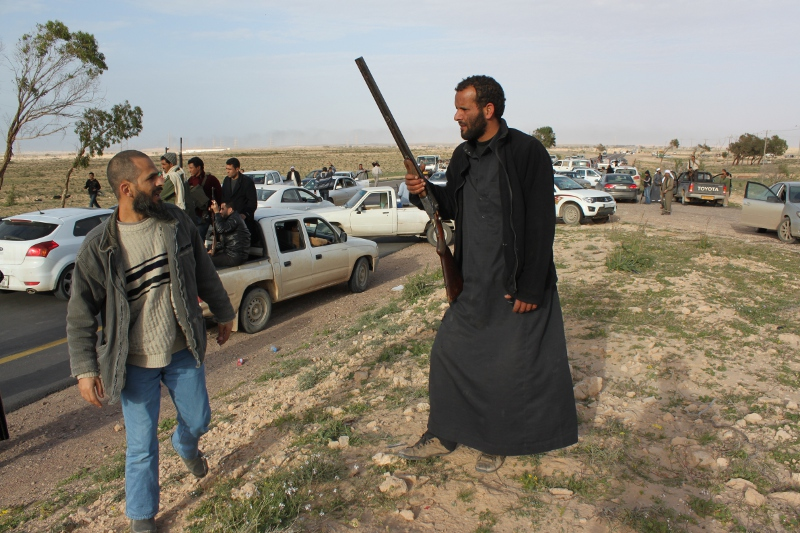
- Anti-Gaddafi rebels in Brega
Date	2 March 2011
Location	Brega, Libya
Result	Anti-Gaddafi victory: Pro-Gaddafi forces fail to recapture Brega

Belligerents
(Libya) Anti-Gaddafi forces: National Liberation Army	(Libya) Armed forces of the Libyan Arab Jamahiriya

Commanders and leaders
(Libya) Abdul Fatah Younis (Libya) Bashir Abdel-Qader (Libya) Khaled Kowati	(Libya) Muammar Gaddafi

Strength
300–350 combatants One tank Dozens of technicals	200–400 combatants Two fighter jets 50 technicals 120mm artillery

Casualties and losses
14 killed 12 captured 28 wounded	2–10 killed 4 captured 1 F1 shot down

The First Battle of Brega was fought during the Libyan Civil War. It began when pro-Gaddafi government troops attacked the city, held by the National Transitional Council, in the early hours of 2 March 2011.

== The battle ==
In the early hours of 2 March, well-armed pro-Gaddafi government forces arrived at Brega in over 100 vehicles. They succeeded in wresting control of the oil refinery, port, terminal and industry airport, as well as the town university. Coming within 2–3 kilometers (1.2–1.9 miles) of the town center, the pro-Gaddafi forces managed to pin down rebel forces. According to a number of news sources, the rebels were rushed to mobilization and hid in the sand for camouflage. Most were volunteers from the rebel-controlled cities of Ajdabiya and Benghazi.

As the attack was underway, Libyan Air Force pilots loyal to Gaddafi bombed a munitions depot at Ajdabiya. However, after a few hours, rebel reinforcements from Ajdabiya arrived in Brega and pushed back pro-Gaddafi fighters to the university campus where they came under siege. Moving along the coast, rebel fighters charged over the sand dunes on the beach up the hill to the university building, while under constant mortar fire. At one point, a warplane attacked the dunes in an attempt to disperse the rebels, but it caused no casualties, and the siege continued. According to the rebels, the pro-Gaddafi forces at the university used civilians as human shields. Government troops eventually withdrew from the university and out of the city some 8 kilometres (5.0 mi) to the west. A senior rebel officer stated pro-Gaddafi troops might have run out of ammunition and as such were forced to withdraw.

It was reported that women and children were dragged out of their cars on the Tripoli-Benghazi road by the pro-Gaddafi forces and used as human shields.

The government force retreated to Ra's Lanuf, about 120 km west of Brega, after the battle.

== Aftermath ==
At least 14 people were initially reported killed in the fighting, although some estimates were as low as five dead. Reporters who came in from the Benghazi area saw four dead, two of which were apparently pro-Gaddafi fighters. At least 14 opposition fighters were later reported killed and 28 others wounded. Eight of those killed were former oil workers. The rebels claimed that they had killed 10 loyalist soldiers and captured several others.

The assault on the Brega oil port was the first major regime counter-offensive against the opposition-held eastern half of Libya, where the population, backed by mutinous army units, rose up and drove out Gaddafi's rule during the first few days of the uprising. The offensive came while Gaddafi warned opposition forces that he would fight "until the last man and woman". Following the battle, celebrations were held by rebel fighters and residents in Brega and Ajdabiya. According to BBC correspondent John Simpson, the rebels were "very proud" and the general feeling in Brega was that Gaddafi's troops "do not necessarily have their hearts in the job."

On 3 March, pro-Gaddafi jets bombed the area between the oil refinery and the residential zone in Brega, rebels also reported an air raid against positions in Ajdabiya. Analysts believe the Battle of Brega indicates that either side may prove unable to definitely defeat the other. ' On 4 March, anti-Gaddafi fighters launched an attack against Ra's Lanuf. On 6 March the rebel advance was stopped in the battle of Bin Jawad and government forces recaptured Ra's Lanuf on 10 March. Anti-Gaddafi fighters were reported to have been advising civilians to leave the area around Brega in expectation of a second battle. The Second Battle of Brega was fought on 13 March and by the morning of 14 March, rebel forces were holding the residential district and loyalist forces were holding the oil facilities. The next day, the town fell to the loyalists.
