= Abdul Fatah Younis =

Libyan general

- عبد الفتاح يونس
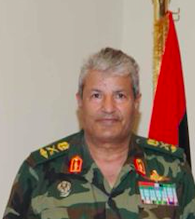
- Born: 1944; Jebel Akhdar, Libya
- Died: July 28, 2011 (aged 66–67); Benghazi, Libya
- Military career
- Allegiance: Kingdom of Libya (until 1969); Libyan Arab Jamahiriya (until 2011); National Transitional Council (2011)
- Branch: National Liberation Army
- Service years: 1964–2011
- Rank: Major General
- Conflicts: Egyptian–Libyan War; Chadian–Libyan War; Toyota War; First Libyan Civil War; Battle of Ra's Lanuf; First Battle of Brega; Battle of Bin Jawad; Second Battle of Brega; Battle of Ajdabiya; Second Battle of Benghazi; Late March 2011 Libyan rebel offensive; Third Battle of Brega; Battle of Brega-Ajdabiya road; Fourth Battle of Brega

Abdul Fatah Younis Al-Obeidi (/ˈɑːbdəl fəˈtɑː ˈjuːnɪs/; Arabic: عبد الفتاح يونس, sometimes transliterated Fattah Younis or Fattah Younes or Fatah Younes; 1944 – 28 July 2011) was a Libyan military officer and politician. He served as Libya's interior minister until his resignation on 22 February 2011 when he defected to the rebel side in the First Libyan Civil War. He was considered a key supporter of Muammar Gaddafi and even No. 2 in the Libyan government.

Following his resignation and defection, he urged that the Libyan Army should "join the people and respond to their legitimate demands". In an interview with John Simpson on 25 February, he said he believed Gaddafi would fight to the death, or commit suicide.

On 29 July 2011, Younis was reported dead by Libya's National Transitional Council (NTC) in unclear circumstances. According to the NTC's oil minister, Ali Tarhouni, Younis was killed by members of an anti-Gaddafi rebel group and the Libyan government stated that he had been killed by the rebels who suspected he was a double agent.

== Early life and career ==
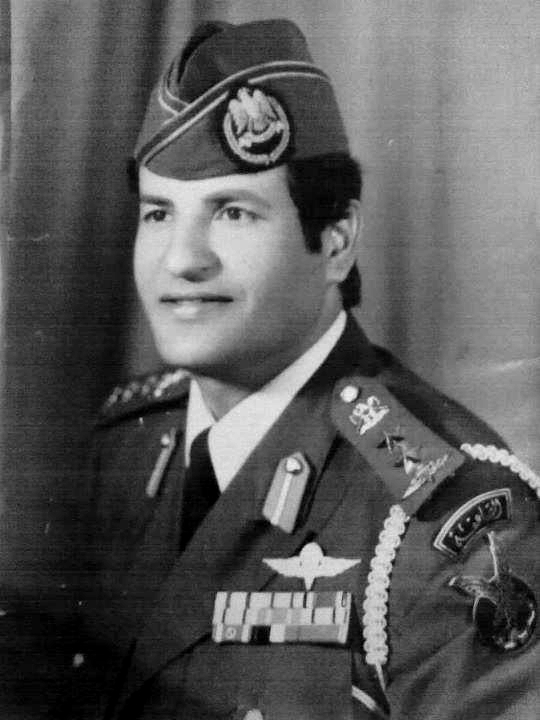
Younis as a colonel in 1970.

Abdul Fattah was a member of the Obeidat tribe of the Banu Sulaym in Cyrenaica. The Obeidat are one of the most respected and powerful tribes in Libya. Younis was a key figure in the 1969 Libyan revolution led by Muammar Gaddafi, and he became a member of his inner circle. He became minister for the public security, and attended a key meeting with the British ambassador to Egypt in 1992 where he apologised for Libya's involvement in the murder of Yvonne Fletcher, and offered to extradite her killers; he also admitted Libyan support of the IRA and offered compensation for their victims.

He had arrived in Benghazi commanding a special forces unit whose mission was to help relieve the besieged Katiba compound, which had sheltered the remaining loyalist forces in the city since 18 February, and which was undergoing almost continuous attack. He claimed to have ordered his soldiers not to shoot at protesters, and negotiated an arrangement whereby the loyalists were permitted to retreat from the building and the city.

Following confirmation that Younis had indeed defected to the side of the rebels, he was declared commander-in-chief of its armed forces. In March, a military spokesperson announced that Khalifa Haftar had replaced Younis as commander of the military; however, the National Transitional Council denied this. By April, Younis held the role of commander-in-chief of the armed forces, with Omar El-Hariri serving as Younis's Chief of Staff, while Haftar took the third most senior position as the commander of ground forces with the rank of lieutenant general.

== Death ==
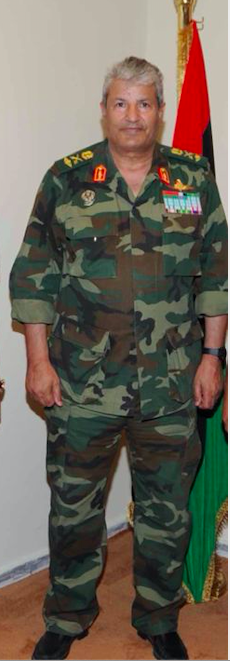
Abdul Fatah Younis in 2011, a few weeks before he was murdered

On 24 July, Younis was reported by Al Bawaba to have been killed under "mysterious circumstances" on the first day of the Fourth Battle of Brega without specifying where they got such information. Younis denied this report in a radio interview the next day.

On 28 July, Younis was placed under arrest to face questioning in Benghazi, the de facto capital of Libya under the NTC, on suspicion that his family had contacts with the Gaddafi regime. The NTC said that he was summoned from the Brega front to answer questions regarding the misuse of military assets, but he never made it to the meeting.

Later that day, Younis was killed under unclear circumstances. His body and those of two other officers were found dumped on the outskirts of Benghazi. They had been shot, and the bodies burnt afterwards. NTC head Mustafa Abdul-Jalil said Younis was killed by pro-Gaddafi assailants, and the head of the group responsible had been arrested. The Libyan government gave another version of the event, saying that Younis had been killed by the rebels because they thought he was a double agent.

At his funeral, Younis was hailed as a hero of the revolution by his nephew. However, as he was laid to rest, his son broke down and yelled: We want Muammar to come back! We want the green flag back!

=== Perpetrators ===
A member of the rebel special forces and close aide to Younis said that he was killed by another group of rebels known as the 17 February Martyrs' Brigade as a revenge attack for incidents that occurred when Younis was interior minister. Finance Minister Ali Tarhouni, a high-profile member of the National Transitional Council in Benghazi, said that the suspect arrested in connection with the murder was a rebel militia leader, who confessed that his subordinates shot and killed Younis, instead of bringing him to Benghazi for questioning as ordered. Tarhouni added that it was not the militia leader but his lieutenants that did it.

According to the NTC, Younis was "summoned from the front by a committee of four judges with the knowledge of the NTC's executive committee, the rebels' de facto government." However, the NTC said that it didn't know "why this arrest (warrant) was issued", "who was present at the meeting when the decision was made", or "on what basis the decision was made." According to military spokesman Colonel Ahmed Omar Bani, the judges who summoned Younis "did not have the authority do so" and "the defence minister had written a letter recalling the arrest warrant."

A rebel official, who spoke to AFP on condition of anonymity, said Younis was brought back to the Benghazi area on 27 July, and held at a military compound until 28 July, when he was summoned to the Defense Ministry for questioning. When they left the compound, two men from the security team escorting the detainees opened fire on Younis from their car with automatic weapons, said the officer, who was at the compound and saw the shooting. He said the two men were members of the 17 February Martyrs' Brigade and shouted that Younis was a traitor who killed their father in Derna, an eastern city. "The men's leader was shouting, 'Don't do it!' but they shot Younis and his two aides, and took their bodies in their car and drove away," the officer said. The NTC has confirmed that Younis was shot after he was released following questioning.

Tarhouni said it was not members of the 17 February Martyrs' Brigade but of another brigade, the Obaida Ibn Jarrah Brigade, who had killed Younis. Rebels say the Obaida Ibn Jarrah Brigade was composed mainly of former prisoners of Gaddafi's notorious Abu Salim prison in the capital Tripoli, who had always distrusted Younis. The brigade is named after one of the companions of Islam's Prophet Muhammad, and according to Reuters, the group is likely to have Islamist leanings. One rebel commander said Islamists whom Younis had targeted as interior minister may have killed him in retaliation.

Gaddafi's government claimed that a rebel militant group aligned with al Qaeda killed Younis.

In an October 2020 interview, Jalil denied ordering Younis' assassination, but accused Younis of collusion with the Gaddafi regime and alleged his defection was a ruse to preserve the "deep state" of the Gaddafi regime.

=== Prosecution ===
On 28 November, NTC chief military prosecutor Yussef Al-Aseifr announced that former NTC deputy prime minister Ali Abd-al-Aziz al-Isawi had been named chief suspect in the killing of Younis. Isawi denied involvement in the killing, saying he "never signed any decision relating to Abdel Fattah Younes."
