= Battle of Ajdabiya =

Battle of the 2011 Libyan Civil War

Coordinates: 30°45′20″N 20°13′31″E

- Part of the Libyan Civil War
Date	15–17 March 2011 (First phase); 21–26 March 2011 (Second phase)
Location	Ajdabiya, Libya
Result	Pro-Gaddafi victory in the first phase Anti-Gaddafi victory in the second phase

Belligerents
(Libya) Anti-Gaddafi forces (United Nations) UNSC forces: Joint Task Force Odyessy Dawn; France; (United Kingdom) UK; (United States) US	(Libya) Libyan Arab Jamahiriya

Commanders and leaders
(Libya) Abdul Fatah Younis	(Libya) Khamis Gaddafi

Units involved
(Libya) National Liberation Army; Free Libyan Air Force	Armed Forces of the Libyan Arab Jamahiriya; (Libya) Libyan Army; Libyan Air Force; Paramilitary Forces

Strength
Saaiqa 36 Battalion; Several hundred volunteers 2 fighter jets 3 helicopters	Four battalions (including some elements of the Khamis Brigade); Air support (until 18 March)

Casualties and losses
136 killed, 175 missing, 250 wounded,* at least 1 tank destroyed	20 killed, 20 captured, 3 tanks destroyed, 4–7 tanks captured, 2 armed oil tankers sunk and 1 damaged (First phase, unconfirmed rebel claims); 1 armed oil tanker damaged (First phase, independently confirmed); 21 killed, 6 captured, 24+ tanks, armored vehicles and mobile rocket launchers destroyed or captured (Second phase)
- 25–30 civilians killed
- *Numbers of killed, missing or wounded on the rebel side include civilians

The Battle of Ajdabiya was an armed battle in and near the city of Ajdabiya that took place as part of the Libyan Civil War. It was fought between anti-government rebels and military forces loyal to the Libyan leader Muammar Gaddafi. Following the Second Battle of Brega, in which pro-Gaddafi forces captured the town, Ajdabiya was the only major rebel-held city left en route to the rebel capital of Benghazi. The battle for Ajdabiya had been cited as a potential turning point in the conflict on which the fate of the whole rebellion may be decided. On 26 March 2011, Libyan rebels, backed by extensive allied air raids, seized control of the frontline oil town of Ajdabiya from Colonel Muammar Gaddafi's forces. During the first phase of the battle, pro-Gaddafi forces seized the strategic road junction leading to Benghazi and Tobruk, and captured most of the city. The city centre remained in rebel hands but was surrounded by pro-government forces and cut off from outside assistance. After the second phase, anti-Gaddafi forces recaptured the road junction and cleared loyalist forces from the city, sending them retreating down the Libyan Coastal Highway towards Sirte.

U.S. and European air units had been under the control of the Joint Task Force established for Operation Odyssey Dawn until control was transferred to the NATO Military Command Structure.

== Events ==
=== Prior to the battle ===
Ajdabiya was the site of anti-government protests on 16–17 February 2011 in which up to 10 people were said to have been killed, some by pro-government snipers. Protesters quickly took control of the city and declared it to be a "Free City" after burning down the local government headquarters.

=== First phase ===
On 15 March 2011, government forces advancing from Brega (which they had captured just a few hours earlier) hit Ajdabiya with a rolling artillery barrage. Air and naval strikes also hit the city. The city had been subjected to airstrikes for the previous three days. Rebels had stated on 13 March, that they would defend the city to the death. However, as soon as the attack started, all of the rebel forces that were not local (from Ajdabiya) were in full retreat, with some of the civilian population, toward Benghazi. Following the artillery strikes, loyalist ground troops attacked. The rebels had expected the loyalists to come in from the west, and they did. However, another separate government force had outflanked the rebels and attacked the city from the south. The loyalists quickly overran the western rebel defences and took the western gate into the city. Also, government soldiers had taken the eastern gate of the city, preventing any more rebels from retreating toward Benghazi. The city was surrounded and the junction at Ajdabiya was under government control, opening the way for them to Benghazi. After the encirclement was complete, government battle tanks went into Ajdabiya all the way to the city center. They encountered the rebel remnants and street fighting ensued. While the fighting was going on in the streets, two old rebel air-attack fighters, sent from Benghazi, attacked the government naval ships that had been pounding the city from the sea. According to independent news sources, only one ship was hit, while the rebels claimed they hit three warships, of which two sank. After a few hours, most of the city was under government control, however, in order to avoid surprise attacks by hidden rebels during the night, the tanks retreated to the outskirts of the city. The rebels thought they had won. However, just before midnight, a new round of artillery fire hit Ajdabiya, coming from the loyalist forces that were all around the town.

On 16 March, fighting continued with neither side having the upper hand in the battle or in full control of the town. Government forces returning from the front said in interviews that rebel resistance was fierce. During the day, a force of rebel reinforcements, coming from Benghazi, came to within a few kilometers from the eastern entrance to the city before they were engaged by loyalist troops. They made a small corridor to link up Benghazi with Ajdabiya, but pro-Gaddafi troops still had a strong presence on the eastern outskirts of the city. Also, rebels had managed to retake the southern entrance to the city, while the western entrance was still under government control. Three rebel helicopters had attacked pro-Gaddafi forces on the highway at the west entrance where they were preparing for a final push into the city with more weapons, ammunition and troop reinforcements coming in from Sirte.

Just after midnight on 17 March, government troops attacked the southern gate of the city. After three hours of fighting, they had retaken it. Later during the morning loyalist forces closed the corridor on the eastern side of the city. With this, the city was once again firmly surrounded. While the fighting was going on in Ajdabiya, more government troops landed from the sea, in an amphibious attack, at the small oil port town of Zuwetina, that is to the north on the road between Ajdabiya and Benghazi. The town fell quickly to loyalist forces. However, rebel leaders claimed that they had surrounded the government landing force and were engaging them. The next day the rebels claimed, several of their fighters, along with a number of civilians, were killed and 20 government soldiers captured in fighting at the port.

=== Second phase ===
With a no-fly zone put in place on 19 March, and air-strikes on Gaddafi's force's supply and tank convoys, the rebels on 20 March, started an advance from Benghazi to attempt to reach Ajdabiya. Along the way, they retook the town of Zuwetina. On 21 March, advancing rebel forces from Benghazi attempted to attack Ajdabiya, trying to relieve the rebels inside the city and drive out the loyalist troops. However, their attack was repelled by government troops supported by fire from tanks and multiple rocket launchers. The rebels retreated to a checkpoint 19 kilometres (12 mi) from the city. That night, U.S. aircraft fired on some loyalist positions at Ajdabiya, that were reported to be shelling the city.

The next morning, rebels, along with a Guardian reporter that was with them, claimed that the plumes of smoke from the city were from government targets that were hit by the U.S. air-strikes the previous night. The rebels claimed that at least three loyalist tanks were destroyed at the eastern entrance to the city by Coalition air-strikes. An Al Jazeera news crew filmed the wreckage of one tank at a checkpoint that was established by the rebels as part of the frontline.

On 23 March, coalition jets launched air-strikes against Gaddafi forces at the eastern gate. People fleeing the city stated that only the center of the city remained in rebel hands while the suburbs were under government control. Reporters from the Independent were led on a two-day tour of Ajdabiya by the government and saw no evidence of large-scale destruction that was claimed by the rebels.

On 24 March, Gaddafi's forces were still holding the main east and west gate areas of the city and most of the town, except the city centre, and managing to hold off the advancing rebel troops from entering the city with the help of mortar and artillery fire. Late on 24 March, some outside rebel forces managed to get into Ajdabiya, and the situation in the city was becoming fluid, with large parts of the town changing sides. During the night, British fighter jets launched air-strikes on Gaddafi force's tanks and armored vehicles.

By 25 March, the western and central part of the city were controlled by the loyalists while the eastern part was controlled by the rebels. Early in the morning, the opposition council relayed a message to Gaddafi's forces in the city through local tribal leaders. They called upon the loyalists to lay down their weapons and surrender. However, government troops refused the offer of surrender, and the rebels were starting to mass on the edge of the city for an offensive to attack Ajdabiya. During the afternoon, four rebel multiple rocket launchers, that were brought to the frontline, started firing on loyalist positions. Government artillery responded to the attack. Just before evening, the rebel offensive on the Gaddafi controlled areas of the city was called off after forward rebel units were repelled by loyalist armored units at the gates of the town further continuing the stalemate.

During the night, some rebel units were still managing to get into the city through the corridor established the previous evening and British aircraft destroyed seven loyalist tanks in and around the city. By this point, the city was divided between the loyalist-held western side and the rebel-held eastern side.

On 26 March, rebel fighters in Ajdabiya claimed to be in control of the city, a claim confirmed by Al Jazeera reporters on the ground. Libya's Deputy Foreign Minister Khaled Kaim said government forces pulled out of Ajdabiya after another night of coalition strikes, Reuters reports. He accused Western forces of directly aiding the rebels. Rebels then headed to Brega and managed to capture the city.

Al Jazeera received reports that pro-Gaddafi Libyan army general Bilgasim al-Ganga was captured by rebels during the night of 25 March.
