= Battle of Ras Lanuf =

2011 battle of the Libyan civil war

- Part of Libyan Civil War
Date	4–5 March 2011 (First phase); 6–12 March 2011 (Second phase)
Location	Ras Lanuf, Libya 30°28′44″N 18°33′58″E
Result	First phase: Libyan opposition victory Second phase: Libyan government victory

Belligerents
(Libya) Libyan Opposition; (Libya) National Liberation Army	(Libya) Libyan Government; Armed forces of the Libyan Arab Jamahiriya

Commanders and leaders
(Libya) Abdul Fatah Younis	(Libya) Muammar Gaddafi

Strength
Saaiqa 36 Battalion; 500–1,000 volunteers	3,000 (First phase) four battalions (Second phase)

Casualties and losses
16–26 rebels killed (First phase); 20 rebels killed (Second phase/bombardment); 15 killed, 65 missing (Second phase/ground fighting); 20 mutinous loyalists executed Total dead & missing: 136–146 killed or missing Total captured: 1,500 (Government claim)	2–25 soldiers killed, 2 pilots killed, 1 Su-24MK shot down (First phase); Unknown (Second phase)
- Location within Libya

The Battle of Ras Lanuf was a two-phase battle in early to mid-March 2011 during the Libyan Civil War between forces loyal to Libyan leader Muammar Gaddafi and those loyal to the National Transitional Council. Both forces sought control of the town of Ras Lanuf. The first phase of confrontation followed two days after the First Battle of Brega which occurred in the town Brega, roughly 130 kilometres (81 mi) to the east of Ras Lanuf. After conquering the town on 4 March, the rebels pushed further west to attack Sirte but they were driven back by government forces and on 11 March, government troops reconquered most of Ras Lanuf.

== The battle ==
=== First phase ===
According to the rebels, the loyalist forces used heavy weapons and helicopters to attack them one kilometre from the airport. One rebel reported seeing four men in front of him killed by an explosion. Rebels reported that there were defections from the local pro-Gaddafi military base in Ra's Lanuf.

Sometime during the night, rebel forces managed to capture the entire town of Ra's Lanuf, including the airport and military base. Following the capture of the base, the rebels claimed to have found the bodies of 20 soldiers who were executed after they refused to open fire on rebel forces.

In addition to the 20 mutinous soldiers who were reportedly executed, according to the rebels, various numbers of dead had been reported. 16 dead were reported on the rebel side with 31 wounded, and two to 25 loyalists ground troops were reportedly killed in addition to two loyalist pilots.

One Libyan Air Force jet bomber was reported to have been shot down outside Ra's Lanuf on 5 March, by anti-Gaddafi rebels.

=== Second phase ===
On 6 March, as the rebels were advancing from Ra's Lanuf toward Sirte, they were ambushed by Gaddafi's troops at Bin Jawad and suffered heavy losses. After that, they made a hasty retreat toward Ra's Lanuf where they were bombarded for four days.

During the next three days of constant air, tank and naval bombardment of the frontlines at Ra's Lanuf, 20 rebels were killed and at least 65 wounded.

On 10 March, the BBC reported that troops loyal to Muammar Gaddafi had cleared rebels from Ra's Lanuf. A rebel fighter told AFP news agency, "We've been defeated. They are shelling and we are running away. That means that they're taking Ra's Lanuf." Gaddafi attacked the city with tanks and artillery from the west and the south, ships fired upon the city from the north, while airplanes bombed the town. Rebel reinforcements from the east tried to enter the city, but were immediately attacked and a rebel commander reported dozens of his fighters were killed and many others were missing. Later that evening, most rebel forces had retreated from the town and were trying to set up a line of defense east of the city, while some hard-core opposition fighters were continuing to put up resistance in Ra's Lanuf. Four opposition fighters were confirmed killed during the fighting, 36 were wounded and 65 were missing.

By the evening of 10 March, all major news media were reporting that the town had fallen with large numbers of rebel fighters killed or captured, despite a denial from the rebel-led council in Benghazi. The government claimed that an estimated 1,500 rebel fighters had been captured. After the battle anti-Gaddafi fighters advised civilians to leave the area around Brega in expectation of continuing advances by government forces.

On the morning of 11 March, the first loyalist ground troops entered the town with 150 soldiers, backed up by three tanks, and managed to get to the city center. At the same time, four transport boats came in from the sea and unloaded 40-50 soldiers each on the beach near the Fadeel hotel. They were engaged by hard-core rebel remnants, who had not retreated from Ra's Lanuf the previous day. Government troops captured the residential area, but the rebels continued to hold out in the oil port facilities for a few hours before they too retreated from Ra's Lanuf east of the city. The town had fallen. However, in the afternoon, the rebels regrouped, mounted a counteroffensive and managed to expel the loyalist forces from the eastern part of the town. Government soldiers still held the western part of the city and a stalemate soon developed.

On 12 March, rebels fighting in Ra's Lanuf retreated in the afternoon to the town of Uqayla west of Brega and rebel leaders confirmed that pro-Gaddafi forces had driven them 20 km out of the town and captured the oil refinery. Later during the day, the government took foreign journalists to the city for confirmation of the town's fall.

== Aftermath ==
After the battle the town was firmly in loyalist hands and government troops advanced further east taking the towns of Brega and Ajdabiya and reaching Benghazi. However, on 19 March, a military intervention by the UN started. The air strikes by Coalition aircraft pushed back government troops which allowed the rebels to retake a string of towns. On 27 March, pro-Gaddafi forces in Ra's Lanuf were observed retreating towards Sirte. This allowed the anti-Gaddafi forces to retake control of the city. However, this would not last and once again, just three days later, government troops routed the rebels during a counter-attack from Ra's Lanuf on 30 March, taking back the town.

Anti-Gaddafi forces recaptured the city in August, but then on 12 September at least 15 oil refinery guards were killed and two wounded by pro-Gaddafi fighters.
