= Bin Jawad =

Bin Jawad بن جواد
- Town
- Location in Libya
- Coordinates: 30°48′03″N 18°05′11″E
- Country: Libya
- District: Sirte
- Elevation: 33 ft (10 m)

Population (2010)
  - Total: 8,488
- Time zone: UTC+2 (EET)

Bin Jawad /ˌbɛn dʒəˈwɑːd/ (Arabic: بن جواد Bin Jawād), also known as Bin Jawwād, Bin Quwad is a town with estimated 8,488 inhabitants in the Sirte District in Libya. It is approximately halfway between Benghazi and Misrata. The nearest settlements are Nofaliya, which is about 20 km to the west, and the port of Sidra, which is about 30 km to the southeast of Bin Jawad.

== Libyan Civil War ==
During the Libyan Civil War, anti-Gaddafi forces moved into the city on 5 March 2011. Forces loyal to Gaddafi infiltrated the city by night and attacked the anti-Gaddafi forces on the next day which resulted in the Battle of Bin Jawad. The anti-Gaddafi forces fled the town and on 7 March 2011, it was back in the hand of the government. The pro-Gaddafi forces continued to push further east and started the second phase of the battle of Ra's Lanuf.

On 27 March 2011, rebels returned to Bin Jawad and recaptured the town. However, by 29 March, pro-Gaddafi forces had halted the rebels advance and forced them to flee the town. The rebels briefly returned and a battle broke out for the town. By the end of the day, after a series of artillery duels, the rebels retreated from the town in hundreds of vehicles, some of them as far as Ra's Lanuf.

On 23 August 2011, loyalist forces began to disintegrate due to the rebel assault on Tripoli. At the same time, rebel forces advanced from the east, taking Brega and Ra's Lanuf and once again advanced on Bin Jawad.

Rebel forces reported that they had successfully re-taken Bin Jawad on 28 August 2011.

== Later events ==
In January 2016, the Islamic State's Libyan branch (IS) seized control of the town, but were driven out by government forces in May 2016.

== See also ==
- List of cities in Libya
- Bin Jawad District
