= Battle of Bin Jawad =

2011 battle in Libya

Coordinates: 30°48′3″N 18°5′11″E

- Part of Libyan Civil War
Date	6 March 2011
Location	Bin Jawad, Libya
Result	Libyan government victory

Belligerents
(Libya) Libyan Opposition	(Libya) Libyan Government

Commanders and leaders
(Libya) Abdul Fatah Younis	(Libya) Muammar Gaddafi

Units involved
(Libya) National Liberation Army	Libyan Armed Forces; (Libya) Libyan Army

Strength
500–1,000	1,500

Casualties and losses
12–60 killed 700 missing* 60 wounded	At least 1 killed 1 helicopter shot down
- *170 of the 700 missing were found in a mass grave in December 2011

The Battle of Bin Jawad took place in early March 2011 during the Libyan Civil War between forces loyal to Libyan leader Muammar Gaddafi and anti-Gaddafi forces for control of the town of Bin Jawad.

== Battle ==
On 5 March 2011, following the Battle of Ra's Lanuf, rebel forces advanced along the Mediterranean coast and captured the town of Bin Jawad. They stopped during the night in the hamlet and planned to continue on to Sirte in the morning. During the evening, the opposition forces pulled back to Ra's Lanuf so they could prepare to continue their push to the west.

On the morning of 6 March, the rebels were on the move again and were passing through Bin Jawad, when they realized that loyalist forces had entered the town the previous night and taken up positions in houses and on rooftops in preparation for an ambush. Government troops opened fire on the rebels with machine guns and RPGs and the opposition forces were soon in full retreat toward Ra's Lanuf. During the chaos, about 50 rebel fighters were left behind and trapped inside a Bin Jawad mosque. An opposition force in 20 pickup trucks tried to surge back into the city and rescue them, but was hit by artillery fire and one truck was destroyed. The rest of the convoy quickly retreated back to the edges of the town. Gaddafi's forces had retaken Bin Jawad.

As the rebels were retreating east of Bin Jawad, they were hit by helicopter and air strikes. After getting a chance to regroup, rebels moved up several multiple-rocket launchers from Ra's Lanuf and fired toward Bin Jawad. However, loyalist troops had also pulled up their heavy weapons and an artillery duel followed. The new rebel frontline was established three kilometers east of the town.

During the fighting, one military helicopter was reported to have been shot down by the rebels and crashed in the sea.

Meanwhile, in Ra's Lanuf, loyalist air strikes hit the air base, held by the rebels. At least two people were killed and 40 wounded.

By the morning of 7 March, the BBC reported that the town was under the control of government forces and they were advancing on Ra's Lanuf.

On 9 March, the rebels attempted to move against Bin Jawad once more. However, after firing off around 50 rockets and making some advances, they were hit by artillery and air strikes and retreated to Ra's Lanuf. According to the rebels, at least 50-60 fighters were killed in the initial fighting on 6 March, and, according to one rebel fighter, 700 were missing. In December 2011, a mass grave containing the bodies of 170 of the 700 missing rebel fighters was discovered near the town.

== Aftermath ==
The Battle of Bin Jawad marked the end of the initial rebel offensive. Proving to be the high-water mark of the rebel offensive, it marked the end of the rebel advance westward at the time, and opened the way for a government counter-offensive that took pro-Gaddafi forces as far as the gates of Benghazi, before being pushed back by UN intervention.

On 27 March, rebels entered Bin Jawad after coalition air-strikes on tanks positioned there, and managed to recapture the town. However, on 29 March, they retreated once again under heavy artillery fire from loyalist forces.

Rebel forces eventually returned to Bin Jawad again some months later, in a separate engagement after the fall of Tripoli in August 2011, and successfully retook the town on 28 August 2011.

== See also ==
- First Gulf of Sidra offensive
