= Ras Lanuf =

Ras Lanuf راس لانوف
- Town
- Location in Libya
- Coordinates: 30°35′12″N 18°24′43″E
- Country: Libya
- Region: Tripolitania
- District: Sirte
- Time zone: UTC+2 (EET)
- License Plate Code: 51

Ras Lanuf (/ˌrɑːs ləˈnuːf/ (Arabic: راس لانوف Raʾs Lānūf, also: Ra’s al-Unūf)) is a Mediterranean town in northern Libya, on the Gulf of Sidra in Tripolitania. The town is also home to the Ra's Lanuf Refinery, completed in 1984, with a crude oil refining capacity of 220,000 bbl/d (35,000 m^{3}/d). The oil refinery is operated by the Ra's Lanuf Oil & Gas Processing Company, a subsidiary of the state-owned National Oil Corporation. Additionally, the city houses the Ra's Lanuf petrochemical complex – a major oil terminal – and oil pipelines: the Amal–Ra's Lanuf, the Messla–Ra's Lanuf, and the Defa-Ra's Lanuf pipeline.

== History ==
=== Classical ===
Ras Lanouf was part of the Greek Pentapolis colonies. The traditional western boundary of the Pentapolis lay at Arae Philaenorum. Some historians claim it is 40 km west of El Agheila, while others place Arae Philaenorum near Ra's Lanuf, and the modern Italian commemorative arch featuring the Philaeni stood here before its destruction in 1973.

=== World War II ===
On 3 April 1941 there was a British war communiqué that in the North Africa Campaign in World War II in the night of 1 April 1941 Allied bomber aircraft heavily attacked German/Italian motor transport at Ra's Lanuf and destroyed many vehicles.

=== Growth under Gaddafi ===
Beginning in 1984, a major urban development program for Ra's Lanuf was initiated by the Brega and Ras Lanuf Higher Committee to accommodate employees of the nearby oil industries, and envisaged for 40,000 inhabitants. The general design of the town layout was to be linear, following the coast and allowing extensive views and easy physical connection with the sea from all parts of town.

The town's structure was based on a functional hierarchy, containing three centers forming public zones with community facilities extending to the Mediterranean coast; these were in turn surrounded by high-rise housing blocks. A pedestrian route links different public, commercial, and recreational facilities to residential areas. The project was carried out by Devecon Engineers and Architects.

=== Libyan Civil War ===
On 4 March 2011 after heavy fighting, anti-Gaddafi Libyan rebels captured Ra's Lanuf. The rebel advance was halted in the Battle of Bin Jawad and a counter-offensive by government forces opened the second phase of the Battle of Ra's Lanuf. After heavy bombardment from air, land, and sea, the government forces retook the city on 10 March. On 27 March rebels retook control of Ra's Lanuf as part of a rapid advance as 24 hours earlier they had retaken the strategic towns of Brega and Ajdabiya, but within a matter of days rebel forces retreated from the city once more in the face of a new government counter-offensive. On 23 August, rebels recaptured Ra's Lanuf from government loyalists and continued their advance towards Bin Jawad and Sirte. However, sporadic fighting continued in Ra's Lanuf into September.

== Administrative governance ==
Under the Ottoman Empire, Ra's Lanuf was part of Tripolitania under Italy after 1934, then occupied by the British as again part of Tripolitania. In 1983 it became part of the Bin Jawad District. Since 1987, it has been under the Sirte District.

== Economy ==
Ra's Lanuf is an import center for the petrochemical industry. The Ra's Lanuf Refinery has a capacity of 220,000 barrels per day (35,000 m^{3}/d). It is a part of larger petrochemical complex consisting of an ethylene plant, a polyethylene plant, plant utilities, and the Port of Ra's Lanuf. The Port of Ra's Lanuf consists of a small harbor, operated by the Veba Oil Company and RASCO. Its primary activities include loading crude oil and oil products. It has a maximum draft of 22 meters and is about 385 kilometres (239 mi) west of the Benina International Airport.

Ra's Lanuf is the terminus of the 251 km (156 mi) Defa-Ra's Lanuf oil pipeline and the 427 km (265 mi) Majid-Nafora-Amal-Ra's Lanuf oil pipeline.

Ra's Lanuf has two airports: Ra's Lanuf Oil (Code:HLNF) and Matratin (Code:FR3803).

Ra's Lanuf is to be a station on the new national railway system of Libya. In addition it is to be a construction base for the section to be built by Russian engineers, with a port for the delivery of supplies. The port will be connected to the base by a 7.5 kilometres (4.7 mi) branch line.

== Nearby cities and towns ==
- Sidra (13.1 nmi (24.3 km) west)
- Bin Jawad (20.0 nmi (37.0 km) west)
- El Agheila (36.0 nmi (66.7 km) east)
- Qaryat Bishr (36.1 nmi (66.9 km) east)
- Brega (42.8 nmi (79.3 km) east)
- Zella (128.7 nmi (238.4 km) south)
- Marada (84.1 nmi (155.8 km) south)

== See also ==
- List of cities in Libya
