= Casualties of the Libyan civil war (2011) =

Casualties of 2011 armed conflict

Estimates of deaths in the 2011 Libyan vary with figures from 15,000 to 30,000 given between March 2 and October 2, 2011. An exact figure is hard to ascertain, partly due to a media clamp-down by the Libyan government. Some conservative estimates have been released. Some of the killing "may amount to crimes against humanity" according to the United Nations Security Council and as of March 2011, is under investigation by the International Criminal Court.

== Deaths caused by government forces ==
On February 22, the International Coalition Against War Criminals gave an estimate that 519 people had died, 3,980 were wounded and over 1,500 were missing.

Human Rights Watch has estimated that at least 233 people had been killed by February 22.

On February 23, Italian Minister of Foreign Affairs Franco Frattini stated that according to his information 1,000 people had died so far.

On February 24, the IFHR said that 130 soldiers had been executed in Benghazi and Bayda, after they mutinied and sided with the protesters.

On February 25, Navi Pillay, the High Commissioner for Human Rights of the United Nations, said that reports indicated that "thousands may have been killed or injured".

== Deaths caused by rebel forces ==
Among the security forces there had been more than 1,700 dead, including civilians in support of the government, alleged mercenaries and government soldiers. There have been many reports that members of the security forces have been killed by both the government and the opposition.

On February 18, two policemen were hanged by protesters in Benghazi. Also, on the same day, 50 black Africans, mostly from Chad, were executed by the protesters in Bayda. Some of them were killed when protesters burned down the police station in which they locked them up and at least 15 were lynched in front of the courthouse in Bayda. The bodies of some of them were put on display and caught on video. By February 23, the government confirmed that 111 soldiers had been killed.

On February 23, a group of 22 government soldiers attempted to make a breakout from an air base near Derna, which had been under siege for days by rebel fighters. Within hours, all of them were captured and eventually 14 of them were shot execution style while a 15th was hanged by the opposition forces. Between February 15 and May 22, 37 former government loyalists were killed in Benghazi in revenge killings by some opposition groups.

Toward the end of the Battle of Misrata (February 18, 2011 – May 15, 2011), at least 27 sub-Saharan Africans from Mali, Niger or Chad, who were accused of being mercenaries, were executed by rebel forces.

== Deaths caused by Coalition forces ==
The Libyan official sources claimed that at least between 64 and 90 people were killed during the bombardments on the first two days of the U.N. intervention and another 150 had been wounded. The Vatican news agency claimed that in Tripoli alone, at least 40 civilians died as a result of the bombing campaign. According to the Libyan Health office, the airstrikes killed 1,108 civilians and wounded 4,500 by July 13.

- On April 1, NATO airstrikes killed 14 rebel fighters and wounded seven more on the frontline at Brega.
- On April 7, news reports surfaced that NATO bombers killed 10–13 rebels and wounded 14–22 near the eastern oil town of Brega.
- On April 27, at least one NATO warplane accidentally attacked the Libyan rebel forces position near the besieged city of Misrata, killing 12 fighters and wounding five others.
- On May 13, 11 religious imams were claimed to be killed and 50 others injured when a NATO airstrike struck a large gathering in Brega praying for peace in conflict-ridden Libya.
- On June 19, at least nine civilians were killed in a NATO airstrike on Tripoli. Reporters saw bodies being pulled out of a destroyed building. NATO acknowledged being responsible for the civilians' deaths.
- On June 20, The then Libyan government, claimed that 15 civilians including three children had been killed by a NATO airstrike on Sorman.
- On July 25, 11 civilians were claimed killed by a NATO airstrike on a medical clinic in Zliten.
- On July 30, 3 journalists were killed and 15 wounded in NATO attacks against the Libyan state TV Al-Jamahiriya, which continued to broadcast after the attacks.
- On August 9, the Libyan government claimed that 85 civilians were killed in NATO airstrikes on Majer, a village near Zliten. A NATO spokesman confirmed that they bombed Zliten on August 8 and 9, but said that he was unable to confirm the casualties. The Libyan government declared three days of national mourning. Reporters were later taken to a hospital where they saw at least 30 dead bodies including the bodies of at least two young children. The Libyan government claimed that the bodies of others killed in the airstrikes were taken to other hospitals. Commander of the NATO military mission in Libya, Lieutenant General Charles Bouchard said "I cannot believe that 85 civilians were present when we struck in the wee hours of the morning, and given our intelligence. But I cannot assure you that there were none at all".
- On March 2, 2012, after the conclusion of hostilities, the United Nations Human Rights Council released a comprehensive report concluding that in total 60 civilians were killed and 55 wounded by the NATO air campaign.

== Legal status ==
On February 26, 2011, the United Nations Security Council (UNSC) stated in UNSC Resolution 1970, "the widespread and systematic attacks currently taking place in the Libyan Arab Jamahiriya against the civilian population may amount to crimes against humanity" and referred "the situation" in Libya since February 15, to the International Criminal Court (ICC), a permanent tribunal that presently can prosecute individuals for genocide, crimes against humanity or war crimes. On March 4, the ICC assigned investigation of the case to Pre-trial Chamber I, consisting of Judge Cuno Tarfusser from Italy, Judge Sylvia Steiner from Brazil and Judge Sanji Mmasenono Monageng from Botswana.

NATO Secretary General Anders Fogh Rasmussen stated on March 28 that NATO was impartial and that it interpreted the terms of UNSC Resolution 1973 on the protection of civilians to apply to both rebel and government forces. The BBC stated that "the rebels felt they had a 'private understanding' of the NATO mission, [believing] that the western world has joined them in a campaign of regime change." The NATO Secretary General described the possibility that NATO would attack rebel forces who endanger civilian populations as "hypothetical" as of the date of the interview.

== Timeline of reported deaths per event ==
=== Combatant deaths ===
Date	Opposition fatalities	Government fatalities	Detail
February 16	1	None reported	Protests in Roujdane.
February 17–20	332–479	163	First Battle of Benghazi
February 17–25	300–700	None reported	Tripoli clashes
February 17	4–10	None reported	Protests in Ajdabiya.
February 18	2	None reported	Protests in Qubah.
February 18 – May 15	366	358	Battle of Misrata
February 20	4	None reported	Protests in Tobruk.
February 20	3	None reported	Protests in Zintan.
February 20	1	None reported	Protests in Zuwara.
February 21 – May 22	None reported	37	Revenge killings against loyalists in Benghazi.
February 21	15	3	Rebel capture of the La Abraq Airport in Bayda.
February 22–24	9	None reported	Protests in Gharyan.
February 23	2	15	Capture and execution of loyalist fighters at Derna.
February 24 – March 10	151	65	First Battle of Zawiya
February 26	22	None reported	Capture and execution of rebel fighters at Sirte.
Late February	3	None reported	Rebel attack on a military base at Gariyat.
March 1 – August 18	517–534	397	Nafusa Mountains Campaign
March 1 – July 20	27	None reported	Fighting at the Algerian-Libyan border.
March 2	14	2–10	First Battle of Brega
March 4–12	71–81	4–27	Battle of Ra's Lanuf
March 4	34–100	None reported	Explosion at an arms depot in Benghazi.
March 6	182–230	1	Battle of Bin Jawad
March 13–15	7	25	Second Battle of Brega
March 14	7	16	Government re-taking of Zuwara.
March 15–26	136	41	Battle of Ajdabiya
March 15	1	None reported	Rebel fighter plane crashes.
March 17	None reported	1–2	Bombing run on the Benghazi military air base.
March 18	3	None reported	Fighting in Zuwetina.
March 19–20	261	27–30	Second Battle of Benghazi
March 20	1	None reported	Killing of a rebel activist in Benghazi.
March 22–24	None reported	19–28	Coalition air-strikes on Tripoli.
March 26–30	12	7	First Gulf of Sidra offensive
March 28	1	None	Execution of captured rebel at Sirte.
March 31 – April 7	46–49	28	Third Battle of Brega
April 3 – June 15	25	3	East Libyan Desert Campaign
April 8 – July 13	75–87	94–95	Battle of Brega–Ajdabiya road
April 17	None reported	20	Rebel attack on a military headquarters in Zawiya.
May 4	1	None reported	Rebel fighter dies of wounds in Benghazi.
May 12	1	None reported	Rebel French mercenary killed in Benghazi.
May 16 – August 19	435	522–532	Battle of the Misrata frontline
May 28	12	3	Suppression of an opposition protest in Bani Walid.
May 29	2	3	Suppression of an opposition protest in Tripoli.
May	3	None reported	Execution of rebel prisoners in Khoms.
May	40	None reported	Execution of rebel prisoners near Tripoli.
June 2	None reported	2	NATO air-strike in 'Aziziya.
June 7	None reported	1	NATO air-strike in Tripoli.
June 9–16	22	12	Zliten uprising
June 11–12	30	2	Zawiya raid
June 11	1	None reported	Sabha clashes
June 13	6	None reported	Fighting west of Zawiya.
June 16	None reported	1	Attack on a military patrol in Tripoli.
June 17	3	None reported	Suppression of an opposition protest in Tripoli.
June 18	None reported	1	Rebel sniper fire in Tripoli.
June 19	None reported	4	NATO air-strike in Sabha.
June 23	None reported	9	NATO air-strike near Zliten.
July 13 – August 22	144	42	Fourth Battle of Brega
July 17 – September 27	28	51	Fezzan campaign
July 22	None reported	6	NATO air-strike on a pipeline production plant south of Brega.
July 24–26	None reported	7	NATO air-strikes on Zliten.
July 28	3	None reported	Killing of the rebel commander-in-chief in Benghazi.
July 29	4	5	Loyalist attack on a prison in Benghazi.
July 31	3–6	4–11	Attack on a loyalist hideout in Benghazi.
August 4	3	None reported	Msallata clashes
August 13–28	95	95	Rebel coastal offensive
August 20–28	1,700	128	Battle of Tripoli
August 23 – October 20	437	236–903	Second Gulf of Sidra offensive
August 28	None reported	5	NATO air-strike in Taruna.
August 28	None reported	20	NATO air-strike in Bani Walid.
August 29	153	None reported	Discovery of a killing site for mutinous soldiers in Tripoli.
September 3	1	None reported	Execution of a rogue rebel in Tripoli.
September 4	None reported	1	NATO air-strike near Tripoli.
September 4–18	10	None reported	Rebel firearms accidents in Tripoli.
September 8 – October 17	85–91	7–9	Battle of Bani Walid
September 11	12	None reported	Rebel inter-factional fighting in the Nafusa mountains.
September 12	15–17	None reported	Ra's Lanuf raid
September 24	9–11	None reported	Ghadames raid
October 4–11	10	None reported	Rebel inter-factional fighting in Zuwara.
October 14	1	2	Clashes in Tripoli.

Based on the numbers, between 5,904 and 6,626 opposition members/fighters (including some civilian supporters) and between 3,309 and 4,227 Gaddafi loyalists had been killed by October 23, 2011.

In addition, another 1,350 opposition fighters and activists have been confirmed as missing in the fighting in the east, 781–900 were reported to be missing in the Battle of Misrata, of which 163 were later confirmed dead when found in two mass graves, 136 went missing during the Nafusa Mountains Campaign, 74 were missing following the Battle of Brega–Ajdabiya road and up to 700 rebels were missing following the Battle of Bin Jawad, of which 170 were later found in a mass grave, for a total of 2,708–2,827 rebels reported missing.

In January 2013, the new Libyan government stated, based on unfinished research, that 4,700 rebel fighters and a similar number of loyalist soldiers were killed during the conflict. An estimated 2,100 rebels and loyalists were missing. No count was given on the number of killed and missing civilians.

=== Civilian deaths ===
Date	Civilian fatalities	Detail
February 24 – March 10	84–449	First Battle of Zawiya
February 18 – May 15	871	Battle of Misrata
March 1–13	39	Shelling of Zuwara.
March 6	1	Shooting in Bayda.
March 12	1	Killing of Al Jazeera cameraman near Benghazi.
March 15–26	25–30	Battle of Ajdabiya
March 18	3	Fighting in Zuwetina.
Late March – early May	1,400	Sinking of refugee boats while they were trying to reach Italy.
April 5	1	Third Battle of Brega
April 8 – June 25	27	Battle of Brega–Ajdabiya road
April 12	1	Woman refugee dies before reaching Malta.
April 21 – May 25	5	East Libyan Desert Campaign
May 16 – August 19	14	Battle of the Misrata frontline
May 22	4	Fire at a refugee camp in Tunisia near the border.
May 24	2	Clashes at a refugee camp in Tunisia near the border.
May 31	1	Refugee dies before reaching Malta.
June 2	272	Refugee immigrant boat sinks while it was trying to reach Italy.
June 2	1	One person killed by loyalists in Tripoli.
June 5	1	One person tortured and killed by rebels in Benghazi.
June 6	19	Mass suffocation of detainees by loyalists in Al-Khoms.
June 11–12	1	Zawiya raid
July 13 – August 22	1	Fourth Battle of Brega
July 25	11	NATO air-strike on Zliten.
July 30	3	NATO air-strike on Tripoli.
July 30	25	Refugees die of asphyxiation on a boat while trying to reach Italy.
August 3	3	Loyalist killings of civilians in Zawiya.
August 4	3	NATO air-strike on Zliten.
August 8	35–85	NATO air-strike on the village of Majer, near Zliten.
August 13–28	26	Rebel coastal offensive
August 19	27	NATO air-strike on Tripoli.
August 20–28	275	Battle of Tripoli
August 22	1	Loyalist shelling of Zliten.
August 23 – October 20	800-2,151	Second Gulf of Sidra offensive
September 4–18	20	Random rebel fire in Tripoli.
September 6 – October 6	12	Landmine explosions near Zliten.
September 8 – October 17	19–22	Battle of Bani Walid
September 30	4	Random rebel fire in Tripoli.
October 1	3	Rebel inter-factional fighting in the Nafusa mountains and Tripoli.
October 5	1	One person shot and killed by rebels in Tripoli.
October 12	1	One person tortured and killed by rebels in Taworgha.

There had been at least 5,637 to 7,046 reported civilians killed by October 23, 2011. However, a number of civilians were also killed during the Second Battle of Benghazi and during the campaign in the Nafusa mountains, so the number could be far higher. Also, the number of civilians killed in NATO air-strikes could be smaller than reported because it was proven that some of the previous government-announced tolls from individual strikes were exaggerated.

=== Overall deaths ===
In the end, according to the numbers presented, a total of 14,572 to 18,873 deaths have been reported, of which some have not been independently confirmed.

The opposition stated near the end of the war that 25,000 people had been killed and 4,000 had been reported as missing.

In January 2013, the new Libyan government, based on figures still being checked, estimated the number of killed to be actually far lower than previous estimates, with 4,700 of the dead being rebel fighters, a similar number loyalist soldiers and an undefined number civilians. An estimated 2,100 rebels and loyalists were missing.

Armed Conflict Location and Event Data Project, which compiles a database of all reported fatalities due to political violence on the African continent, listed 6,109 fatalities from 15 February to 23 October 2011, of which 1,319 prior to NATO intervention. Alan Kuperman, associate professor of Public Affairs at the University of Austin, calculated that about 1,000 Libyans, including civilians, rebels and soldiers, died between the start of the rebellion in mid-February and NATO intervention in mid-March.

The Uppsala Conflict Data Program, a public data resource that includes information on different types of organized violence (e.g. actors involved, casualties, date, location, etc.), reported that between 1,914 and 3,466 people were killed during the 2011 fighting. In addition their data shows that between 152 and 168 civilians were deliberately killed by the pro-Gaddafi forces in 2011.

A September 2015 study in the African Journal of Emergency Medicine found that 21,490 people were killed between February 2011 and February 2012 as a result of both direct (people killed in combat) and indirect deaths (damage to infrastructure and higher mortality rates).

== Deaths overall ==
The total number of people killed includes protesters, armed belligerents, and civilians:

Source	Libyan casualties	Time period
World Health Organization	2,000 killed	February 15 – March 2, 2011
International Federation for Human Rights	3,000 killed	February 15 – March 5, 2011
Libyan League for Human Rights	6,000 killed	February 15 – March 5, 2011
Alan Kuperman	1,000 killed	February 15 – March 15, 2011
National Transitional Council	10,000 killed	February 15 – April 12, 2011
UN Human Rights Council	10,000–15,000 killed	February 15 – June 9, 2011
Al Jazeera English	13,000 killed	February 15 – June 18, 2011
National Transitional Council	30,000 killed	February 15 – September 8, 2011
National Transitional Council	25,000 killed	February 15 – October 2, 2011
Zeidan Cabinet	9,400 killed	February 15 – October 23, 2011
ACLED	6,109 killed	February 15 – October 23, 2011
UCDP	2,082 killed	2011

== Notable deaths, disappearances and other cases ==
- Ali Hassan al-Jaber, Qatari journalist of Al Jazeera, killed
- Mohammed Nabbous, Libyan journalist and founder of Libya Alhurra TV, killed
- Kais al-Hilali, Libyan political cartoonist famous for painting anti-Gaddafi mural, killed
- Tim Hetherington, British-American photojournalist, killed
- Chris Hondros, American photojournalist, killed
- Ahmed Eyzert, engineer who discovered and masterminded the "invaluable" technique of using Google Earth satellite imagery with coordinates to enhance artillery accuracy, killed
- Saif al-Arab Gaddafi, son of Muammar Gaddafi, killed along with three of Gaddafi's grandchildren in a NATO air-strike
- Iman al-Obeidi, Libyan postgraduate law student, alleged rape case with media and governmental response
- Rana Akbani, Syrian journalist in government custody from March 28 to April 14
- Anton Hammerl, South African photographer, missing and presumed killed on April 5
- Manu Brabo, Spanish photographer in government custody from April 5 to May 18
- James Foley, American journalist in government custody from April 5 to May 18
- Clare Morgana Gillis, American journalist in government custody from April 5 to May 18
- Nigel Chandler, British journalist released from government custody on May 18
- Khamis Gaddafi, son of Muammar Gaddafi, killed when his vehicle was destroyed on August 29
- Muammar Gaddafi, Libyan leader from 1969–2011, killed in hometown of Sirte on October 20
- Mutassim Gaddafi, son of Muammar Gaddafi, killed alongside his father on October 20

== See also ==
Casualty recording
