= Brega (disambiguation) =

Brega may refer to:

- Brega (also Mersa Brega or Marsa al-Brega (Arabic: مرسى البريقة Marsā al Burayqah, "Brega Seaport")), an inhabited location in Libya
  - Marsa Brega Airport, the airport for Brega
- Brega, a petty kingdom north of Dublin in medieval Ireland

== People ==
- Kings of Brega, Irish kings ruling Mag Breg (the plain of Brega), north and west of modern Dublin
- Mario Brega (1923–1994), Italian actor
- Oleg Brega (born 1973), journalist, activist and filmmaker from Moldova
- Gheorghe Brega (born 1951), Moldovan politician
- Goran Bregović (born 1950), Bosnian musician nicknamed Brega

== Battles ==
=== World War II ===
- Battle of Brega (1941), part of the Western Desert Campaign of World War II

=== Libyan civil war ===
- First Battle of Brega, fought on March 2, 2011
- Second Battle of Brega, fought March 13 to 15, 2011
- Third Battle of Brega, fought March 31 to April 7, 2011
- Battle of Brega–Ajdabiya road, fought April 8, 2011 to July 14, 2011
- Fourth Battle of Brega, fought beginning July 14, 2011

== Music ==
- Brega (music), a style of Brazilian popular song
- Tecno brega, a form of music originating from Brazil

== Corporations ==
- Brega Marketing Company, a Libyan company for marketing oil
