= Battle of Kufra =

Battle of Kufra may refer to either of two battles fought for control of the Libyan desert town of Kufra:

- Battle of Kufra (1931), between Italian colonial troops and the Senussi
- Capture of Kufra, the World War II battle between an Anglo-French force and the Italians
- 2008 Kufra conflict, an armed conflict between the Libyan Government under Muammar Gaddafi and Toubou Front for the Salvation of Libya
- A battle in 2011 between pro- and anti-Gaddafi forces in the Libyan civil war, part of the Cyrenaican desert campaign
- 2012 Kufra conflict, armed clashes between the Toubou and Zuwayya tribes
