= Zawiya skirmish =

Armed engagement in Libya in 2011

Coordinates: 32°45′8″N 12°43′40″E

- Part of the Libyan Civil War
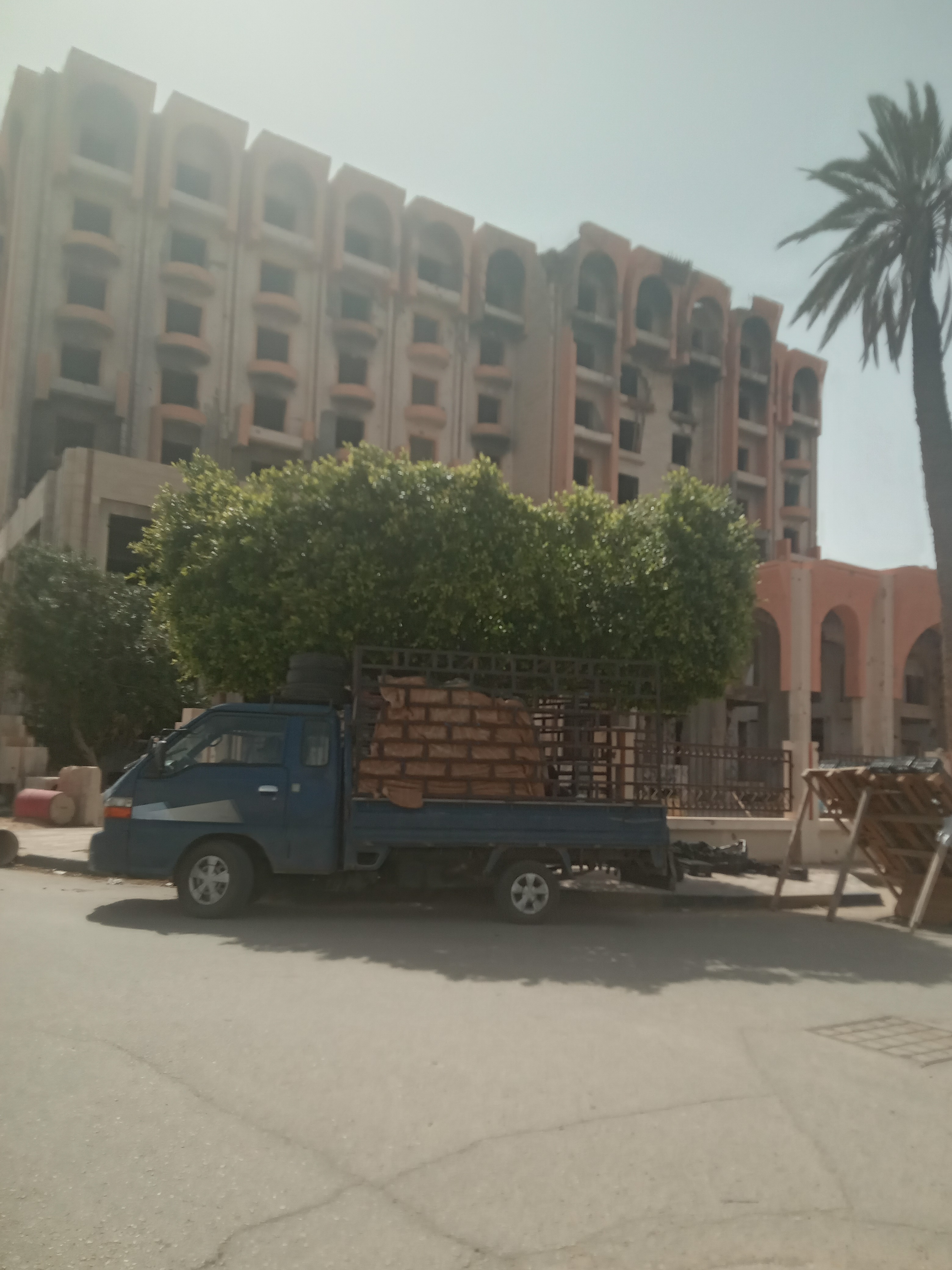
- Zawiya in 2025
| Date | 11 June – 12 June 2011 (1 day) |
| Location | Zawiya, Libya |
| Result | Pro-Gaddafi victory: Pro-Gaddafi forces repel rebel attack on the city |

Belligerents
| (Libya) Anti-Gaddafi forces: National Liberation Army | (Libya) Gaddafi Loyalists: Libyan Army; Paramilitary forces |

Commanders and leaders
| Unknown | (Libya) Mahdi al-Arabi |

Strength
| 100–200 fighters | Munawaba Brigade |

Casualties and losses
| 30 killed 20 wounded | 2–dozens* killed 17 captured |
- 1 civilian killed
- *Rebels claimed that up to 100 loyalist soldiers were killed, but no independent sources confirmed the claim

The Zawiya skirmish began on 11 June 2011, when the National Liberation Army launched an attack into the coastal city of Zawiya, Libya in an attempt to recapture it from army units and militiamen loyal to Muammar Gaddafi. The attack was quickly crushed by the numerically superior and better-equipped loyalist forces, who had taken the city earlier in the Libyan Civil War after defeating rebel forces in a major battle that lasted from February to March 2011.

== Combat ==
New clashes had restarted by early June, with an anti-Gaddafi uprising within the city. On 11 June, a spokesman for the rebel National Transitional Council said that the opposition fighters were in control of a large area on the western side of the city. Later the same day, Reuters confirmed that the coastal road was shut down and deserted, except for a large number of soldiers, police and armed men in civilian clothes. Residents also confirmed that fighting had begun during the morning between loyalist forces and rebels and described the fighting as "heavy".

According to a rebel spokesman within the city, 30 rebels were killed and 20 wounded in two days of fighting. The rebels managed to take control of the western side of the city, but the loyalists remained in control of the city center and eastern side. Also, there were reports that loyalist forces were receiving reinforcements. Guma el-Gamaty, United Kingdom–based coordinator for the National Transitional Council, claimed that rebel fighters in Zawiya consisted of fighters who had trained in the Nafusa Mountains. Moussa Ibrahim, a Libyan government spokesman, insisted that only 20 to 25 rebel guerrilla fighters had infiltrated the city and were being surrounded, and that they posed no threat to the regime.

By the evening of 12 June, a government spokesman announced that the rebels were defeated at Zawiya after hours of fighting. A group of foreign reporters were taken from Tripoli to Zawiya for confirmation of the loyalist victory. The reporters saw secure streets and confirmed that the pro-Gaddafi green flag was flying at the main square, where hours earlier rebels had claimed to have surrounded the loyalists and were attacking them from three sides. The government stated that the opposition forces had been pushed out of the city and surrounded on the edge of Zawiya. This was partially confirmed when a reporter heard several gunshots west of the city center, from which the rebels assaulted, and a rebel in the town stated that fighting was still taking place.

The rebels claimed that during the battle, a loyalist commander, the high-ranking el-Khouwildy el-Ahmeidy, was seriously wounded in a NATO air-strike while on his way to Zawiya.

On 13 June, contact with the rebel spokesman in the city, who was updating journalists on the situation, had ceased and the highway running through Zawiya toward the Tunisian border was re-opened. Foreign journalists were taken on a tour of the highway, confirming that traffic was no longer being re-routed around Zawiya, as was done at the beginning of the fighting.
