= Battle of Zawiya =

Battle of Zawiya may refer to:

- The First Battle of Zawiya, fought between pro- and anti-Gaddafi forces in the Libyan civil war from 24 February to 10 March 2011
- The Second Battle of Zawiya, fought between pro- and anti-Gaddafi forces in the Libyan civil war starting on 13 August 2011
