= Battle of Brega–Ajdabiya road =

Fought 8 April to 14 July 2011

- Part of the Libyan Civil War
Date	8 – 18 April 2011 (first phase); 19 April – 23 June 2011 (second phase); 24 June – 13 July 2011 (third phase)
Location	Brega–Ajdabiya, Libya
Result	Stalemate; Fourth Battle of Brega: Pro-Gaddafi forces entered Ajdabiya on 9 April, but rebel forces re-took the town by 11 April; Pro-Gaddafi forces repelled several rebel raids on Brega; Stagnant frontline formed between Brega and Ajdabiya on 18 April, scattered fighting continued for three months; Rebels started an all-out offensive to take Brega in July

Belligerents
(Libya) Anti-Gaddafi forces; National Liberation Army; Free Libyan Air Force; (United Nations) UNSC forces; NATO command	(Libya) Gaddafi Loyalists: Libyan Army; Paramilitary forces; support: Belarus (military advisers)

Commanders and leaders
(Libya) Abdul Fatah Younis (until 28 July) (Libya) Suleiman Mahmoud (Libya) Hamid Hassy	(Libya) Mutassim Gaddafi

Strength
5,000 (by 20 June)	1,500–3,000 (by 23 April); 3,000–7,000 (by late June/early July)

Casualties and losses
75–87 killed 4 missing 174–185 wounded 1 attack helicopter and 2 Chinook transport helicopters* shot down	94–95 killed, 59 captured 6–13 tanks destroyed in air-strikes (NATO claim; First phase) 78 technicals, 7 tanks and 6 armored vehicles destroyed in air-strikes (NATO claim; Third phase)
- 26-46 Libyan and 1 Algerian civilian killed, 70 Libyan civilians missing
- *No independent confirmation of the claim by the government to have shot down the two Chinooks, however, rebels confirmed the previous day that they had sent two helicopters into battle

The Battle of Brega–Ajdabiya road was a battle during the Libyan Civil War between forces loyal to Libyan leader Muammar Gaddafi and anti-Gaddafi forces for control of the towns of Brega and Ajdabiya respectively and the Libyan Coastal Highway between them.

This theater of the war saw a stagnant front forming quickly. By late June neither the loyalists or rebels were able to advance, and were thus holding firm on their respective sides of the frontline. In an effort to break the deadlock, NATO's air force began an intensified bombing campaign of government military positions; by mid-July, however, the situation remained essentially unchanged.

Eventually, on 14 July 2011, the rebels started an all-out offensive in an attempt to break the stalemate. However, their attack was repelled and the deadlock continued.

== Background ==
On 30 March, following a government counter-offensive, loyalist forces took control of the town of Brega, just west of Ajdabiya. Rebels attempted a counter-attack to take back the town. For eight days, loyalists and rebels battled for control of Brega. In the end, government troops repelled numerous rebel attacks on the city and managed to push the rebels back to Ajdabiya by 7 April, exploiting panic amongst the rebels created by a NATO air-strike on a column of rebel tanks to gain the initiative. Following the rebel retreat, government troops consolidated full control over Brega and were preparing a raid against Ajdabiya.

== Battle ==
=== Shelling of Ajdabiya starts ===
By 8 April, most civilians had left Ajdabiya, but rebels regrouped in the city which was still in rebel hands, after their forces fled in panic to several different directions near Ajdabiya following a swift government push down the road from Brega using artillery the previous day. During the day, the rebels sent out a scouting party to verify government troop positions which caused a firefight in which 6 rebels were wounded before they pulled back to Ajdabiya. Later, the loyalists hit the main rebel checkpoint at the western gate of the town with mortar fire which caused the opposition forces to retreat from the gate to the city center, 7 kilometres (4.3 mi) away. By evening, pro-Gaddafi forces were 18–19 kilometres (11–12 mi) from Ajdabiya and once again at its gates, less than two weeks after previously retreating from the town. The British MoD claimed to have destroyed two loyalist tanks in air-strikes during the day near the city.

=== Loyalist troops surge into Ajdabiya ===
On 9 April, rebel forces attempted to go back to Brega but only got to the university before having to pull back due to intense shelling. After the rebel retreat, loyalist artillery shelled Ajdabiya, most notably the city's western gate for 30 minutes. Pro-Gaddafi forces had attacked the city from the north, west and south. They had moved through the southern desert overnight to within striking distance of the city. The bombardment killed three rebels before it dropped off after what appeared to be a NATO air-strike. Later, however, NATO stated they had not conducted any air-strikes in the vicinity of Ajdabiya during the day. Following the alleged air-strike, government troops pushed into Ajdabiya and spread out across the city, avoiding NATO planes and making it impossible for the pilots to know whom to hit. Three hours of heavy street fighting started and eventually the rebels were pushed out to the city's outskirts and appeared to have all but lost the town once again. The fighting at one point came dangerously close to the city's hospital with gunfire being heard several streets away and shells landing nearby. The rebels stated that government forces were aided by sympathizers within Ajdabiya. During the day, a rebel Hind attack helicopter was spotted flying over the city, in defiance of the UN no-fly zone. It was later confirmed to have been shot down by government forces. At sunset, some rebel reinforcements reached the town. The rebels started re-entering the town via the eastern entrance and claimed to be re-establishing control. Smaller loyalist units were still roaming the western parts of the city and government troops were in firm control of the city's western gate. As night fell, the fighting started up again with street battles raging for control of the city's main street, Istanbul Street. According to Al Jazeera, loyalists were reported to be in control of the western part of the town while the rebels were in the city center. There were also reports of fighting for the southern part of the town, while rebels were holding their positions in the northern and eastern part.

=== Continued loyalist push and NATO attacks ===
On 10 April, street fighting continued with loyalist forces managing to push closer to the city center and finally reaching the heart of the town in the afternoon. The government claimed that loyalist forces had shot down two rebel Chinook helicopters who were in violation of the UN resolution 1973 relating to the no-fly zone. There was no independent confirmation of the claim. However, a rebel spokesman confirmed the previous day that the rebels had sent two helicopters from Tobruk to assist in the battle for the city. NATO claimed to have hit 11 tanks in the early part of the day outside Ajdabiya. A Reuters correspondent saw 15 charred corpses of Gaddafi's forces near six destroyed armored vehicles. Later, the rebels claimed, and evidently Al Jazeera confirmed, that the NATO attacks helped them push out the loyalists from the city. However, by the evening, shelling from the west of the town was still being heard.

On 11 April, Al Jazeera and other media reported that loyalist forces had pulled out of the city. However, there was still fighting just to the west of the city with three more rebels being killed during the evening by loyalist rocket fire.

=== Artillery duels ===
On 12 April, Gaddafi forces bombarded the western gate of Ajdabiya with artillery.

On 13 April, the rebels said they were exchanging rocket fire with the loyalists who were firing from the front about 40 kilometres (25 mi) east of Brega. Sometime on the next day, the front, about 50 kilometres (31 mi) west of Ajdabiya, came under heavy mortar and rocket fire from loyalist forces. The rebels responded by sending a convoy of some 100 vehicles to the front. At least two rebels were reported killed during the fighting.

On 15 April, AP and CNN reported that a rebel column tried to advance on Brega from Ajdabiya following a rocket barrage. They advanced to positions previously confirmed to be held by loyalists but found no trace of them. However, later CNN confirmed that the rebel advance turned into a rout with opposition forces retreating to Ajdabiya's western gate after loyalist troops were spotted holding positions just north of the Ajdabiya-Brega road on their flank. During the attempted advance, a rebel fighter was killed and two others wounded after a hit-and-run attack from Gaddafi's troops 1 kilometre (0.62 mi) outside the western gate of Ajdabiya.

=== New rebel attack against Brega ===
Sometime after midnight on 16 April, the top rebel commander Abdul Fatah Younis claimed that the rebels managed to reach Brega and were engaged in a fierce battle for the town and would capture it by morning. It was not immediately possible to independently verify the claim. However, by mid-afternoon, it was confirmed that the rebels launched an offensive against Brega. Their first objective was the university campus that was about 5 kilometres (3.1 mi) from the eastern entrance into the town and an outer line of defence by government troops.

During their advance, the rebels were hit hard at a refueling point, midway between Brega and Ajdabiya, by rocket or artillery fire causing a number of casualties. Still, the rebels continued to advance and made an attempt to storm the university complex. However, their attack was repelled by heavy artillery and they did not manage to enter the town itself. During the first day of fighting, eight rebels were killed, four were missing and 27 were wounded.

The rebels had hoped that if they manage to re-capture the town they could bring up engineers to repair the oil terminals in Brega so they can make use of them.

=== Loyalist flanking attack against Ajdabiya ===
On the morning of 17 April, Gaddafi forces were shelling the western gate of Ajdabiya and some ground fighting occurred when they outflanked the main fighting group on the edge of Brega from the south. Rebel commander Abdul Fatah Younis confirmed that his troops had pulled back under a massive attack of Gaddafi troops and asked for more air-strikes. However, Al Jazeera reported continued fighting in the afternoon at Brega, after Younis had announced the rebel retreat. According to Younis, NATO had assured the rebels that they took out all the heavy artillery in Brega, but they never really did. After a few hours of skirmishes, loyalist forward units that were engaging rebels on the western outskirts of Ajdabiya pulled back. In the afternoon more than 30 vehicles of rebel reinforcements arrived into the town and the rebels positioned themselves in anticipation of a possible direct attack on the city, specifically from the south via the road from Jalu. In the evening, the rebels were unsure of where loyalist forces were positioned in the vicinity of Ajdabiya or about the situation on the outskirts of Brega.

=== Stalemate ===
On 18 April, rebels moved out 40 kilometres (25 miles) west from Ajdabiya to midway between it and Brega in response to "clear skies". For the next three weeks, except for a few artillery skirmishes and an occasional NATO air-strike, the rebels and Gaddafi's forces had not confronted each other at all in the Brega-Ajdabiya area.

On 23 April, rebels claimed that air-strikes on Gaddafi's forces located on the Al Zaitoniya – Al Soihat road near Ajdabiya reportedly hit 21 army vehicles belonging to Gaddafi's forces. However, there was no independent or NATO confirmation of the claim. On the same day, loyalist forces also shelled the small village of al-Faluja, near Ajdabiya.

Al Jazeera reported on 24 April, that loyalists had firmly established themselves in a residential area in Brega with around eight Grad batteries and a large number of troops. It was also reported that NATO had attacked pro-Gaddafi forces in Mareer Qabes, an area northwest of Ajdabiya; loyalists had apparently been trying to skirt the city and secretly surround it.

On 26 April, a rebel told Reuters that Gaddafi forces were digging in around Brega to reinforce their positions. He estimated their number at around 3,000 and confirmed that the frontline was midway on the road between Ajdabiya and Brega.

On 6 May, a rebel scouting pick-up came too close to loyalist lines and was hit by artillery fire. Three rebels were killed.

On 9 May, the rebels claimed that they killed 36 soldiers from Gaddafi's forces and lost six of their fighters in a battle between Brega and Ajdabiya. The figures given for the loyalist dead could not be verified independently.

Two days later, a small loyalist raiding party attacked rebel positions 6 kilometres (3.7 mi) from Ajdabiya, killing one and wounding two others. According to the head of the local ambulance service and several residents, loyalists launched three rockets from an undetermined location into an Ajdabiya neighbourhood on the morning of 12 May, striking a house, rubbish heap, and several cars. No casualties were reported.

On 13 May, the Libyan government stated that 18 civilians were killed, including 11 imams, and 50 wounded in a NATO air-strike on a guest house in Brega where the clerics were staying after holding a ceremony in the frontline town. NATO claimed that what their strike hit was a military command-and-control point. According to Al Jazeera, a Dutch engineer reported that he had built a command bunker for Gaddafi in 1988, at the same coordinates the NATO strike occurred. He stated that the bunker was designed to withstand an atomic strike. Neither claim regarding the casualties has been independently confirmed thus far.

On 19 May, increased rebel activity was reported between Ajdabiya and Brega. New recruits and ammunition arrived in large numbers at the front lines.

On 20 May, a relatively small band of rebel fighters launched an attack which included limited artillery fire at Gaddafi's forces at Brega University, an area in which rebels had trouble engaging in before due to Gaddafi's forces extensive use of artillery shelling. Rebels managed to position themselves past the university to attack it from multiple angles, but Gaddafi's forces were still holding their positions at the university by the end of the day.

On 21 May, rebels launched an attack on Brega from six directions in an attempt to outflank loyalists entrenched there. Two rebels were killed and 12 were wounded, along with an unknown number of loyalists, according to a field surgeon. The surgeon claimed that the rebels destroyed two loyalist vehicles mounted with heavy weapons and captured another three. Later during the evening, loyalists counter-attacked with one rebel killed and four wounded in fighting at the Arbaein checkpoint on the midpoint between Brega and Ajdabiya.

On 4 June, NATO launched its first helicopter attack on targets in and near Brega. One radar installation and one pick-up, mounted with an anti-aircraft gun, at a military checkpoint were destroyed.

On 11 June, NATO reported that surveillance from overhead fighter jets found that Gaddafi's forces dug a wide trench near the frontline of Brega and filled it with a black liquid believed to be petroleum or oil.

On 12 June, soon after anti-Gaddafi uprisings in Zliten and Zawiya, rebels launched an attack on Brega. A force of 130 rebels attempted to advance on Brega but were repelled and pulled back to Ajdabiya. Four of the opposition fighters were killed and 65 wounded during the offensive.

On the morning of the next day, 13 June, another rebel push was attempted against Brega and this one too was repulsed with even heavier casualties than the previous attack. 23–25 rebels were killed and 26 wounded. The rebels were advancing when they were ambushed by loyalist forces some 35 kilometres (22 mi) east of Brega. The loyalists were pretending to surrender, showing a white flag, when they opened fire on the rebels.

On 14 June, rebels attacked Brega once again with infantry, IFVs and technicals marking the third day of their offensive.

On 17 June, a NATO air-strike destroyed six rebel pick-up trucks, mounted with anti-aircraft guns, near Ajdabiya, wounding 16 rebels.

=== Intensified NATO Campaign ===
On 24 June, NATO started launching massive air-strikes on Brega. According to their own reports, they claimed to have destroyed 146 military targets in three weeks. However, there was no independent confirmation of the destruction of the targets. The Libyan government claimed that 20 civilians were killed during the first day of attacks.

24 June-to-13 July NATO Strikes
Date	Technicals	Trucks	Tanks	Armored vehicles	Buildings/Equipment
24 June	14 Truck-Mounted Guns	3 Logistic Trucks	1 Tank	2 Armoured Personnel Carriers	7 Command and Control Nodes, 1 Military Storage Facility, 7 Shelters
25 June	6 Technicals	1 Logistic Truck	2 Tanks	0	3 Military Shelters, 4 Military Compounds, 1 Antenna
28 June	12 Armed Vehicles, 5 Technicals	3 Trucks	0	1 Armored Vehicle	2 Command and Control Nodes, 1 Command and Control Facility, 1 Artillery Piece, 3 Military Hangars
29 June	12 Military Vehicles	1 Truck	0	1 Armoured Personnel Carrier	1 Ammunition Storage, 1 Military Compound, 1 Military Checkpoint
30 June	0	0	0	0	2 Command and Control Facilities
3 July	13 Armed Vehicles	0	1 Tank	0	2 Command and Control Nodes, 2 Military Storage Facilities, 1 Artillery Piece
4 July	0	0	0	0	1 Military Storage Facility
5 July	0	0	0	0	1 Command and Control Center
6 July	8 Armed Vehicles	1 Truck	0	2 Armoured Fighting Vehicles	1 Military Refuelling Equipment
7 July	0	0	0	0	1 Military Refuelling Equipment
8 July	0	0	1 Tank	0	0
9 July	1 Armed Vehicle	0	1 Tank	0	0
10 July	3 Armed Vehicles	0	0	0	0
12 July	0	0	0	0	1 Military Storage Facility
13 July	4 Armed Vehicles	0	1 Tank	0	1 Command and Control Node
Total	78	9	7	6	46

=== New rebel offensive ===
On 9 July, government troops destroyed the petro-chemical plant in Brega, according to a Libyan rebel's spokesman.

On 14 July, the rebels attacked Brega once again, this time armed with refurbished and repaired T-72 tanks and armoured personnel carriers as well some armed technical trucks. By the next day, the rebels themselves confirmed that their attack had failed and that they had fallen back to their previous positions where battles with loyalist forces continued on three fronts. Late on the second day of the fighting, rebel forces on a recon mission breached Brega, but pulled back to prepare for a fresh offensive the next day.

On 16 July, according to some reports, rebel forces managed to enter Brega's outskirts but encountered heavy government shelling and multiple land mines. They were moving slowly because of hundreds of land mines. They were also slowed due to defensive trenches around the city that had been filled with flammable chemicals by retreating loyalist troops. Government troops had mostly pulled back into the town from its outskirts and left the booby-trapped trenches behind. Most opposition troops were reportedly still 20 kilometres (12 mi) east of Brega by the end of the third day.

On 17 July, heavy street-to-street fighting in residential areas of Brega started.

On 18 July, rebels announced that the main bulk of loyalist forces had retreated to Ra's Lanuf while the main group of rebel forces were already behind Brega and were heading towards Bashr and Ugayla. The rest of rebel forces started cleaning up mines and pockets of loyalists in Brega.

On 19 July, following a fierce loyalist counter-attack that left 110 rebels dead or wounded, opposition forces withdrew east from Brega.

By the end of July, the city was still in control of the Gaddafi army and the rebels effort to take Brega had stalled. They were reported to be 20 kilometres (12 miles) away from Brega and the battle was back to the Brega-Ajdabiya road.

On 31 July, rebels said that they were planning a new offensive on Brega, which was still held and defended by 3,000 well-armed loyalists.

On 5 August, the rebels claimed to have captured a hill overlooking part of the town.

On 9 August, the rebels launched a second attempt to take the town. According to rebel commander Faraj Moftah, rebel fighters were able to penetrate the residential area once again. By the evening of 11 August, a National Liberation Army spokesman in Benghazi announced that the New Brega residential district was captured. A few hours later, in a telephone call with the Associated Press correspondent, rebel commander Mohammed al-Rijali announced from Ajdabiya that Brega had fallen under opposition control. These claims could not be immediately verified.

== See also ==
- Operation Crusader#Aftermath and
- El Agheila#World War II, for similar stalemates in the same region during much of 1941–1942
