= Hussein Darbouk =

- Born: Libya
- Died: 4 March 2011 Zawiya, Libya
- Allegiance: Libyan Arab Jamahiriya (until 2011); Libyan National Transitional Council (2011)
- Branch: (History of Libya under Muammar Gaddafi) Libyan Army (until 2011) (Libya) National Liberation Army (2011)
- Rank: Colonel
- Conflicts: First Libyan Civil War; First Battle of Zawiya †

Hussein Darbouk was a Libyan military officer and rebel figure during the First Libyan Civil War. He defected to the anti-Gaddafi rebel forces during the first phases of the civil war, and commanded the rebel forces in the First Battle of Zawiya against Gaddafi's forces.

On 4 March, Alaa al-Zawi, an activist in the city of Zawiya announced that the commander of the rebel forces in the city — Hussein Darbouk — was killed in action from an anti-aircraft gun as the Libyan Army's Khamis Brigade bombarded the city's western edges with mortars, heavy machine guns, tanks and anti-aircraft guns, fighting armed residents and defected military units.
