= SS Rosanna =

History
- Launched: 1937
- Fate: Scuttled 1941

General characteristics
- Tonnage: 205 GRT

Italian motor merchant SS Rosanna, built in 1937, in Zaandam, in the Netherlands. Scuttled on 9 February 1941, in the Gulf of Sidra by Italians to avoid capture by British troops.
