= Muftah Anaqrat =

Libyan general

Personal details
- Died: 9 March 2011 Zawiya, Libya

Military service
- Allegiance: (Libya) Libyan Arab Jamahiriya
- Branch/service: Libyan Army
- Years of service: 2011
- Rank: Brigadier General
- Commands: Zawiya
- Battles/wars: 2011 Libyan civil war: First Battle of Zawiya †

Muftah Anaqrat (Arabic: مفتاح أنقارات) was a general of the Libyan Armed Forces under former Libyan leader Muammar Gaddafi, during the 2011 Libyan civil war, before their defeat and Gaddafi's death in Sirte. Anaqrat was killed in the First Battle of Zawiya in March 2011 as Gaddafi loyalists retook the city. It was claimed that a colonel, Mohamed Gayth, was killed alongside him.
