= Mohamed Gayth =

Libyan colonel

Personal details
- Died: 9 March 2011 Zawiya, Libya

Military service
- Allegiance: (Libya) Libyan Arab Jamahiriya
- Branch/service: Libyan Army
- Years of service: 2011
- Rank: Colonel
- Commands: Zawiya
- Battles/wars: 2011 Libyan civil war: First Battle of Zawiya †

Mohamed Gayth (Arabic: محمد غيث) was a colonel in the Libyan Armed Forces loyal to the former Libyan leader Muammar Gaddafi, during the 2011 Libyan civil war, before their defeat and Gaddafi's death in Sirte. Gayth was reported to be killed in the First Battle of Zawiya in March 2011 as pro-Gaddafi forces took the city. It was claimed that a Brigadier-general of Libyan Army, Muftah Anaqrat, was killed alongside him.
