= Conde Só Brega =

- Birth name: Ivanildo Marques da Silva
- Born: November 15, 1954 (age 70); Recife, Pernambuco, Brazil
- Genres: brega
- Occupations: Singer songwriter
- Instruments: voice
- Years active: 1990–2000 – present
- Labels: Somax Estúdios, INC – presente

Ivanildo Marques da Silva (Recife, November 15, 1954), better known by his stage name Conde Só Brega or Conde, is a Brazilian singer and songwriter.

The artist is known for being the lead singer of the band O Conde & Banda Só Brega, which released hits of brega music in Pernambuco between the 1990s and 2000s.

== Discography ==
=== Studio albums ===
- 20 Super Sucessos: Banda Só Brega (Somax Estúdios, INC): 2014
