= 2011 Libyan rebel coastal offensive =

Military campaign during the Libyan civil war

- Part of the First Libyan Civil War
Date	13 – 28 August 2011
Location	Western Libyan coast, Libya
Result	Rebel victory
Territorial changes	Rebels capture Sorman, Sabratha, Ajaylat, Zuwara, 'Aziziya, Tripoli, Ras Ajdir and Zawiya.

Belligerents
(Libya) Anti-Gaddafi forces; National Liberation Army; Free Libyan Air Force; NATO (per UNSC 1973)	(Libya) Gaddafi Loyalists; Libyan Army; Libyan Navy; Paramilitary forces; Foreign mercenaries

Commanders and leaders
(Libya) Ismail al-Sallabi (Zawiya area) (Libya) Omar Obeid (Sabratha area) (Libya) Senussi Mohamed (Sabratha area)	(Libya) Mahdi al-Arabi (surrendered) (Zawiya area)

Casualties and losses
95 killed 109 wounded 1 tank destroyed	95 killed 150 wounded 15 captured NATO claim: 11 tanks destroyed 1 armoured vehicle destroyed 5 technicals destroyed 1 military boat destroyed
- 26 civilians killed

The 2011 Libyan rebel coastal offensive was a major rebel offensive of the Libyan Civil War. It was mounted by anti-Gaddafi forces with the intention of cutting off the supply route from Tunisia for pro-Gaddafi loyalist forces in Tripoli.

== Background ==
The offensive was launched by opposition forces based in Nafusa Mountains who had managed to make a breakthrough in loyalist lines around the mountains just a few days earlier. The loyalists and rebels had been fighting for the mountain chain for over five months, often in back-and-forth battles. However, due to an intense NATO bombing campaign of loyalist forces, pro-Gaddafi troops had to pull back from the mountains. This gave the rebels a chance to go on the offensive toward the coast west of Tripoli.

== Offensive ==
Held by anti-Gaddafi protesters by 1 March. (Checkered: Maximum Loyalists gains, April–May.) Rebel advances by 1 August. Rebel gains after the western coastal offensive in August. Last loyalist pockets.

The offensive started on 13 August 2011 with rebels advancing toward the oil refinery town of Zawiya supported by NATO air-strikes. The town revolted against Gaddafi governmental control in late February but the revolt was crushed by pro-Gaddafi forces in early March. There was a rebel raid against the city in June that was defeated by government troops. Holding Zawiya was a priority for the pro-Gaddafi forces, as the city lies on their coastal supply route and is a vital control city on the route from Tripoli to Tunisia. It is home to an important oil refinery, the only one in loyalist hands prior to the battle.

During the attack, the rebels first advanced to a bridge on the southwestern outskirts before being hit by loyalist artillery fire. One group of rebels fought through loyalist defensive lines in the western sector of the town, overrunning it, and pushed into the city center. At the same time rebels entering the city were cheered by some residents, who came out of their homes to greet them shouting "God is great". Some joined the rebels as fighters. After the rebels reached the main square loyalist forces from the eastern part of Zawiya counter-attacked with a barrage of heavy weapons.

By the evening, the Libyan government stated that a rebel force entered the city on a "suicide mission" but failed to take control of the town and that Zawiya was "totally" under government control. A rebel commander stated that opposition forces were almost 1 kilometre (0.62 miles) south of the city center on the western side of the main road, while loyalist troops were on the east side.

During the night, reports surfaced of a rebel attempt at taking the border crossing of Ras Ajdir. Tunisian border guards stated that the loyalists brought up heavy weapons, including tanks, to defend it. By the next day it was reported that the rebel attack had been unsuccessful.

On 14 August, fighting was still ongoing and the rebels had not taken the center of Zawiya. A rebel commander stated that they controlled the western and southern gate of Zawiya, after managing to push 3 kilometres (1.9 miles) into the city, while government forces were controlling the east and the center of the town. Later during the day, Al Jazeera English stated that the rebels had taken control of a key highway running through Zawiya, the one that links Tunisia to Tripoli.

The same day rebels claimed that they captured the neighboring city of Sorman, just west of Zawiya, and that they suffered ten dead and 34 wounded in fighting there. Clashes were also claimed to be occurring in nearby Sabratha. Later, a rebel spokesman also announced the capture of Ajaylat.

On 15 August, loyalist forces pushed back the rebels from the city center of Zawiya in a concentrated effort to block the rebel advance. However, by the evening, rebels claimed to hold 80 percent of Zawiya. They also arrested 15 people they said were African mercenaries and Libyan Army soldiers, though at least one alleged mercenary claimed he was an innocent Nigerian guest worker. Some fighters said they expected it would take some time to clear all the snipers from tall buildings inside the city. Some shelling continued, though rebel soldiers said fighting was getting closer to the loyalist-held oil facility.

Al Jazeera reported the fall of Sabratha to rebel forces, with the exception of an army base west of the city, which had been besieged. As of 15 August, rebel forces stated that they were negotiating surrender terms with the remaining loyalist forces in Sabratha.

On 16 August, government spokesman Moussa Ibrahim claimed that loyalist forces had retaken Sorman, confirming accounts that Sorman had earlier been captured by rebel forces. He also claimed that Gaddafi governmental forces were in full control of Zawiya, and that "they will soon retake Gharyan". NATO Colonel Roland Lavoie said on 16 August that "there is still some fighting reported" in the suburbs of Sorman, though he did not say who NATO believed was in control of the city proper. An eyewitness report by journalist Ann Marlowe confirmed that Sorman had been taken several days earlier, and confirmed that Sabratha had been taken by rebels on 15 August, after loyalist forces fled. However, the very next day, heavy fighting was reported to be still ongoing in Sabratha.

On 18 August, rebels declared that after a four-day battle they had secured the city of Sabratha and defeated loyalist forces and were in control of 90 percent of the city, including the centre, after having overrun it with at least 200 fighters. The loyalists were defeated after NATO bombed a loyalist military base in the city allowing the rebels to storm the base and seize weapons left behind by Gaddafi's men. This victory was confirmed by a team of Reuters reporters, who witnessed the rebel fighters in control of the city center.

A rebel commander claimed that Zuwara was in rebel hands on 18 August, according to the AP news agency.

On 19 August, a Guardian reporter confirmed the end of fighting in Sabratha; according to him, the fighting there lasted three days, ending on 16 August. He also confirmed that the ancient Roman amphitheater ruins survived the fighting. Rebel fighters also told The Guardian that they are planning to move towards Zuwara.

On 22 August, rebels claimed the capture of Zuwara and the Ras Ajdir border crossing.

On 23 August, a Tagesschau correspondent confirmed that city of 'Aziziya was under rebel control.

On 24 August, loyalist forces attempted to retake the rebel-held city of Ajaylat, mounting an attack with tanks and missiles. They also shelled the rebel-held city of Zuwara.

On 27 August, a ship carrying ammunition for the Libyan rebels fighting for control of the coastal road, west of Tripoli to the Tunisian border, blew up on Saturday at the port of Zuwara.

On 28 August, an Al Jazeera English correspondent reported that a region near Ajaylat was controlled by a "small pocket" of pro-Gaddafi forces, but that supply lines safely bypassed the town.

== Rebel advance on Tripoli ==
On 20 August rebels stated that the end of Gaddafi was "very near". The same day rebels within Tripoli started the battle of Tripoli; the main rebel forces were still 27 kilometres (17 miles) outside of Tripoli.

On 21 August, rebel forces pushed towards Tripoli from two fronts in order to help a local uprising in the city itself. From Zawiya they advanced to village Al Maya, 17 kilometres (11 miles) east from Zawiya while other units were preparing to attack 'Aziziya, the last major city between rebel-controlled Gharyan and Tripoli. After taking the village of Joudaim, east of Zawiya, and advancing to the village of Al Maya, the rebels were stopped by loyalist forces who pounded them with artillery, rocket and anti-aircraft fire. The rebels captured a military barracks, which housed the elite Khamis Brigade, 27 kilometres (17 miles) west of Tripoli, as well as weapons and ammo left behind by retreating loyalists.

By the night of 21 August, rebels had pushed into Tripoli, meeting little resistance from government forces. Martyrs' Square was taken that night, while cheering residents filled the streets.

== NATO strikes ==
According to NATO's daily "Operational Media Updates", the NATO strikes, during the offensive, hit:

13 August-to-23 August NATO Strikes
Date	Anti Aircraft Guns	Tanks	Vehicles	Other
13 August	0	1 Tank	0	0
14 August	1 Anti Aircraft Gun	0	0	0
15 August	0	3 Tanks	1 Armored vehicle, 1 Technical	0
17 August	0	0	2 Technicals	1 Military boat
18 August	0	5 Tanks	2 Technicals	1 Command and Control Node
19 August	0	0	0	1 Artillery Piece
23 August	0	2 Tanks	3 Armed Vehicles, 2 Military Trucks	1 Military Facility
Total	1	11	11	4

== Influences on other fronts ==
On 15 August, following rebel successes in the battlefield, the Libyan Interior minister Nassr al-Mabrouk Abdullah defected to Egypt with nine members of his family, although airport officials said he was just visiting as a tourist. The Gaddafi government claimed to have no knowledge of his leaving the country.

On 15 August, apparently in response to rebel battlefield successes, a Scud missile was fired from the Gaddafi stronghold of Sirte at rebel-controlled territory. It is believed that the missile was intended to hit rebel troop formations around Brega; instead, it overshot the target by 80.5 kilometres (50.0 mi) and landed harmlessly in the desert.

On 18 August, US officials reported that Muammar Gaddafi was making preparations to flee to exile in Tunisia with his family.

On 19 August, rebels stated that Abdel Sallam Jalloud, who was once Gaddafi's closest adviser, had defected to them, displaying pictures of him in the rebel-held city of Zintan as proof. The next day, Tunisian officials reported that Jalloud had actually fled to Italy, via Tunisia.

On 20 August, Tunisian sources stated that Libyan oil minister Omran Abukraa had defected to Tunisia.
