= Kufra conflict =

Kufra conflict may refer to:

- Battle of Kufra (1941)
- 2008 Kufra conflict
- 2012 Kufra conflict
