= Mahdi al-Arabi =

Libyan brigadier-general

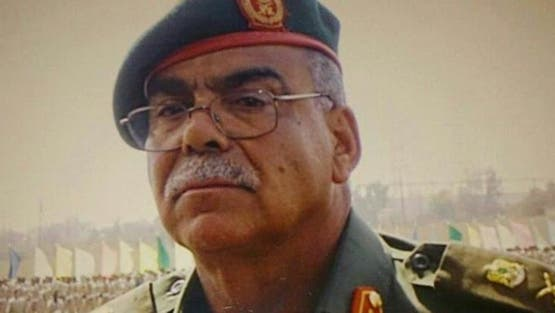
- Born: c. 1940's Zawiya, Libya
- Military career
- Allegiance: (Libya) Libyan Arab Jamahiriya
- Branch: Libyan Army
- Service years: 1967 –2011
- Rank: Brigadier-General
- Commands: Deputy Chief of Staff of the Libyan Army
- Conflicts: 2011 Libyan civil war; 2011 Libyan rebel coastal offensive; Chadian–Libyan War; First Battle of Zawiya; Second Battle of Zawiya

Mahdi al-Arabi (Arabic: مهدي العربي) is a Libyan brigadier-general who served under the Libyan Armed Forces loyal to Muammar Gaddafi. He was the deputy chief of staff of the Libyan Army. During the 2011 Libyan civil war, he was put in charge of helping to suppress protests, most notably in the Libyan city of Zawiya.

On 21 August 2011, anti-Gaddafi forces reportedly arrested Al-Arabi in Tripoli, after some spies disclosed his location and the location of other generals. A video purportedly of Arabi in detention was posted to YouTube on 11 September.
