= Hamid Hassy =

Libyan colonel

Hamid Hassy was an anti-Gaddafi fighter, a Colonel in the National Liberation Army (NLA), and a field commander in the Libyan Civil War. He took part in the Battle of Brega-Ajdabiya, Fourth Battle of Brega, and Battle of Sirte (2011).
