= Ann Marlowe =

American critic, journalist and writer

- Born: Suffern, New York, U.S.
- Occupations: Writer, journalist, critic
- Writing career
- Genre: Non-fiction

Ann Rachel Marlowe (born 1958) is an American critic, journalist and writer working in New York City.

== Early years and education ==
Ann Rachel Marlowe was born in Suffern, New York. In 1979, Marlowe received her B.A. in philosophy magna cum laude from Harvard University. From 1979 to 1980, she was Ph.D. student in the classical philosophy program at Harvard. Four years later, in 1984, she graduated with an MBA in finance from Columbia University.

== Career ==
Marlowe published rock criticism in the early to mid-1990s in the Village Voice, LA Weekly, Artforum, and Spin. Her writing was influenced by the example of Greil Marcus in seeking a broader cultural context and often a political meaning for the bands she reviewed.

Marlowe's first memoir, How To Stop Time: Heroin from A to Z, was widely reviewed and discussed in many online groups of drug users or recovering addicts. She contributes frequently to the op-ed pages of The Wall Street Journal and New York Post, mainly writing about Afghanistan and the US counterinsurgency there. She is one of 220 contributors of entries to A New Literary History of America (Harvard University Press, 2009), edited by Greil Marcus and Werner Sollors. Her entry explores the cultural significance of Linda Lovelace's 1980 memoir, Ordeal.

Marlowe has also worked as a legal recruiter specializing in placing tax and pension lawyers since 1987, first for A-L Legal Search and since 1990 for herself.

=== Afghanistan ===
After 9/11, Marlowe began to write about Afghanistan and terrorism, making frequent trips to Afghanistan and learning Dari. The LA Weekly featured Marlowe as a blogger writing in Afghanistan in a feature entitled Ann Marlowe in Afghanistan. She also dated an Afghan-American man, an experience described in her second memoir, The Book Of Trouble: A Romance.

Marlowe's writings on Afghanistan have often challenged mainstream opinion, including arguing that "Afghanistan Doesn't Need a 'Surge'." She has drawn attention to Afghanistan's robust private sector and rapid economic growth in op-eds for The Wall Street Journal, commented on Kabul's vibrant expat social scene, and criticized Afghan President Hamid Karzai frequently for Taliban sympathies, incompetence and toleration of corruption in the many pieces in The Wall Street Journal, New York Post and a 2008 op-ed in The Washington Post. Marlowe has also consistently argued that the US military is pursuing sensible policies in the country. Marlowe has been a frequent guest of conservative radio host John Batchelor speaking on Afghanistan.

=== Libya ===
During the 2011 Libyan civil war, Marlowe worked as a journalist in Libya attached to rebel forces.

== Critical reception ==
Upon the release of How to Stop Time, many praised its unsparing view of addiction as fundamentally a choice, but others charged that Marlowe could not have come to this conclusion if she were a "real addict" (IV user, poor, uneducated). She was condemned as a dilettante and attacked for glamorizing drug use by some reviewers, but most agreed that the book was well written and original.

The Book of Trouble received far less critical attention than her heroin book and although it was translated into Portuguese and Dutch, it never appeared in paperback. Many reviewers could not understand her preoccupation with a man they viewed as a "jerk" and found the book less well structured than How To Stop Time.

How to Stop Time was chosen one of the top 25 books of 1999 by the Village Voice.

== List of works ==
=== Monographs ===
- David Galula: His Life and Intellectual Context, Strategic Studies Institute, US Army War College, 27 August 2010.

=== Books ===
- How To Stop Time: Heroin from A to Z (2000)
- The Book Of Trouble: A Romance (2006)

=== Books featuring works by Ann Marlowe ===
- Rap on Rap: Straight-Up Talk on Hiphop Culture (1995) edited by Adam Sexton
- Marlowe, Ann (May 7, 2012). "1970; 1972: Linda Lovelace". In Marcus, Greil; Sollors, Werner (eds.). A New Literary History of America. Harvard University Press; Belknap Press. ISBN 9780674064102.
