= Raid on Ghadames =

Series of attacks on Ghadames, Libya in 2011

Coordinates: 30°8′N 9°30′E

- Part of Libyan Civil War
Date	24–26 September 2011
Location	Ghadames, Libya
Result	Indecisive: Pro-Gaddafi forces filter across border from Algeria and attack NTC positions in the city; Anti-Gaddafi forces drive off attackers

Belligerents
(Libya) Anti-Gaddafi forces: National Liberation Army	(History of Libya under Muammar Gaddafi) Gaddafi Loyalists: Paramilitary forces; Elements of the Khamis Brigade; Algerian mercenaries

Strength
400 fighters	100 fighters

Casualties and losses
9–11 killed 75 wounded	Unknown

The raid on Ghadames was a series of hit-and-run attacks carried out between 24 and 26 September 2011 by groups of pro-Gaddafi forces, allegedly including elements of the Khamis Brigade, against the National Transitional Council-administered desert oasis town of Ghadames, Libya, during the Libyan Civil War.

== Background ==
Ghadames, an oasis town with a population of around 10,000, lies surrounded by desert in a corner of western Libya, bordering both Algeria and Tunisia. The city is home to one of five UNESCO World Heritage Sites in Libya. Throughout much of the conflict, Ghadames remained isolated and cut off from communications. As such, news from the town was scant and control of the town was not easy to discern. Some reports said that Ghadames remained "under siege" by loyalists for months; however, when anti-Gaddafi forces retook the town in late August, these reports were shown to be outdated. After the war, National Geographic reported that rebels had indeed staged an uprising in the town, but that a loyalist Tuareg militia suppressed it at some point.

== Raid ==
After apparently filtering across the Libya-Algeria border in cars for several days, loyalist forces launched an attack on NTC forces in the city of Ghadames on 24 September. The raid began at around 5:30 AM as group of around 100 loyalists, allegedly including mercenaries from Algeria and groups of Tuareg, entered the city and began attacking NTC positions. Local pro-Gaddafi sleeper cells were also reported by local officials to have joined in on the raid. Anti-Gaddafi forces lost 6-8 fighters and suffered more than 60 wounded before driving loyalists back into the desert. Sporadic shelling of the town by loyalists continued after the raid, and anti-Gaddafi forces continued to engage in clashes with loyalists as they pursued them out of the town.

By the next day, the town was once again clear, but NTC forces had increased security, setting up new checkpoints and posting snipers at key locations. Colonel Ahmed Bani, an NTC spokesman, said that he expected that loyalists would continue to try to use the vast desert area outside of Ghadames as a base of operations, but that anti-Gaddafi forces had secured the area and would not allow another attack. During the night, another series of clashes erupted which continued into the morning of 26 September, leaving another three rebels dead and a dozen wounded.
