= Kais al-Hilali =

Libyan political artist (1979 – 2011)

- Born: Around 1979; Libya
- Died: March 20, 2011 (aged 31–32); Benghazi, Libya
- Occupation: Artist
- Known for: political cartoonist

Kais al-Hilali (1979 – 20 March 2011) was a Libyan political cartoonist shot and killed on 20 March 2011 during the Libyan Civil War minutes after painting one of the political street murals for which he was locally famous. According to witnesses, he had just drawn a caricature of Muammar Gaddafi on a wall in Benghazi when the bullet hit.

When the uprising began, al-Hilali and his friends started drawing caricatures on paper and distributing them around the city for people to show at demonstrations or hang on walls.

== Cartoonist revolutionary ==
Kais was among demonstrators who stormed the city's Khattiba barracks on 20 February, but his contribution was different from that of those armed with rocks and petrol bombs. Instead of fighting, he painted a large cartoon across the Khattiba walls depicting Colonel Gaddafi beside the rebels' two-fingered victory salute. In other wall murals he drew images of Gaddafi accompanied by the mocking comic wording, 'The monkey of all monkeys in Africa'. In a video for TF1, a national French channel, Hilali says, in Arabic, "Gaddafi calls himself the King of Kings of Africa; I say he's the Monkey of Monkeys of Africa."

== Death ==
He was reportedly gunned down by secret police when a car he was a passenger in stopped at a checkpoint. The group of artists that now paint the artistic murals in Benghazi, goes by his name and continues to work from a ramshackle office in a makeshift media centre next to the city court.

He received a message to stop the artists' group claim. It claims the death threat was delivered by Gaddafi's security agents before they were chased out of the eastern part of city.

== Media tributes ==
The New Yorker magazine commented on his death, "The network of international cartoonists is tight, and when a fellow artist dies unjustly, word travels fast. It saddens and enrages cartoonists, and their response is to draw."

Kais's death was reported by journalists in many of the world's leading television stations and newspapers. However, it was the reaction and response from his fellow cartoonists in the same organisations that paid the ultimate tribute to Kais. At the time of his death his anti Gaddafi murals were only known to the residents of Benghazi. To mark the brutal nature of this death leading cartoonists from newspapers around the globe published cartoons in tribute to him and in protest at his murder, many portraying Colonel Gaddafi as being responsible for his death.

His death was marked across the world by an outpouring of art from political cartoonists, many drawing their personal take on al-Hilali's death, including Jeff Danziger, a New York Times Syndicate cartoonist in New York City; Stavro Jabra of Lebanon; Cristian Sampaio of Portugal; Butti Manfuelli of Corsica; Avi Katz of Israel; Riber Hansso of Sweden; Saul Cabanillas of Spain; and Michael Kithla and Giorgio Foraltina.

CNN, and Republica TV-Radio news networks carried reports on his life and death with CNN referring to his wall murals as 'works of art'.

His death and the social impact of his art was reported by Rod Nordlandin the New York Times.

The Australian Newspaper commented 'The young rebel artist lived to fight with his brushes and paints, eschewing Libya's weapons and bloodshed in favour of the satirical anti-Gaddafi graffiti and caricatures that he daubed across Benghazi's walls.

Irish newspaper publisher Des Grant stated that a street in Benghazi should be named after Kais he repeated the comments on the artist's Facebook page.
