= Gulf of Sidra =

Body of water in the Mediterranean Sea on the northern coast of Libya

- Gulf of Sirte
- خليج سرت (Arabic)
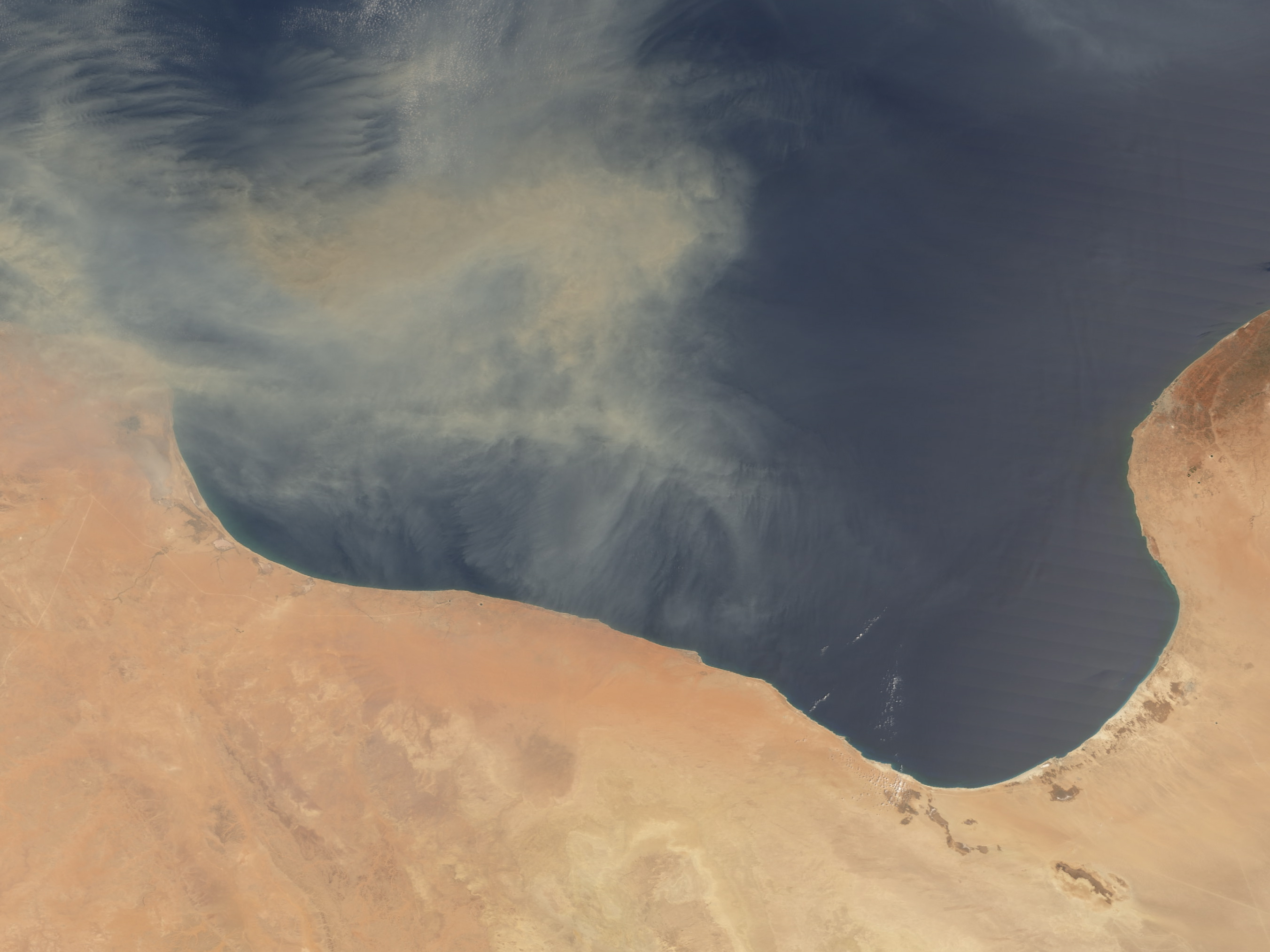
- Satellite image of the Gulf of Sidra (2007)

- Location within Libya
- Coordinates: 31°30′N 18°00′E
- Ocean/sea sources: Mediterranean
- Basin countries: Libya
- Max. length: 177 km (110 mi)
- Max. width: 439 km (273 mi)
- Surface area: 57,000 km^{2} (22,000 sq mi)
- Settlements: Sidra, Sirte, Ra's Lanuf, Al Burayqah

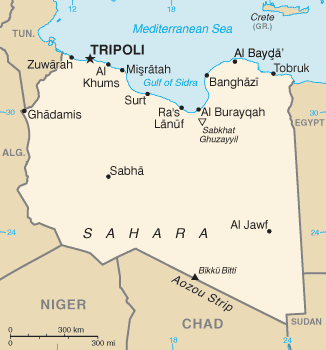
Map of Libya

The Gulf of Sidra (Arabic: خليج السدرة, romanized: Khalij as-Sidra), also known as the Gulf of Sirte (Arabic: خليج سرت, romanized: Khalij Surt), is a body of water in the Mediterranean Sea on the northern coast of Libya, named after the oil port of Sidra or the city of Sirte. It was also historically known as the Great Sirte or Greater Syrtis (Latin: Syrtis Major; Ancient Greek: Σύρτις μεγάλη; contrasting with Syrtis Minor on the coast of Tunisia).

== Geography ==
The Gulf of Sidra or Sirte has been a major center for tuna fishing in the Mediterranean for centuries. It gives its name to the city of Sirte situated on its western coast.

The gulf measures 439 kilometres (273 mi) from the promontory of Boreum (now Ras Teyonas) on the east side to the promontory of Cephalae (Ras Kasr Hamet) on the west. The greatest extension of the gulf inland is 177 kilometres (110 mi) land inward and it occupies an area of 57,000 square kilometres.

== History ==
=== Ancient history ===
In ancient literature, the Syrtes (the Greater, or majores, in the eastern and the Lesser, or minores, in the western part of the Gulf) were notorious sandbanks, which sailors always took pains to avoid. The local climate features frequent calms and a relatively powerful north wind. The shoreline between Cyrene in the east and Carthage in the west featured few ports.

Ancient writers frequently mention the sandbanks and their vicinity as dangerous for shipping. The Syrtes maiores are unusually tidal and feature a strong (3 knots) clockwise current, at the rising tide, which then switches when the tide ebbs. That feature may explain the curious corkscrew shape in the area on the Peutinger Table. The landward side was a featureless plain which contrasted with the fertility of the rest of Tripolitania, to the west.

Ancient writers mention sandstorms and serpents in this area. Strabo describes a march by the Roman general, Cato the Younger in 47 BC which took thirty days "through deep and scorching sand". Strabo also gives a full account of the dangers for shipping: "the difficulty with both the Greater and the Lesser Syrtes is that in many places the water is shallow, and at the rise and fall of the tides ships sometimes fall into the shallows and settle there, and it is rare for them to be saved" (17.3.20). Pomponius Mela gives a very melodramatic description: "The Syrtes [Minores] ... have no ports and are alarming because of the frequent shallows and even more dangerous because of the reversing movements of the sea as it flows in and out ... then [there is] a second Syrtes, equal in name and nature to the first, but about twice the size" (1.35–37).

These sources should not however be taken at face value: Mela goes on to say that there were no ports in the Greater Syrtes either, but his reliability on this point – and therefore presumably others – is highly questionable: Pseudo-Scylax, writing in the early 4th century BC, records a port in the larger gulf (109), and Strabo places a "very large emporium" in the smaller one before Mela's time (17.3.17). Furthermore, the ancient textual evidence is not unambiguous in its condemnation of the Syrtes. Plutarch gives a much less melodramatic account of Cato's march than Strabo's, saying (admittedly implausibly) that it took only seven days, and that locals were engaged to protect his troops from serpents (Cato Minor 56; see also the uneventful late 5th-century journey along the coast from Euesperides to Neapolis reported at Thucydides 7.50.2). And while Strabo pointed out the dangers of the sandbanks, he continues: "On this account sailors travel along the coast at a distance, taking care lest they are caught off their guard and driven into these gulfs by winds." As in Cato, they do not avoid the area, but merely take precautions against its relative dangers. Similarly, Pliny's warning that the gulf was "formidable because of the shallow and tidal water of the two Syrtes" at Natural History 5.26 should be seen in the context of his broader claim in that work that all the coastlines of the Mediterranean were welcoming (NH 2.118).

Their infamous reputation is, however, found in Roman poetry, for example Catullus (Carmen LXIV, 156) and Virgil (Aeneid IV, 41) on.

The information in this section is largely taken from The Syrtes between East and West by Josephine Crawley Quinn.

=== World War II ===
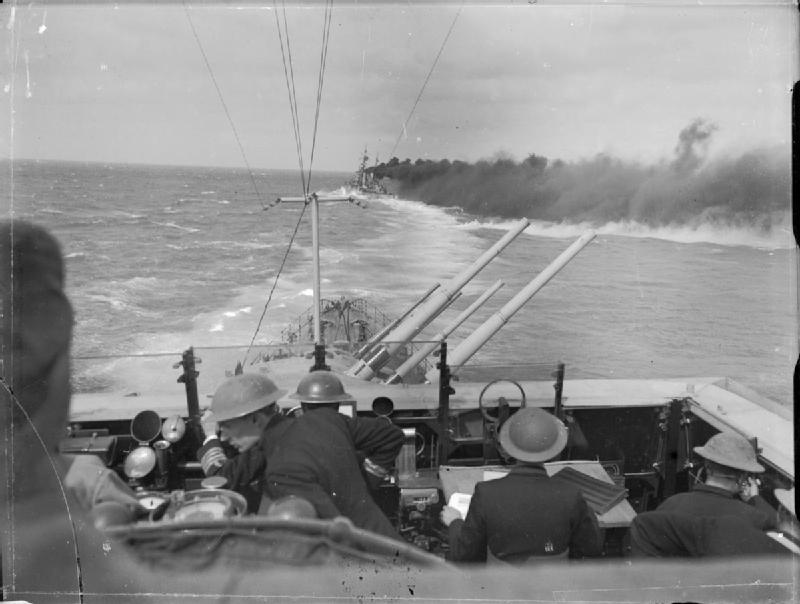
British cruisers Cleopatra (making smoke) and Euryalus (foreground) moving into action during the Second Battle of Sirte in 1942

Two naval battles were fought in the Gulf of Sidra in World War II:

- First Battle of Sirte, between Regia Marina and the Royal Navy in December 1941.
- Second Battle of Sirte, between Regia Marina and the Royal Navy in March 1942.

=== Cold War ===
After the coup d'état which brought Muammar Gaddafi to power in 1969, there were a number of international incidents concerning territorial claims of the Gaddafi regime over the waters of the Gulf of Sidra. The gulf was generally referred to by the US military in those times as "Gulf of Sidra", after the increasingly important oil port of Sidra on its shores.

==== 1973 ====
In 1973, Gaddafi claimed much of the Gulf of Sidra to be within Libyan internal waters by drawing a straight line at 32 degrees, 30 minutes north between a point near Benghazi and the western headland of the gulf at Misrata with an exclusive 62 nautical miles (115 km) fishing zone. Gaddafi declared it the Line of Death, the crossing of which would invite a military response. The US claimed its rights to conduct naval operations in international waters, using the modern international standard of 12-nautical-mile (22 km) territorial limit from a country's shore as defined by the 1982 United Nations Convention on the Law of the Sea. Gaddafi claimed it to be a territorial sea, not just a coastal area. In response the United States authorized Naval exercises in the Gulf of Sidra to conduct freedom of navigation (FON) operations.

On 21 March 1973, Libyan fighter planes intercepted and fired on a U.S. Air Force C-130 conducting signals intelligence off the Libyan coast. During the encounter, two Libyan Mirage fighters signaled the C-130 to follow them toward Libya and land, prompting the American plane to take evasive action. The C-130 received cannon fire from the Libyan fighters as it fled, but was able to escape by using cloud cover. According to US officials, the American plane was never closer than 120 kilometres to the Libyan coast.

==== 1980 ====
While operating over the Mediterranean Sea on 16 September 1980, a US Boeing RC-135V/W reconnaissance plane was fired on by a Libyan fighter. The RC-135 was not hit and the United States took no retaliatory action after the incident.

==== 1981 ====
In August 1981, during the United States Sixth Fleet Freedom of Navigation exercises, Libyan fighter planes were assembled from elsewhere in the country to fly patrols near the American ships. On 19 August, two Libyan Su-22 Fitter fighter-bombers were intercepted by two F-14 Tomcat fighters from the aircraft carrier Nimitz. During the engagement, one of the American planes was targeted by an air-to-air Atoll missile. After evading the missile, the Tomcats shot down both Libyan planes with Sidewinder missiles. According to some reports, the two Libyan pilots managed to eject and were rescued from the sea. According to other reports, the parachute of one of the Libyan pilots failed to open.

==== 1986 ====
In the spring of 1986, the U.S. Navy deployed three aircraft carrier task force groups, USS America, USS Coral Sea and USS Saratoga from the Sixth Fleet with 225 aircraft and some 30 warships across the "Line of Death" and into the disputed Gulf of Sidra. After a day of armed conflict, the operation was terminated after an unknown number of human and materiel losses to the Libyan side and no losses to the American side.

Two weeks later on 5 April 1986, a bomb exploded in a West Berlin disco, La Belle, killing two American servicemen, a Turkish woman and wounding 200 others. The United States claimed to have obtained cable transcripts from Libyan agents in East Germany involved in the attack. After several days of diplomatic talks with European and Arab partners, President Ronald Reagan ordered eighteen F-111F strike aircraft of the 48th Tactical Fighter Wing, flying from RAF Lakenheath supported by four EF-111A Ravens of the 20th Tactical Fighter Wing, from RAF Upper Heyford in England to strike targets in Libya in conjunction with fifteen A-6, A-7, F/A-18 attack aircraft and EA-6B Prowler Electronic Warfare Aircraft from the aircraft carriers USS Saratoga, USS America and USS Coral Sea on station in the Gulf of Sidra. The planes flying from Britain had to fly over the Atlantic, down the coast of Spain, and then turn east into the Mediterranean because the French and Spanish governments refused permission to use their airspace for the attack. This necessitated use of mid-air refueling. The attack lasted about ten minutes, hitting several targets early on 15 April. Two American airmen were killed when their plane was shot down over the Gulf of Sidra. Forty-five Libyan soldiers and government officials and fifteen civilians were also killed.

==== 1989 ====
In 1989, in another Gulf of Sidra incident, two Libyan MiG-23 Flogger aircraft were shot down when it was believed they were about to attack the U.S. fighters that were in the area. In this instance, the Flogger pilots were reportedly lost when they were fired on and successfully shot down after a series of missile launches, although they were seen to eject and parachute into the sea.

=== 2011 Libyan Civil War ===
The Gulf of Sidra in the Libyan Civil War.

- First Battle of Brega, 2 March 2011
- Battle of Ra's Lanuf, 4–12 March 2011
- Battle of Bin Jawad, 6 March 2011
- Second Battle of Brega, 13–15 March 2011
- First Gulf of Sidra offensive, 26–30 March 2011
- Third Battle of Brega, 31 March – 6 April 2011
- Second Gulf of Sidra offensive, 22 August – 20 October 2011
- Battle of Sirte, 15 September – 20 October 2011

== See also ==
- Libyan Sea
- Libya (GNA)–Turkey maritime deal
- Exclusive economic zone of Greece
