= 2008 Kufra conflict =

Armed conflict in Libya

| Date | Early November – end November 2008 |
| Location | Kufra, Cyrenaica, Libya |
| Result | Libyan victory |

Belligerents
| Libya | Toubou Front for the Salvation of Libya |

Commanders and leaders
| Muammar Gaddafi | Issa Abdel Majid Mansur |

Casualties and losses
- 11–30 killed Hundreds wounded

The 2008 Kufra conflict was an armed conflict in the Kufra region of Libya, between the pro-Toubou Toubou Front for the Salvation of Libya (TFSL) faction, and the Libyan Government.

== Background ==
After a successful coup d'état led by Muammar Gaddafi in 1969, and the republic being established; Gaddafi, an Arab nationalist like Egyptian President Gamal Abdel Nasser, started to Arabize the country. A couple of months later, a new law was passed which made Libya an Arab state and replaced it with the 1951 constitution. The 1951 constitution states, "Libyans shall be equal before the law" and also it also mentioned "shall enjoy equal civil and political rights without distinction of religion, belief, race, language, weight kinship, or political or social opinion." Since then Arabic became the sole official language of Libya; both languages and cultures from minority groups like Aujila, Ghat, Ghadames, Hun, Imazighen, Jalo, Toubou, Socra and Zuwara peoples had no room in the country. Especially the Imazighen and the Toubou tribes who were persecuted and harassed by the regime. Until August 2007 a controversial law which bans Imazighen women giving birth to their children an Imazighen name. School-age children were also forced to adopt an Arabic name before they can register themselves for school.

== Conflict ==
The conflict started in early November 2008 when the Libyan Government stripped ethnic Toubous of their citizenship, claiming that their leaders had sided with their rival Chad. The clashes began when TFSL set a local government's office on fire.

Following the incident the government dispatched army units and helicopters to the region, putting Kufra under siege. The clashes stopped in mid-November when both parties agreed to a cease-fire. On 20 November 2008, a Toubou tribal meeting with Libyan officials was held in Kufra to end the conflict. The conflict had led to the deaths of 11 to 30 people, with over a hundred being wounded.

== Bibliography ==
- Ennaji, Moha (2014). Multiculturalism and Democracy in North Africa: Aftermath of the Arab Spring. London: Routledge. ISBN 978-1317-813-61-3.
