= First Battle of Zawiya =

2011 battle in the Libyan civil war

Coordinates: 32°45′8″N 12°43′40″E

- Part of Libyan Civil War
Date	24 February – 9/10 March 2011
Location	Zawia
Result	Decisive pro-Gaddafi victory: City retaken by loyalist forces

Belligerents
(Libya) Anti-Gaddafi forces: National Liberation Army	Libyan Arab Jamahiriya

Commanders and leaders
(Libya) Hussein Darbouk †	(Libya) Khamis Gaddafi (Libya) Khouildi Hamidi (Libya) Mahdi al-Arabi (Libya) Muftah Anaqrat † (Libya) Mohamed Gayth †

Strength
300–400	Khamis Brigade; Hosban Brigade

Casualties and losses
235–600 killed** 300+ wounded 37 captured up to 50 tanks, APCs and 2S1 Gvozdika howitzers destroyed or captured	65 killed 50 wounded 29–31 captured 4+ T-72 tanks or BMPs destroyed 1 Shilka destroyed
- *Unconfirmed rebel claims **At least 151 of those killed were rebels, possibly more, while the rest were civilians.

The First Battle of Zawiya or Zawia was a battle during the Libyan Civil War between army units and militiamen loyal to Muammar Gaddafi and anti-Gaddafi forces for control of the city of Zawia.

The city quickly fell into rebels hands with soldiers from Libyan Army units defecting. Zawia was the rebel city which was closest to Tripoli, and its control became the main focus of Gaddafi troops. The city was besieged and regularly attacked by loyalists with rebels defending the center of the town. The final assault lasted one week and was led by the Khamis Brigade, the best trained unit of the Libyan army. The rebellion was ultimately crushed in the city and Gaddafi troops took complete control of the town, searching for suspected rebels and erasing any sign of the rebellion.

Along with the Battle of Misrata, the First Battle of Zawiya was one of the bloodiest clashes of the Libyan Civil War.

== The battle ==
=== Rebels take control, initial loyalist counterattacks ===
24 February – 1 March

The battle began on 24 February, when Libyan troops loyal to Gaddafi attacked a mosque where protesters were holding an anti-government sit-in. The troops opened fire with automatic weapons and hit the minaret with an anti-aircraft gun. After the attack, thousands of people rallied in Green Square by the mosque shouting "Leave! Leave!" On the same day, anti-Gaddafi forces repelled the attack on the city.

On 26 February, government forces opened fire on anti-government protesters and Egyptian migrant workers. By this point, most of the city was under rebel control — however, security forces controlled surrounding areas and had set up checkpoints on the outskirts. In addition, some government militia and security forces were still present in the city and at least one tank was seen. 24 rebel fighters were killed during the two previous days of fighting.

On 28 February, government troops conducted a counter-attack against the city with 200 soldiers coming in from the east, supported by snipers, tanks and artillery. The first attack came just after midnight when loyalist soldiers tried to come through the eastern city gate in pick-up trucks. The attack was repelled. In the early evening, a second attack by fighters in three more trucks tried to break through the west gate. Two of the trucks were destroyed. At the same time, six more pick-ups again attacked the eastern gate. Two were captured by rebel forces. During the clashes one government tank was damaged by a rocket propelled grenade. After six hours of fighting, government troops were unable to reclaim the city. 10 soldiers were killed in the street fighting and 12–14 were captured, of which eight switched sides and joined the rebels.

=== Continued loyalist gains, Darbouk killed ===
2 March – 4 March

On the night of 2 March, rebel forces attacked government lines around the city killing two loyalist soldiers. By this point, shortages of food and medical supplies in the city had started as a result of the siege.

On 4 March, government troops attacked once again bombarding the rebels with mortars, heavy machine guns, anti-aircraft guns and a prolonged artillery barrage coming from at least eight Grad missile launchers. Troops attacked on both sides of the city. In the initial fighting, the rebel forces commander, colonel Hussein Darbouk, was killed along with three more fighters. Later, the casualty toll was raised to "up to 50 dead" and 300 wounded on that day. Two government soldiers were also killed. In the evening, the rebels were pushed back to the central square in Zawiya, where they were preparing to make a last stand. Government forces claimed to have captured 31 tanks, 19 armored personnel carriers and other weapons including rocket-launchers and anti-aircraft guns that were used by the rebels.

=== Fighting for central square, intensifying loyalist assaults ===
5 March – 8 March

By the morning of 5 March, pro-Gaddafi soldiers were reported to have been beaten back from the centre of the city, after overnight fighting, however they still controlled the town's entry points. At six in the morning, another assault was underway, which started with a surprise barrage of mortar shells. At 7 a.m., at least 20 tanks entered the city and heavy street fighting started with loyalists storming residential buildings and reportedly killing people inside to secure the rooftops for snipers. Initially, the rebels retreated to positions deeper in the city and government tanks were seen pouring onto the square. Still, after a few hours, a rebel counteroffensive was launched and loyalist forces were again beaten back from the centre of the city to the city's edge by 10 a.m. During these morning battles, thirty-three people were reported killed. Twenty-five of them were rebels and eight were pro-Gaddafi soldiers. Five government armored vehicles were destroyed at the square, among them two or three tanks. At 4 p.m., a third pro-Gaddafi attack commenced, accompanied by an artillery barrage, but it too was repulsed. During this attack, government troops positioned themselves once again at the square and tank and rocket fire was directed at buildings around it, before retreating. However, the loyalists managed to secure the hospital and, because of this, the rebels moved all of their wounded to a makeshift clinic at a mosque. 10 loyalist soldiers were captured during the fighting and later executed in a hotel at the square. During the night, it was confirmed that government tanks were seen roaming the city.

On 6 March, a fourth attack in two days was launched against the city centre and it too was repelled. 26 government soldiers and three rebels were reportedly killed and 11 soldiers captured during the latest charge by loyalist troops.

On 7 March at 9 a.m., a fifth attack started and continued well into the afternoon. Government forces had once again managed to take the city's central square and also a nearby mosque.

By 8 March, most of the city had been left in ruins with tanks firing in all directions. During the night, rebels had once again taken back the square. However, with dawn, the strongest attack yet came with 50 tanks and 120 pick-ups charging towards the city center. During the evening, a force of 60 rebels slipped out of the city in an attempt to attack a military base 20 kilometres from the city. By the next day, they had not returned and their fate was not known.

=== Loyalists capture the city ===
9 March – 11 March

On 9 March, the city was reported to be ninety-five percent under loyalist control as rebels retreated from the main square and troops moved in. Later that evening, rebels and a few local witnesses claimed that the rebels had retaken the main square and that the regime's forces were driven back to 1 kilometre (0.62 miles) from the city centre. Forty opposition members and several loyalists were reported killed during the day's fighting, including a general and a colonel. Nine rebels were killed in the battle for the square. The suburbs of the city had been confirmed as cleared and captured by loyalists after the government bussed journalists to a floodlit stadium where some 300 Gaddafi supporters were celebrating with fireworks.

On 10 March, the city was retaken by loyalist forces. Reporters from The Times and the ITV television network reported from the square in Zawiya where they confirmed it was under government control and clean-up operations were underway. Later, locals confirmed that tanks were lined along the square. The mopping-up operations were focused on smaller remaining pockets of resistance and some street fighting continued during the day.

On 11 March, rebels claimed they were still in control in Zawiya. However, just a few hours later, a pro-Gaddafi rally, arranged by the government, was held in the centre of the city, witnessed by 100 foreign journalists, confirming the city was under loyalist control.

== Aftermath ==
By early April 2011, the uprising having been quashed. Thousands of Zawiyans had been taken away for questioning in the last few weeks, according to rebel sources. On 25 April, the Voice of Russia reported that guerrilla attacks had resumed in Zawiya, indicating that the rebels still maintained a presence in the city.

Renewed fighting in the city had occurred on 11 June, with anti-Gaddafi forces launching an attack against the city. A spokesman for the rebels' national council said that the opposition fighters were in control of a large area on the western side of the city. However, there was no independent confirmation of the claim. Later the same day, a Reuters crew confirmed that the coastal road was shut down and deserted, except for a large number of soldiers, police and armed men in civilian clothes. Residents also confirmed that fighting begun during the morning between loyalist forces and rebels and described fighting as "heavy".

However, by late on 12 June, the rebel attack on the city had been defeated and loyalist forces were in firm control, which was confirmed by reporters taken from Tripoli to Zawiya.

In early August, anti-Gaddafi forces launched an offensive into the plains surrounding Zawiya, reaching the city outskirts. On 13 August, it was reported that rebel forces had attempted to advance into Zawiya. Governmental officials claimed that the rebels had been defeated, while rebels claimed that they controlled portions of the city, possibly including the city center. Al Jazeera confirmed that rebels had been fighting within the city suburbs and gates. By 20 August, rebels had taken full control of the city including the eastern parts, which was confirmed by journalists who were taken to former loyalists positions.

== See also ==
- Second Battle of Zawiya
