= Fourth Battle of Brega =

Battle of the Libyan Civil War, fought 14–21 July 2011

Coordinates: 30°26′6″N 19°40′1″E

- Part of Libyan Civil War
Date	14–21 July 2011 (1 week) (First phase); 9–22 August 2011 (1 week and 6 days) (Second phase)
Location	Brega, Libya
Result	Pro-Gaddafi victory (First phase); Anti-Gaddafi victory (Second phase)

Belligerents
(Libya) Anti-Gaddafi forces: National Liberation Army; (United Nations) UNSC forces: NATO command	(Libya) Gaddafi Loyalists: Libyan Army; Paramilitary forces

Commanders and leaders
(Libya) Gen. Abdul Fatah Younis X (Libya) Col. Hamid Hassy	(Libya) Mutassim Gaddafi

Strength
5,000	3,000–7,000

Casualties and losses
73 killed, 627 wounded, several tanks disabled and several dozen technicals damaged (First phase); 1 killed, 4 wounded (Inter-period); 70 killed, 189 wounded (Second phase); Total dead & wounded: 144 killed, 820 wounded	30 killed, 10–20 captured (First phase); 12 killed (Second phase); Total dead & captured: 42 killed, 10–20 captured 37 technicals, 3 tanks, 11 IFVs, 3 MRLs, 2 rocket launchers (First phase) 16 technicals, 3 tanks, 9 MRLs, 3 Rocket launchers, 1 towed artillery gun (Second phase) (NATO claim)
- 1 civilian killed

The Fourth Battle of Brega was a battle in July and August 2011, during the Libyan Civil War, between forces loyal to Muammar Gaddafi and forces of the Libyan opposition for control of the strategic town of Brega and its oil port.

== Background ==
After about three months of stalemate on Libya's "eastern front", interrupted only by the occasional clash between infantry units and some artillery duels, opposition military commanders launched an offensive to reclaim control of the town.

Map showing rebel and loyalist-held territory and troop movements.

== The battle ==
=== First rebel offensive ===
14 July

The battle commenced on 14 July, in the aftermath of the Battle of Brega-Ajdabiya road, which had largely been a long stalemate. The rebels were armed with refurbished and repaired T-72 and T-55 tanks and armoured personnel carriers as well as armed technical trucks. Three rebels were killed and 73 were wounded. Opposition forces advanced via the southern desert highway, the main central coastal road, and from the sea to the north of the town. At one point, rebels claimed that loyalist forces were in retreat to an area called Bishr (Bashir), 20 km to the west of Brega. However, Libyan government's spokesman Mussa Ibrahim stated several hours later that the military repulsed the attack by opposition forces, who had air and naval support from NATO, stating that NATO was violating the UN resolution once again.

15 July

By the next day, the rebels themselves confirmed that their attack had failed and that they had fallen back to their previous positions where battles with loyalist forces continued on three fronts. Late on the second day of the fighting, rebel forces on a recon mission breached Brega, but pulled back to prepare for a fresh offensive the next day. In addition to the large number of casualties suffered by the rebels, pro-Gaddafi forces also sustained a number of dead and wounded during the fighting. At this point, the rebels' forward position closest to Brega was four kilometres to the north of the town. A second rebel force attacking from due east of Brega faced stiffer resistance and was about 10-20 kilometres (six to 12 miles) from the town. To the south of the town, where the rebels had made initial gains but suffered large numbers of casualties, Gaddafi forces had pushed back harder.

16 July

During the morning before dawn on the third day of fighting, according to some reports, rebel forces managed to enter Brega's outskirts but encountered heavy government shelling and multiple land mines. The rebels also stated that they captured four loyalist soldiers since the start of the battle. As for the rebels, the number of casualties on their side during the day was 12 dead and 178 wounded due to the shelling and mines. During 16 July, it was once again reported that the loyalist were withdrawing to Bishr. However, no independent media followed up on the story and later rebel command stated opposition forces were still on the town's outskirts, moving slowly because of hundreds of land mines. They were also slowed due to defensive trenches around the city that had been filled with flammable chemicals by retreating loyalist troops. Government forces had mostly pulled back into the town from its outskirts and left the booby-trapped trenches behind. Most opposition troops were reportedly still 20 kilometres east of Brega by the end of the third day.

17 July

On 17 July, three rebels were killed and 96-127 wounded in street-to-street fighting in residential areas of Brega. A rebel spokesman claimed that opposition forces had captured the north-eastern part of the town and were engaging loyalist troops in the south-western section.

18 July

On 18 July, rebels announced that the main body of loyalist forces had retreated to Ra's Lanuf while the main group of rebel forces was already behind Brega and was heading towards Bishr and El Agheila. The rest of the rebel forces were still cleaning up mines and engaging pockets of resistance in Brega where an estimated 150-200 loyalist soldiers were still holed up in the industrial area. However, in the evening, the government stated they were still in control of Brega, vowing to hold it after claiming to have killed 520 rebels, and a rebel commander and fighters returning from the front said that opposition forces did manage to surround the town and enter the residential eastern part of the city, but the loyalists were still holding the western industrial area. Also, rebel forces coming in from the east were significantly slowed by the burning trenches which they were not able to extinguish because of a constant flow of oil into them from an oil pipeline directly linked to the trench system. The rebels were also receiving rocket fire from the direction of Bashir.

19 July

On 19 July, the rebels once again declared they were in full control of the town, except a few parts of the city (including the downtown section) to which they couldn't get to because of a high concentration of mines, but this was in contrast to the situation on the ground where there was still ongoing fighting. NATO itself stated it was not sure who controlled the town and described the situation as fluid. Its aircraft were having problems to follow the movements of loyalist forces in Brega because of the black smoke coming from burning oil trenches. 13 rebels were killed and 45 others wounded near Brega by loyalist artillery fire after government troops approached opposition positions in trucks carrying rebel flags. By the end of the day, rebel officers stated that opposition forces had captured only a third of the town and were still fighting in the residential area of Brega. A rebel commander stated that opposition forces would need another 10 days before they could take complete control of Brega. At the same time, Al Jazeera reported that opposition forces had still not entered Brega, despite managing to surround it, and were mainly positioned 10 kilometres east of the town, hampered by mines.

20 July

On 20 July, there were no reports of major fighting, but the rebel casualties from the previous day rose to 27 dead and 83-121 wounded, putting the total of rebels killed since the beginning of the battle at over 50.

21 July

On 21 July, it was reported that loyalist forces had booby-trapped the vital petroleum installations in Brega so that they can be destroyed if government troops lose the town. The rebels characterized the town as a "big minefield". It was also reported that the rebels had pulled back from the city and were partially encircling it with only the western approach into Brega still under loyalist control.

=== Between attacks ===
By the end of July, the city was still in control of the Gaddafi army and the rebel effort to take Brega had stalled. They were reported to be 20 km away from Brega and the battle was back to the Brega-Ajdabiya road.

On 31 July, rebels said that they were planning a new offensive on Brega, which was still held and defended by 3,000 well-armed loyalists.

On 1 August, rebel fighters claimed that they had been able, after two weeks of slow advance, to push through minefields to the edge of the suburbs of Brega and were within the sight of the city, some 5 to 7 kilometres away.

On 2 August, opposition forces claimed that a small unit of 45 rebel fighters managed to enter the eastern residential district of Brega from which they, after a four-hour battle, retreated.

On 5 August, the rebels claimed to have captured a hill overlooking part of the town.

=== Second rebel offensive ===
6 August

On 6 August, the rebels launched a second attempt to take the town. However, due to the extensive minefields on the approaches to Brega, the opposition force's advance was painfully slow and it would be three days before the rebels managed to reach the outskirts.

9 August

On 9 August, two rebels were killed and 14 wounded in fighting near the outskirts. According to rebel commander Faraj Moftah, rebel fighters were able to penetrate the residential area once again.

10 August

On 10 August, AFP and Reuters correspondents were taken to the frontline which lay near the residential area, on the hill overlooking the town. Correspondents also witnessed exchange of artillery fire from both sides in the coastal northern area of residential district of New Brega. Commander Faraj Moftar claimed that up to this point the rebels were surrounding the town and using artillery in order to empty it of most of the resistance and hoped that they can march into the residential area in coming days.

11 August

On 11 August, rebels claimed that they were engaged, once again, in fighting in the residential district of New Brega where three fighters had been killed the previous day. In the evening, a National Liberation Army spokesman in Benghazi announced that New Brega residential district was captured. A few hours later, in a telephone call with the Associated Press correspondent, rebel commander Mohammed al-Rijali announced from Ajdabiya that Brega had fallen under opposition control. These claims could not be immediately verified. During the day's fighting, 11 opposition fighters were killed and 40 wounded. Loyalist casualties were unknown.

12 August

On 12 August, it was confirmed that the industrial area of Brega, which includes the old town and the oil port, was under loyalist control and that the town was not fully secured by the opposition forces, contradicting their earlier claims. Libyan deputy foreign minister Khalis Kaim denied that the rebels took the residential part of the town, stating that it was "in their dream".

13 August

On 13 August, the rebels began an advance from New Brega toward the industrial area, 10 km to the southwest, reportedly destroying two loyalist tanks along the way. At the same time, fighting was still ongoing in the residential district, with rebels stating that they had taken residential area number 2, after number 3 the previous day, out of four zones. This once again contradicted their earlier claims of capturing the whole area of New Brega.

14 August

On 14 August, loyalist forces reportedly set ablaze several oil tanks in the industrial area.

15 August

On 15 August, rebels once again claimed to have complete control of the residential area, but had still not captured the industrial zone. According to Al Jazeera, the main impediments to the rebel advance were vast minefields surrounding the city, with more than 3,000 mines having been collected over three days. Loyalist forces based in Sirte launched a SCUD missile towards rebel lines in the Brega/Ajdabiya area, but it overshot the target by 50 miles and landed harmlessly in the desert. 26 rebel fighters were killed during the day and 40 were wounded while they were consolidating their gains in the residential area and preparing an advance toward the industrial zone.

16 August

On this day, 18 rebel fighters were killed and 74 wounded in intense fighting, mostly on the southern side of Brega.

19 August

Late on 19 August, the rebels captured the industrial zone and with that had control over the entire town.

20 August

On 20 August, opposition forces retreated from Brega's industrial area under Gaddafi forces' artillery fire.

=== Rebel advance on Sirte ===
22 August

A spokesman for the National Liberation Army said on 22 August that Gaddafi's forces had finally retreated westward to Sirte and all of Brega was under the opposition's control, this came as the rebel army in the west of Libya began its march into the heart of Tripoli. But, this was later denied by Ahmed Omar Bani, the rebels' military spokesman, who said the eastern "front is still in Brega."

23 August

However, a day later, it was confirmed that rebel forces managed to capture village of El Agheila and were on their way to Ra's Lanuf. Ra's Lanuf fell to the opposition soon after and they were on the outskirts of the small town of Bin Jawad, just east of Gaddafi's home town of Sirte.

Rebels managed to advance to the outskirts of the small coastal town of Bin Jawad, but were unable to progress further owing to heavy loyalist resistance in the area.

== NATO strikes ==
According to NATO's daily Operational Media Updates, the NATO strikes, during the first offensive, hit:

14 July-to-21 July NATO Strikes
Date	Technicals	Tanks	Armored vehicles	Rocket launchers	Buildings
14 July	1 Armed Vehicle	1 Tank	1 Armoured Fighting Vehicle	1 Multiple Rocket Launcher	1 Command and Control Node
15 July	7 Armed Vehicles	1 Tank	5 Armoured Fighting Vehicles	1 Multiple Rocket Launcher	0
16 July	5 Armed Vehicles	1 Tank	0	1 Multiple Rocket Launcher, 1 Rocket Launcher	0
17 July	9 Armed Vehicles	0	2 Armoured Fighting Vehicles	0	1 Command and Control Node
18 July	8 Armed Vehicles	0	2 Armoured Fighting Vehicles	0	0
19 July	5 Armed Vehicles	0	1 Armoured Fighting Vehicle	0	0
20 July	2 Armed Vehicles	0	0	1 Rocket Launcher	0
21 July	0	0	0	0	1 Military Storage Facility
Total	37	3	11	5	3

According to NATO's daily Operational Media Updates, the NATO strikes, between offensives, hit:

22 July-to-5 August NATO Strikes
Date	Technicals	Tanks	Armored vehicles	Rocket launchers	Buildings
22 July	4 Armed Vehicles	0	0	0	1 Military Storage Facility
23 July	0	0	1 Armoured Fighting Vehicle	1 Rocket Launcher	1 Military Storage Facility, 1 Command and Control Node
24 July	0	0	0	0	1 Military Storage Facility
25 July	11 Light Military Vehicles	2 Tanks	5 Armoured Vehicles	0	1 Military Facility
26 July	5 Military Vehicles	1 Tank	0	0	1 Military Facility
27 July	0	0	3 Armoured Vehicles	1 Multiple Rocket Launcher	2 Military Facilities
28 July	2 Armed Military Vehicles	0	0	0	0
29 July	2 Armed Military Vehicles, 2 Military Logistic Vehicles	0	0	1 Multiple Rocket Launcher	7 Military Facilities
30 July	8 Military Vehicles	1 Tank	0	0	2 Military Facilities
31 July	1 Armed Military Vehicle	0	0	6 Multiple Rocket Launchers	
2 Aug	0	1 Tank	0	0	2 Military Facilities
3 Aug	0	0	0	1 Multiple Rocket Launcher	1 Military Facility
5 Aug	19 Armed Vehicles, 2 Military Supply Vehicles, 5 Military Trucks	2 Tanks	1 Armoured Fighting Vehicle	1 Multiple Rocket Launcher	2 Military Facilities, 6 Military Buildings
Total	61	7	10	11	28

According to NATO's daily Operational Media Updates, the NATO strikes, during the second offensive, hit:

9 August-to-17 August NATO Strikes
Date	Technicals	Tanks	Armored vehicles	Rocket launchers	Artillery Piece	Buildings
9 Aug	4 Armed Vehicles	1 Tank	0	3 Multiple Rocket Launchers	0	1 Military Facility
10 Aug	2 Armed Vehicles	0	0	0	0	0
11 Aug	1 Armed Vehicle	0	0	1 Multiple Rocket Launcher	1 Towed Artillery Piece	0
12 Aug	2 Armed Vehicles	0	0	0	0	0
13 Aug	7 Military Vehicles	0	0	1 Multiple Rocket Launcher	0	0
15 Aug	0	0	0	4 Multiple Rocket Launchers	0	0
17 Aug	0	2 Tanks	0	3 Rocket Launchers	0	0
Total	16	3	0	12	1	1
