= Cyrenaican desert campaign =

2011 military campaign during the Libyan Civil War

Cyrenaican Desert Campaign
- Part of Libyan Civil War
| Date | 3 April – 12 June 2011 |
| Location | Eastern Libyan Desert, Libya |
| Result | Indecisive: Pro-Gaddafi forces capture and hold Kufra from 28 April to 7 May; Anti-Gaddafi forces repel several loyalist raids on Jalu; Pro-Gaddafi forces damage several rebel-held oil pipelines halting oil flow |

Belligerents
| (Libya) Anti-Gaddafi forces: National Liberation Army | (Libya) Gaddafi Loyalists: Libyan Army; Paramilitary forces |

Commanders and leaders
| (Libya) Saleh Muhammad al-Zaruq (Libya) Abdullah Aitha | (Libya) Belqasem Al-Abaaj |

Casualties and losses
| 25 killed | At least 3 killed |
- 5 civilians killed

The Cyrenaican desert campaign was a military campaign that initiated in April 2011 by the Libyan military in the form of hit-and-run attacks against rebel-held towns and oil facilities in the eastern Libyan Desert, during the Libyan Civil War. The campaign failed in denying anti-Gaddafi forces control of southern Cyrenaica.

== Campaign ==
On 3 April, the security chief for the Kufra region, Saleh Muhammad al-Zaruq, declared his and his troops' support for the rebels and broke off from the Gaddafi government, taking control of the area.

On 4 April, loyalist forces blew up a crucial water pipeline near Jalu in an attempt to cut water supplies for rebel-held east Libya. However, during the process, they also inadvertently destroyed part of the pipeline system supplying west Libya as well as the east.

On 6 April, the Gaddafi government stated that a NATO air-strike on the Sarir oil field left three oil facility security guards dead. However, the rebels, who were already in control of the oil field per some reports, claimed that it was not a NATO but a loyalist ground attack.

On 21 April, a convoy of nine loyalist vehicles attacked the rebel-held al-Boster oil facility in the Libyan desert, about 300 kilometres (190 mi) south west of Tobruk. Eight of the nine rebels that were stationed at the pumping station were killed in the attack while the ninth managed to escape while seriously wounded.

On 28 April, loyalist forces entered the town of Kufra, also called Al Jawf, which is the capital of the Kufra District and re-took control of the town from the rebels. The opposition forces put up only light resistance and retreated almost immediately. After that, a convoy of government troops in 50-60 pick-up trucks drove into the city centre and raised the green flag in front of the town's court house. Three people were killed during the initial shelling of Kufra, according to the pro-rebel Brnieq newspaper website.

On 30 April, government troops advanced further north to the town of Jalu, which is just south of the frontline town of Ajdabiya. The military convoy ran through the town opening fire and killing at least 10 people, at least five of them opposition fighters. Three pro-Gaddafi soldiers were killed during the fighting. The convoy than proceeded to the city's northern outskirts and divided into two groups, each positioning itself for the night at Jalu's two oil facilities.

On 1 May, rebels claimed that NATO aircraft hit and destroyed 45 loyalist vehicles while the government military convoy was leaving Jalu. However, NATO made no mention of the convoy destruction during its daily operational update for 1 May, and no NATO or independent confirmation of the claim or the attack was established.

On 6 May, loyalist forces attacked a rebel checkpoint between Jalu and Kufra, killing six rebel fighters. The next day, loyalists conducted a hit-and-run attack against Jalu and the smaller oasis town of Ojla. The rebels also claimed to have re-taken Kufra, but loyalist forces were still in the surrounding area.

On 25 May, rebel forces attacked government troops near Kufra, destroying a weapons-laden vehicle. They claimed that the loyalist force was composed of Sudanese mercenaries.

On 12 June, the last loyalist raid against rebel positions occurred when a force of government troops attacked the Mislah and Sarir oil fields. On 1 July, The Daily Telegraph reported that, mid-June, a Sudanese military force crossed the Libyan border and took control of Kufra and the nearby military base. They had also surrounded the oil fields, but did not appear to be disrupting efforts to resume oil production. Still, the oil fields had suffered extensive damage due to loyalist raids and time was needed to repair them. The fate of the rebel contingent in Kufra was unknown. Sudan later denied any military involvement in Libya.

By 27 June, it was reported loyalist forces were still holding strategic points near Kufra.

== Aftermath ==
In July 2011, National Liberation Army brigades out of Kufra reportedly seized control of much of Murzuq District in the Fezzan and threatened to march on Sabha.
