= Third Battle of Brega =

Battle for control of Brega during Libyan Civil War

Coordinates: 30°26′6″N 19°40′1″E

- Part of First Libyan Civil War
Date	31 March – 7 April 2011 (1 week)
Location	Brega, Libya
Result	Libyan government victory

Belligerents
(Libya) Libyan Opposition; (United Nations) UNSC forces; NATO command; (United States) USA Air Force	(Libya) Libyan Government; Belarus

Commanders and leaders
(Libya) Khalifa Haftar (Libya) Abdul Fatah Younis	(Libya) Muammar Gaddafi

Units involved
(Libya) National Liberation Army; Saaiqa 36 Battalion	Libyan Armed Forces; (Libya) Libyan Army; Paramilitary Forces; (Belarus) Belarusian military advisers

Strength
300–400 volunteers 17 tanks	300 confirmed (by 4 April); 1,000+ possibly

Casualties and losses
46–49 killed 3 tanks destroyed 5 tanks damaged	28 killed
- South African photographer Anton Hammerl killed by Pro-Gaddafi soldiers
- *Number of dead on the rebel side includes 27 killed in NATO air-strikes, as well as 3 tanks destroyed and 5 damaged by NATO

The Third Battle of Brega was fought during the Libyan Civil War between government forces and anti-Gaddafi forces for control of the town of Brega and its surroundings.

== Background ==
After advancing rapidly along the coast of the Gulf of Sidra in a previous offensive, the rebels were quickly pushed back. They had initially advanced 300 kilometres (190 miles) from Ajdabiya to just 120 kilometres (75 miles) from Gaddafi's hometown of Sirte. However, they were forced to retreat in a government counter-offensive and by 30 March, were back to their starting positions at Ajdabiya, with Brega being retaken by the loyalists that night.

== The battle ==
31 March – In the morning, the rebels counter-attacked Brega in an attempt to push out government forces. The first attack lasted only five minutes before the rebels were in a new retreat following a heavy artillery attack on their positions. By late afternoon, coalition forces had bombed the Libyan army near Brega. Trying to use the air cover provided by the coalition, the rebels attempted a new attack and managed to break into Brega. Street fighting started with gun battles between government forces and rebels throughout the town. By the end of the day, after heavy fighting, government forces had repelled the rebel counter-attack and were again in control of Brega.

1 April – The rebels moved more experienced fighters and heavier weapons to the frontline, though the fighting force was still significantly under-armed and undertrained. In the evening, a coalition air-strike hit a rebel convoy advancing on Brega from Ajdabiya, killing 14 fighters. Also, the loyalist troops successfully ambushed rebels who entered Brega's university complex, where a large number of loyalists were positioned, and the rebels withdrew having lost several men.

2 April – In the early morning, rebels managed to break through the eastern gate of the city. They took control of most of the city before loyalist artillery hit them. By mid-afternoon rebels had retreated from the town and were regrouping at a checkpoint to the east. Later on, the rebels managed once again to enter the town. However, a large number of loyalists were holed up at the university and the rebels were still not able to get into the city center.

3 April – During the morning, the rebels tried to take the university campus and attack the industrial area only to be ambushed. They also came up on roadside mines. The operation led to the bulk of rebel forces retreating 30 to 35 kilometres from the town. Some of the better trained rebels continued fighting on Brega's outskirts locked in skirmishes and artillery duels with loyalist forces in the town. By the end of the day, the battle had come down to a stalemate with the rebels waiting on the road east of the city for more NATO air-strikes on loyalist positions in Brega. However, the few strikes that happened had little to no impact on the situation. According to witnesses, a truck of armed "western" men had arrived at the front line in Brega on the rebels side, raising the possibility that the coalition may be beginning to send in military advisors.

The bulk of loyalist forces was reported to be centered around Brega's university campus, about a mile from the old town, and reluctant to engage the rebels due to exposure to air-strikes. They were instead digging in and acting as Brega's outer defense line, not allowing rebels into the town itself.

4 April – On 4 April, the rebels attempted another push and managed to capture the so-called New Brega, a housing district about 8 kilometres (5.0 miles) from the old town. However, the loyalists still controlled the university and the old town which contains the seaport and industrial districts with the oil refinery. Fighting continued around the university with rebel forces advancing to within 1 kilometre (0.62 miles) before bombardment from loyalist artillery positioned in Old Brega forced them to retreat once again.

Rebels returned later and re-engaged in fighting with two fronts forming – one at the university and one at Brega's industrial complex. Rebels were able to hold on in New Brega district. However, even there, there was still ongoing fighting, with rebels trying to clear out any remaining loyalists. An opposition commander believed that there were 50 carloads worth of Gaddafi's forces still in Brega.

By evening, the rebels were in control of New Brega. Loyalist forces were still positioned at the university and in Old Brega. Residents of New Brega began an evacuation.

5 April – The next day, after a night of fighting, rebels were pushed from inside the town to the outskirts. While the rebels were resting, loyalists used the night cover to take up positions and ambush the rebels in the morning while they were preparing to re-take their frontline positions. The rebels retreated some 5 kilometres (3.1 miles) from the eastern edge of town to re-assemble and prepare for further fighting. While they were regrouping, an eight-vehicle loyalist convoy, approached the rebel's positions. It was hit by air-strikes destroying two vehicles while the rest turned back. An Agence France-Presse reporter and others confirmed there were no bodies found on the site of the air strike. At that point, while the opposition forces were cheered up by the air-strike, loyalist artillery started firing on the rebels which had led them to pull back from Brega in a panicked 20 kilometres (12 miles) long retreat east towards Ajdabiya.

In the afternoon, the rebel Saaiqa 36 Battalion fired Grad rockets at loyalists taking positions in the small village of al-Arbaeen, halfway between Brega and Ajdabiya. During the exchange, four loyalist artillery shells hit a concentration of rebels causing a number of casualties. Later, both an NTC spokesman and Al Jazeera confirmed that following the early-morning artillery-backed counter-attack, loyalist troops had secured the whole of Brega. The next day, a BBC correspondent stated that heavy and accurate shelling from government troops had pushed most of the disorganised and poorly equipped rebel army back to the fringes of Ajdabiya.

6 April – In a continuation of the seesaw battle, rebels regained the outpost of al-Arbaeen, and amassed at the outskirts of Brega in preparation of another attack. CNN reported that the rebels managed to re-take 10 out of 40 kilometres of road between Brega and Ajdabiya they lost the previous day to the loyalists.

7 April – During the night, the rebels brought 17 tanks to the frontline east of Brega. However, in the morning, what appeared to be NATO air-strikes hit rebel positions and destroyed three of them, killing between 10 and 13 rebels and wounding between 14 and 22. Five tanks were also damaged. Following the air-strikes, government troops started an artillery attack on the rebels. This led to another retreat away from Brega.

Later during the day, rebels speculated that the air-strikes may have come from one of Gaddafi's fighter jets small enough to not be picked up on radar. The NTC stated it believed that the cause of the attack was due to Gaddafi's planes evading the no-fly zone. Following the attacks, loyalists chased the rebels to Ajdabiya, and both civilians and some rebels were on the verge of retreating from the city amid rumours Gaddafi's forces were preparing for an attack. By nightfall, Gaddafi's forces advanced to within 40 kilometres (25 miles) of Ajdabiya and were in range to conduct rocket attacks on the city.

== Aftermath ==
By 8 April, most civilians had left Ajdabiya, but rebels regrouped in Ajdabiya which was still in rebel hands, after their forces fled in panic to several different directions near Ajdabiya. NATO acknowledged that it was responsible for the air-strikes on the rebel tanks, but refused to apologise for attack because they "had not been aware that the rebels were now using tanks". During the day, pro-Gaddafi forces used the panic that the NATO air-strike caused to move within 17 to 19 kilometres (11 to 12 mi) from Ajdabiya, putting them once again at its gates, less than two weeks after previously retreating from the town. By the next day, the battle for the city had already started.
