= Brega =

Brega مرسى البريقة
- Town
- Location in Libya
- Coordinates: 30°26′6″N 19°40′1″E
- Country: Libya
- Region: Cyrenaica
- District: Al Wahat
- Elevation: 75 ft (23 m)

Population (2006)
  - Total: 7,000
- Time zone: UTC+2 (EET)

Brega /ˈbreɪɡə/, also known as Mersa Brega or Marsa al-Brega (Arabic: مرسى البريقة Marsā al Burayqah, i.e. "Brega Seaport"), is a complex of several smaller towns, industry installations and education establishments situated in Libya on the Gulf of Sidra, the most southerly point of the Mediterranean Sea. It is located in the former Ajdabiya District, which in 2007 was merged into the Al Wahat District. The town is the center of Libya's second-largest hydro-carbon complex.

During the First Libyan Civil War, the town quickly fell to the Libyan opposition. Government forces attempted to capture the town on 2 March but were repelled; their attack on 13 March was successful, though rebels later recaptured it on 26 March. In April the rebels were again driven out of Brega, and a several-month long stalemate ensued. On 11 August 2011, the rebels claimed they had retaken the eastern part of Brega.

== Geography ==
The assigned settlement near the refinery and oil terminal is known as Brega. The town was built in pre-fabricated concrete parts and designed by Greek architect and urban planner Konstantinos Apostolos Doxiadis. The town has about 7,000 inhabitants.

In reality, Brega consists of several urban settlements, several kilometres apart, mainly divided between Old Brega (or "Western Brega") and New Brega (or "Eastern Brega"). Adjacent to and south-west of the port, equally two kilometres north of the airport, lies "Area 1". Some 6 kilometres to the east, on the other side of the hydro-carbon complex, lies "Area 2". The original settlement of Brega, now partially abandoned, lies some kilometres to the south, to the south of the highway linking western and eastern Libya. 10 kilometres to the north-east of "Area 2" lies "New Brega", a purpose-built residential area for oil workers.

Between "Area 2" and "New Brega" (with much sand between them) lies "Al-Najm University of Technology" ("Bright Star University of Technology"), which was founded in 1981.

Brega lies surrounded by the Sabkhat Ghuzayyil a large, dry region below sea level.

== History ==
=== Battle of Brega (1941) ===
Brega was the location of a brief but important battle in the Western Desert Campaign of the Second World War. On 31 March 1941, during the opening phase of Rommel's first offensive, the German Afrika Korps expelled the British from their partially prepared positions at Marsa Brega. This opened the way for Rommel's drive to the Egyptian border and encirclement of Tobruk.

=== Battles of Brega (2011) ===
During the Libyan Civil War, Brega found itself in the middle of numerous clashes between rebel and loyalist forces, as the front line shifted rapidly in each direction. By the middle of April, the town had changed hands six times in less than two months.

Early on in the uprising, anti-government forces gained control of the town and oil production facilities. Government forces attempted to regain control of the area on 2 March, but were repulsed by the rebels. On 15 March, government forces retook Brega during their initial counter-offensive, as the disorganised rebel forces were crushed by the Loyalist's heavy weapons and air power. On 26 March, after the UN imposed a no-fly zone which removed the threat of Loyalist air attacks, rebels advanced rapidly, taking Brega back from Gaddafi's forces but were quickly forced to retreat after a Loyalist counter-offensive. By 31 March, the frontline had stabilised between Brega and Ajdabiya, with rebel forces launching numerous attacks on the town, which all resulted in hasty retreats. Eventually after pushing the Loyalists back from Ajdabiya, the rebels once again launched an assault on the strategic oil town.

On 16 July 2011, it was reported that the rebels appeared to have taken Brega. However, Reuters later reported ten rebels were killed and 172 wounded, and confirmed that the battle was still ongoing. Rebel radio reports said that after three days of heavy fighting, aided by substantial NATO bombing, rebel units had bypassed the town – cutting off the garrison from its supply lines. Libya's opposition National Transitional Council (NTC) said on 16 July that they were preparing to enter the oil refinery town of Brega "within days", even as they suffered heavy casualties in the offensive. There was heavy NATO bombardment on the morning of 17 July, during which warplanes destroyed a large military vehicle storage area in Tajura, 30 kilometres east of Tripoli, that consisted of several substantial warehouses containing various military vehicles including battle tanks, armoured personnel carriers and ammunition. This was followed by intense street fighting in the town's northeastern area, with the rebels using heavy machine guns. On the morning of 18 July, it was reported that Gaddafi's forces were in full retreat and that the rebels were clearing land mines before securing the entire town. Before midday, the rebels claimed victory in the battle. On 23 July, the rebels were still clearing mines while facing "negligible" resistance from a small remaining force of Gaddafi loyalists.

According to the local council, the eastern part of the town of Brega was controlled by the AGF by 11 August, and by 17 August all three zones of Brega (residential, oil refinery, administrative) were under the control of the AGF. The UN Inter-Agency mission to Brega on 8 September accessed the residential (Old Brega) zone and visited the heavily damaged Al-Najm University of Technology. Population slowly started to return, although most of the inhabitants remained for a while living outside of Brega (i.e. in Ajdabiya) and commuting daily to check on their property and houses.

=== Other events ===
On 13 January 2000, a Short 360 aircraft leased by the Sirte Oil Company crashed 21 kilometres (13 mi) off the coast, resulting in 22 fatalities. The crash is thought to have occurred after the plane's engines were flooded with melting ice, after failure to engage the aircraft's ice protection system.

== Industry ==
The town is the site of an important oil refinery and serves as a major export hub for Libyan oil, being one of five oil terminals in the eastern half of Libya. The oil refinery belongs to and is run by Sirte Oil Company, a subsidiary of the state-owned National Oil Corporation (NOC). Sirte Oil Company is based in Brega. During the 1960s and 1970s, it was run in partnership with the international oil company Esso. By the early 80’s, Esso had left, passing full control over to the Sirte Oil Company.

During the Libyan civil war, oil export and activities at the oil refinery have been brought to a standstill. By the end of February, throughput at the oil terminal had diminished from 90,000 barrels of crude oil daily to a mere 11,000. Many employees at the terminal had left, following rumours that the regime of Muammar Gaddafi was going to bomb the plant.

Brega is the starting point of the 670 km (420 mi) Brega-Khoms Intisar gas pipeline.

== Transportation ==
During Libyan Civil War 2011, Marsa Brega Airport was damaged and inoperable. Marsa Brega Airport resumed operation in December 2013.
