= Zawiya, Libya =

Zawia, Alzawiyah, Zawiyah الزاوية Zawiya
- City
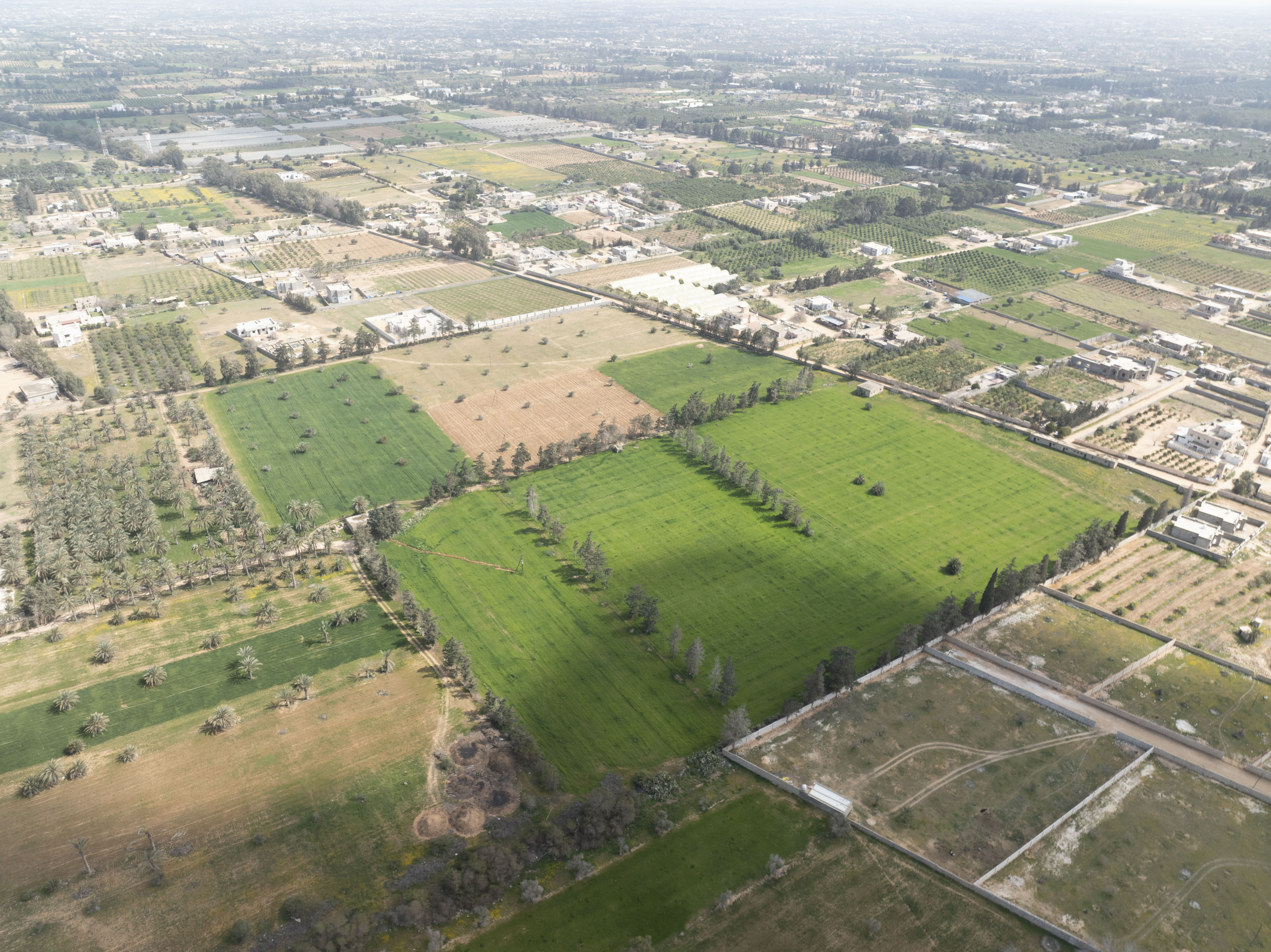
- Nicknames: Phoenix, Capital of Patriotism
- Location in Libya
- Coordinates: 32°45′08″N 12°43′40″E
- Country: Libya
- Region: Tripolitania
- District: Zawiya
- Elevation: 56 ft (17 m)

Population (2011)
  - Total: 200,000
- Time zone: UTC+2 (EET)
- License Plate Code: 4

Zawiya /zɑːˈwiːə/, officially Zawia (Arabic: الزاوية, transliteration: Az Zāwiyaẗ, Italian: Zauia or Zavia, variants: Arabic: الزاوية الغربية Az Zawiyah Al Gharbiyah, Ḩārat az Zāwiyah, Al Ḩārah, El-Hára and Haraf Az Zāwīyah), is a city in northwestern Libya, situated on the Libyan coastline of the Mediterranean Sea about 47 km (29 mi) west of Tripoli, in the historic region of Tripolitania. Zawiya is the capital of the Zawiya District.

== Overview ==
In the Libyan censuses of 1973 and 1984, the city counted about 91,603 inhabitants; it was then – and possibly continues to be today – the fourth largest city in Libya by population (after Tripoli, Benghazi and Misrata). In 2011, Zawiya was estimated to have a population of about 200,000 people, most of whom were concentrated in the city. Zawiya has a university named Al Zawiya University, founded in 1988. There is also an oil field near the city and Zawiya has one of the two most important oil refineries in Libya. Zawiya was the site of some of the fiercest fighting in the first Libyan Civil War, as it controls the vital route between the national capital Tripoli and the Tunisian border.

Historically al zawiyya was built by the abd al nabi Sanhajan who sought refuge of the Hafsid dynasty around 1250 AD and was able to gain small Zawiya as regional ruler along with his descend. Around 1354 AD. His descend abd al mawla extended the religious institution of into Kikla, And was involved in resistance against the Republic of Genoa.

== Climate ==
Zawiya has a hot semi-arid climate (Köppen climate classification BSh).

Climate data for Zawiya
Month	Jan	Feb	Mar	Apr	May	Jun	Jul	Aug	Sep	Oct	Nov	Dec	Year
Mean daily maximum °C (°F)	17.3 (63.1)	18.8 (65.8)	21.3 (70.3)	24.4 (75.9)	26.8 (80.2)	29.5 (85.1)	32.3 (90.1)	33.0 (91.4)	31.4 (88.5)	28.5 (83.3)	23.9 (75.0)	19.0 (66.2)	25.5 (77.9)
Mean daily minimum °C (°F)	6.7 (44.1)	7.7 (45.9)	9.7 (49.5)	12.8 (55.0)	15.3 (59.5)	18.1 (64.6)	19.9 (67.8)	20.8 (69.4)	20.3 (68.5)	17.2 (63.0)	12.4 (54.3)	8.2 (46.8)	14.1 (57.4)
Average precipitation mm (inches)	53 (2.1)	34 (1.3)	23 (0.9)	10 (0.4)	3 (0.1)	1 (0.0)	0 (0)	0 (0)	9 (0.4)	24 (0.9)	34 (1.3)	61 (2.4)	252 (9.9)
Source: Climate-data.org

== Libyan civil war ==
During the first Libyan Civil War, severe fighting between the Libyan opposition and the government of Muammar Gaddafi took place in and around the city. In a phone call specifically aimed at its residents, Gaddafi said the protesters were young people that had been duped into "destruction and sabotage" with drugs and alcohol. On 8 March 2011, it was reported that Gaddafi forces had 'torn the town to ashes', having used air power, and 50 tanks, to destroy the town. According to one witness, "the city is in ruins...everyone on the street is shot on sight." According to another report, regime violence began to escalate on the morning of 6 March 2011, and intensified in the following days – " Children have been shot while sitting in front of their houses, the hospital has been bombarded. I don't know where the injured are going to go."

On 10 March, the city was retaken by pro-Gaddafi forces.

On 18 March, it was reported that protests had once again appeared in the city. By early April 2011, the uprising, having been brutally quashed, the city was " back under Gaddafi's thumb after daring to rise up in his very own backyard." The main mosque that overlooked Martyrs' Square where the injured and dying were treated when Gaddafi's tanks and snipers moved in, had been "completely destroyed, not a trace left." Thousands of Zawiyans had been taken away for questioning in the last few weeks, according to rebel sources. Un-confirmed reports stated that as many as 10 anti-Gaddafi fighters were buried in the town center. After the battle, no trace of the graves or bodies was seen.

Since Gaddafi's troops took control of Zawiya, the revolutionaries have been using guerrilla action against Gaddafi's soldiers. On various occasions rebels have ambushed Gaddafi's men but had to use night cover to prevent detection.

On 11 June, around one hundred rebels infiltrated the city and claimed that they won control of some sections, marking the first significant clashes between loyalist and opposition forces since it was recaptured by Gaddafi's troops in March. Rebel forces closed down a highway that crosses the town, a key expressway for Gaddafi's war effort. The next day, rebels were pushed out of the city by Gaddafi brigades and the road to the city reopened. As of 6 August, rebels had launched an offensive towards Zawiya, and revolutionaries in the city allegedly said they would rise up in support of the rebels when they reached the city.

In early August, anti-Gaddafi forces launched an offensive into the plains surrounding Zawiya reaching the outskirts of the city but not holding positions. On 13 August, amid conflicting reports about the outcome of the latest fighting, Al Jazeera Arabic announced that Gaddafi forces had abandoned Zawiya, and anti-Gaddafi forces had moved in on the same day.

== Sport ==
The multi-purpose stadium, Zawiya Stadium, which is mainly used for football, is located in the city.

== See also ==
- List of cities in Libya
