= Timeline of the 2011 Libyan Civil War and military intervention (19 March – May) =

Map of Libya
- Progress of the Libya civil war. Held by anti-Gaddafi factions by 1 March. (Checkered: Lost before International intervention on 19 March.) Contested areas between March and August. Rebel western coastal offensive in August. Rebel gains by 1 October. Last loyalist pockets. Major campaigns. battles.

The events regarding the military intervention on 19 March can be tracked in the related articles:
Timeline of the 2011 Libyan Civil War before military intervention
Timeline of the 2011 Libyan Civil War and military intervention (June–15 August)
Timeline of the 2011 Libyan Civil War and military intervention (16 August – 23 October)

The Libyan Civil War began on 15 February 2011 as a civil protest and later evolved into a widespread uprising. However, by 19 March, Libyan forces under Colonel Muammar Gaddafi were on the brink of a decisive victory over rebels in Libya's east. That day, leading NATO members acted on United Nations Security Council Resolution 1973 which authorized member states "to take all necessary measures... to protect civilians and civilian populated areas under threat of attack in the Libyan Arab Jamahiriya, including Benghazi, while excluding an occupation force".

Following the implementation of a Libyan no-fly zone, the Battle of Ajdabiya and the Second Battle of Benghazi, the rebels recovered all territory lost in the Gaddafi loyalist offensive. However, due to the bulk of their forces being armed civilians lacking both leadership and communication, they quickly fell into disarray and were forced into retreat.

With NATO attacks increasing in both severity and frequency, numerous defections amongst Gaddafi's military and political elite, and steadily increasing support from the international community, the opposition was able to make limited gains towards the end of May. After being besieged since February, opposition forces pushed loyalist forces out of Misrata and into its outskirts, beginning a battle for control of the area.

Overview map of developments at the Gulf of Sidra. Dates for changes of hand of individual towns are given in red (rebel offensive) and green (government offensive).

Overview map of developments in Tripolitania. Dates for changes of hand of individual towns are given in red (rebel offensive) and green (government offensive).

Overview map of developments in Misrata.

== Start of coalition intervention (19–25 March) ==
=== 19 March ===
- By unanimous vote, Denmark's Parliament authorized direct military action by its air force to help enforce UN Security Council Resolution 1973, marking the only time so far in the state's history that military commitment was supported by full parliamentary unity. Despite the Libyan government's assertion that they were respecting the UN-mandated ceasefire, pro-Gaddafi forces entered the suburbs of Benghazi, and were shelling the city with mortars and artillery.
- Pro-Gaddafi forces were reported in the suburbs of Benghazi and shelling the city with artillery from 20 km (12 mi) away. Pro-Gaddafi tanks inside Benghazi were reported by a BBC News journalist.
- Also on 19 March, a MiG-23BN was shot down over Benghazi by ground fire. A rebel spokesman later confirmed that the plane belonged to the Free Libyan Air Force and had been engaged in error by rebels. Fox News initially reported that the plane was "bombing their (rebels) eastern stronghold".
- The Libyan government said the rebels violated the UN "no fly" resolution by using a helicopter and a fighter jet to bomb Libyan armed forces.
- Libyan state television said that Libyan Interior Minister Abdul Fatah Younis, who had defected to the opposition one month ago, had returned to the government. The head of the Libyan National Council, Mustafa Abdul Jalil, denied this report. On a live phone call with Al Jazeera, Younis confirmed that he was still in Benghazi and on the rebels' side, and that videos of him on state television were from a meeting with Gaddafi months ago.
- At 4 pm (Libyan time), French fighter jets began entering Libyan airspace in reconnaissance missions in support of the Libyan no-fly zone.
- Mohammed Nabbous, founder of Libya Alhurra TV, died in the Second Battle of Benghazi.
- At 6:45 pm local time, a French fighter jet fired the first shots, hitting government military armored vehicles. Al Jazeera reported the next day that the air raid had destroyed a convoy of fourteen tanks and several trucks loaded with RPGs and ammunition, fourteen pro-Gaddafi soldiers were reported dead after the raid.
- According to Al Jazeera, some citizens of Benghazi were leaving the city and moving northwest to other anti-Gaddafi held towns. Later reports from Al Jazeera/Pentagon relations told that American warships had launched cruise missiles at Libyan airfields as part of a multi-phase operation called Odyssey Dawn. After that, the US planned to focus on the skirmishes on the ground. The Pentagon said that the United Arab Emirates and Qatar would also be involved in military operations in Libya, but would announce their involvement themselves.
- Operation Odyssey Dawn, falls under the operational command of the AFRICOM, under General Carter Ham. Tactical execution was being run out of the USS Mount Whitney, Admiral Sam Locklear commanding. Off the coast of Libya, there were: 11 vessels from Italy, 11 from the US (including three submarines, each with 112 missiles on board), one from the UK, one from France and one from Canada.
- Later that day, Gaddafi's Secretary General of the People's Congress, Mohammad al-Zawi, had a press conference in which he repeatedly claimed that the ceasefire was in action, contradictory to reports from Al Jazeera, BBC News and other Western news sources. Libyan state television later claimed that Gaddafi forces had shot down a French military plane.
- The African Union Ad Hoc High-Level Committee on Libya met.

=== 20 March ===
- At about 2:30 am local time, anti-aircraft gunfire was heard for about seven minutes echoing throughout Tripoli; it was unknown what targets were hit. Later, Libya state television reported that airstrikes killed 48 people and wounded 150 in civilian areas. Citing an armed-forces statement, it said Tripoli as well as Benghazi, Misrata and Zuwarah were also hit.
- Libyan armed men on the port of Tripoli captured an Italian ship with eleven crew members – eight from Italy, two from India and one from Ukraine. The ship, the ASSO 22 – belonging to the Augusta Off Shore Society – was sending staff of Eni, an Italian multinational oil-and-gas company, to Libya. It had arrived in Tripoli in the afternoon of 19 March; after the staff departed, the crew was held up by the armed personnel of the port.
- Al Jazeera reported that on 20 March an air strike had destroyed fourteen tanks, twenty armored-troop carriers and several trucks filled with ammunition and rocket-propelled grenades, killing fourteen pro-Gaddafi soldiers in the process. Three of Gaddafi's tanks had just reached the centre of rebel-held Misrata, a spokesman for the armed opposition told Al Jazeera. The same source reported that pro-Gaddhafi boats did not allow help to reach Misrata. Casualties were reported to be too high to count.
- The People's Republic of China, the Russia and the Arab League condemned the violence from the US and France with Russia claiming that the UN Security Council resolution had been "hastily adopted". At about 5:10 pm local time, a health official in Tripoli increased the death toll from forty-eight to sixty-four. More anti-aircraft fire was heard in Tripoli at about 8:30 am local time. At 9:00 pm local time the government once again called for a ceasefire. However, Al Jazeera reporters later questioned the spokesperson for the military, he replied that no one would in the public would be informed of this by media. At 10:26 pm local time a loud explosion was reported nearby Gaddafi's compound, Bab al-Azizia in Tripoli. It was confirmed by CNN that a building at the heart of the Azizia compound had been destroyed.

=== 21 March ===
- It was reported by Al Manara Media, that Khamis Gaddafi, the leader of the Khamis Brigade and Gaddafi's son, had died from his injuries sustained when Muhammad Mokhtar Osman allegedly crashed his plane into Bab al-Azizia a week earlier. However, this was not confirmed by any other independent media. The crashing of the plane had also not been previously reported or confirmed by any other independent media except Al Manara.
- Swiss journalist Gaëtan Vannay, reporting from Zintan in Tripolitania, said the eastern environs of Zintan had seen fighting between rebels and attacking government forces for the past two days. There was heavy shelling on the city by pro-Gaddafi forces.
- Following a meeting with UN Secretary-General Ban Ki-moon, Arab League Secretary-General Amr Moussa stated his support for the no-fly zone being implemented over Libya.
- The BBC News reported that the Libyan Permanent Mission to United Nations was now flying the former Libyan flag and an image of this flag appeared on the mission's official website which had also removed an image of Gaddafi from its index page.
- There were four pro-Gaddafi tanks on the road outside Ajdabiya, which fired on any vehicle that goes over a rise approaching the city.
- Russian Prime Minister Vladimir Putin, stated that the execution of the no-fly zone was comparable to the medieval crusades. Russian President Dmitry Medvedev described Putin's comments as "unacceptable".

=== 22 March ===
- Late 21 March, Al Arabiya quoted a Libyan government official who said administration of Misrata was re-taken by pro-Gaddafi government, however rebels claimed that they still controlled the city. A caller from Misrata to CNN's Anderson Cooper 360° reported that there was still resistance.
- Haaretz reported that the Commander of the International Coalition for Libya stated that civilians were being targeted by pro-Gaddafi forces in Misrata. A Misratan resident told The World Today that pro-Gaddafi forces in Misrata had been ordering people to march to the city square and demonstrate their support for Gaddafi's government and that when an anti-Gaddafi demonstration broke out, the pro-Gaddafi forces fired into the crowd of 4,000 using heavy artillery and snipers, killing twenty-seven people.
- According to the results of a ComRes/ITN poll released on 21 March, one in three Britons agreed with the decision to take military action in Libya. The survey found that 43% disagreed with the action and 22% were unsure. However, a separate survey by YouGov showed the opposite result with a majority of Britons questioned supporting the campaign.
- According to a Guardian reporter embedded with the rebels, coalition forces began bombing Gaddafi forces around Adjabiya.
- A USAF F-15E warplane crashed in Libya; its pilots had minor injuries. One of the pilots was recovered a US V-22 Osprey; the other was found by anti-Gaddafi forces and given shelter. The crash was blamed on mechanical failure.
- In response to Russia's call for an immediate cease fire, US Defense Secretary Robert Gates said, "some Russians were swallowing Muammar Gaddafi's lies about civilian casualties in Libya" and said the coalition forces were doing their best to avoid civilian casualties.
- Hussein el Warfali, commander of the pro-Gaddafi Eagle Brigade in Tripoli, was reported killed.
- Plans by coalition forces to hit Gaddafi's compound with Storm Shadow cruise missiles were aborted after journalists were taken there to show them the damage from the original attack.
- Following an interview with US Secretary of State Hillary Clinton by ABC News, it was reported that "People close to Muammar Gaddafi are reaching out to allies around the world exploring their options". Clinton also stated that she was aware of reports that one of Gaddafi's sons had been killed in non-coalition air strikes but that the "evidence is not sufficient" for her to confirm this.

=== 23 March ===
- Gaddafi's forces launched a heavy bombardment on Zintan.
- Loyalist forces in Misrata captured the main hospital and positioned snipers on its roof. The opposition requested a hospital ship be sent to Misrata.
- Coalition forces launched air strikes on Gaddafi's forces within the city of Misrata itself. Coalition jets also launched air strikes against Gaddafi forces at Ajdabiya's eastern gate. People fleeing the city stated that only the center of the city remained in rebel hands while the outskirts were under government control.
- A British military officer claimed that Libya's air force "no longer exists as a fighting force" due to coalition air strikes and that coalition aircraft are now "operating with impunity" over Libya.
- Libya's pro-democracy fighters formed an "interim government", headed by Mahmoud Jibril.
- Eight explosions from coalition bombings were heard after sunset in eastern Tripoli.

- The Bab Al-Azizia compound was also bombed again.
- Pro-Gaddafi forces re-entered Misrata and attacked its main hospital.

=== 24 March: NATO takes command of naval operations ===
- Fourteen Tomahawk missiles were launched overnight in Libya by the allies, according to a spokesman for the US Africa Command in Germany.
- Fighting in both Ajdabiya and Misrata continued. Tanks re-entered Misrata after previously retreating. The government attempted to capture Misrata's port with naval warships, but witnesses claimed they retreated. The coalition planned to step up air strikes on Ajdabiya and government positions, and was beginning to coordinate with rebels.
- A French fighter, destroyed Libyan pro-Gaddafi Soko G-2 Galeb single-engine military trainer aircraft which was breaking the no-fly zone.
- A member of the opposition forces claimed a major success – killing thirty government snipers in Misrata. He also said that all Libyan government military vessels have abandoned the port.
- The Al Jufra Air Base was bombed by French aircraft. Libyan Deputy Foreign Minister Khaled Kaim stated that the base was struck before dawn.
- A spokesman for the anti-Gaddafi forces said that Gaddafi troops in Ajdabiya were trying to surrender. Col. Ahmad Omar Bani stated that the anti-Gaddafi forces "received information from freedom fighters in Ajdabiya" saying "some Gaddafi fighters have offered to leave their tanks".
- NATO took command of the naval arms embargo.

=== 25 March: NATO takes command of air operations ===
- The United Arab Emirates committed six F-16 and six Mirage fighters to help enforce the no-fly zone over Libya.
- Western warplanes bombed Gaddafi's tanks and artillery in eastern Libya to try to break a battlefield stalemate and help rebels take the strategic town of Ajdabiya. French and British jets bombed targets near Ajdabiya the eastern town overnight, including government forces' artillery.
- Gaddafi was said to be arming volunteers to fight the uprising against his rule.
- CNN reported that Canadian Lt. Gen. Charlie Bouchard was to command the NATO military air and sea operations under the name Operation Unified Protector.
- Abdul Ati al-Obeidi, a former prime-minister of the Gaddafi government, stated that the Gaddafi government was open to talks with the pro-democracy rebels and accept political reforms, possibly including elections.

== Late March rebel offensive (26–28 March) ==
=== 26 March ===
- Rebel forces recaptured Ajdabiya after Gaddafi forces retreated and with little threat also captured Brega; they also advanced towards Ra's Lanuf.
- The outskirts of Misrata were hit by airstrikes.
- Benghazi resident Iman al-Obeidi entered a Tripoli hotel, showed bruises and scars to foreign journalists and stated that she had been sworn at, tied up, urinated on and raped by fifteen pro-Gaddafi security officers, who had detained her for two days (photos:). Pro-Gaddafi security officers assaulted several journalists and removed the woman from the hotel. The security officers said that they were taking al-Obaidi to a hospital. Al-Obaidi said she was being taken to prison. Charles Clover, a journalist with the Financial Times who attempted to defend her from Gaddafi's security forces, was deported from Libya. Clover said that he had been told the night before to leave because of what Libyan government officials said were "inaccuracies in his reporting".
- Bilgasim Al-Ganga, number three in pro-Gaddafi forces, was said to have been detained by anti-Gaddafi forces.
- Gaddafi's forces heavily bombard Misrata, sometimes targeting residences. One family was reported killed by such a blast. Gunners on rooftops shot at anyone who went out onto the street.
- The French army issued its eighth press release on Opération Harmattan where it stated that at least five Soko G-2 Galeb fighter planes and two Mil Mi-24 attack helicopters that were preparing attack in the Az Zintan and Misrata regions were shot down in the last twenty-four hours. They were making further analyses to have a more-precise assessment.

=== 27 March ===
- Rebel fighters took control of the small town of Uqayla and the oil town of Ra's Lanuf.
- They also recaptured Bin Jawad, a hamlet another 50 km (31 mi) to the west as they moved towards Sirte, Gaddafi's hometown. With the capture of Bin Jawad, the rebels regained all the ground in the east they lost to the pro-Gaddafi counter-offensive in the days prior to the imposition of the UN-mandated no-fly zone.
- Rebel forces claimed to advance further along the coast, taking the town of Nofaliya, 100 km (62 mi) from Sirte. Rebels said they planned to halt their advance there overnight as pro-Gaddafi forces were supposedly stationed 50 km (31 mi) down the road ready to defend Sirte.
- NATO said it had agreed to take over command of the military operation that was enforcing UN resolutions on Libya.
- Eight people were killed and twenty-four wounded in Misrata as pro-Gaddafi forces fired mortars while advancing towards the city from the west.
- The rebels signed an oil export deal with Qatar, and announced that shipments of crude would start in "less than a week".

=== 28 March ===
- National Transitional Council spokesman Shamsi Abdul Molah made the incorrect claim that the rebel forces had captured Sirte.
- Pro-Gaddafi troops used Grad multi-rocket launchers to bombard Az Zintan from the north.
- Al Jazeera reported that pro-Gaddafi soldiers in the town of Jalu, some 200 km (120 mi) south of Ajdabiya, surrendered to rebel forces.
- Agence France-Presse reported that the rebels' advance on Sirte had been halted about 137 kilometres (85 miles) from the edge of Sirte by pro-Gaddafi forces. The opposition forces seized Nofaliya and were advancing towards an area called the Red Valley, but found it to be full of mines. Fighting was ongoing near Nofaliya.
- Al Jazeera reported that Qatar became the third state (after France and Portugal) to recognize the NTC as the only official government of Libya.
- Pro-Gaddafi forces heavily bombard Misrata with tank shells and mortars from the north and northwest. Pro-Gaddafi snipers continued to shoot the city's residents. About 4,000 migrant workers, mostly Egyptians, were waiting by Misrata's port to be evacuated.
- By evening, the rebels had advanced to about 50 km (31 mi) from Sirte.
- UK jets bombed ammunition bunkers in southern Libya. The UK Defence Ministry also stated that several tanks and armoured vehicles were also destroyed, including "22 tanks, armoured vehicles and artillery pieces in the vicinity of Ajdabiya and Misrata".

== Second loyalist offensive (29–31 March) ==
=== 29 March ===
- Pro-Gaddafi troops used heavy weaponry to force the rebels to retreat from Nofaliya towards Bin Jawad.
- A US Lockheed P-3 Orion fired on a Libyan 12-meter patrol vessel after it launched missiles at merchant ships in the port of Misrata "to stop them from firing into the port, harming civilians and damaging other vessels". A US A-10 Thunderbolt II also fired on two smaller Libyan vessels traveling with the larger ship, destroying one and forcing the other to be abandoned.
- US Navy Vice Admiral Bill Gortney, US Joint Staff Director, confirmed the US had employed "A-10s and AC-130s over the weekend".
- The mother of Iman al-Obeidi said she had been asked to convince her daughter to retract the allegations in return for her freedom and cash or a new home. "Last night at 3, they called from Gaddafi's compound and asked me to convince my daughter Eman to change what she said, and we will set her free immediately and you can take anything you and your children would ask for," her mother stated.
- Rebels temporarily retreated from Bin Jawad after intense mortar fire, but returned and fighting continued directly west of Bin Jawad, according to the BBC News. Later, it confirmed that the rebels had once again retreated from Bin Jawad, this time some of them as far as Ra's Lanuf.
- The US Defense Department said that coalition forces launched 22 Tomahawk missiles overnight, while flying 115 strike sorties.
- US Secretary of State Clinton and an envoy from the opposition forces held talks in London.

=== 30 March ===
- Forces loyal to Gaddafi recaptured the oil-refinery town of Ra's Lanuf forcing rebels to retreat further to the east. The coalition then began launching air-strikes against Gaddafi's forces around Ra's Lanuf and on the road to Uqayla. Reporters on the ground blamed a sandstorm and low visibility from the air for the lack of air-strikes the previous day. Later during the day, rebels were pulling out of Brega to Ajdabiyah. In the evening, BBC News reported that Brega was in control of pro-Gaddafi forces and Ajdabiya was coming under attack by loyalist troops.
- The UK government expelled five diplomats from the Libyan embassy in London stating that they "could pose a threat" to UK security.
- Rebel forces, suffering a shortage of skilled armored vehicle drivers, sent out an appeal by Free Libya radio for anyone who could drive a T-55 tank to report for duty immediately.
- It was reported that US Central Intelligence Agency and UK MI6 operatives were in Libya to gather intelligence for coalition airstrikes and make contacts with rebel forces.
- The UK government confirmed that the Libyan Foreign Minister, Moussa Koussa, had resigned and defected to the UK.
- The head of intelligence, the oil minister, the secretary of the Libyan General People's Congress and a deputy foreign minister also defected and escaped Libya.

=== 31 March ===
- Explosions reportedly shook an eastern suburb of Tripoli, as warplanes staged a raid on the Libyan capital.
- NATO took sole command of air operations in Libya as US Central Intelligence Agency operatives worked the field to connect with rebel fighters who had seen their advance toward Tripoli halted.
- Rebels counter-attacked against Brega in an attempt to push out Gaddafi's forces. By late afternoon, coalition forces had bombed pro-Gaddafi forces near Brega. BBC Monitoring quoted a privately owned online newspaper, Libya al-Yawm, that Gaddafi's forces had been pushed back to the village of Bishr, west of the city. However, it was confirmed by rebel sources that street fighting was still ongoing in Brega. By the end of the day, pro-Gaddafi forces had repelled the rebel counter-attack and were in firm control of Brega.
- Libyan diplomat Ali Treki fled to Egypt and resigned. Gaddafi spoke out to those like him and called them "traitors", swearing to block their access back to the country once the war is over.
- According to Al Arabiya, Gaddafi's intelligence chief Abu Zayd Durda had fled to Tunisia. There were widespread unconfirmed reports that multiple additional high-level Gaddafi government officials were planning to defect.
- Gaddafi's spokesman, Moussa Ibrahim, downplayed Koussa's defection by claiming that the former minister is "an old man who cannot take the pressure".

== Early April (1–15 April) ==
=== 1 April ===
- Gaddafi's forces intensified their attack on Misrata, using tanks, RPGs and artillery on civilian buildings.
- Rebel forces on the outskirts of Brega were bolstered by the arrival of a number of well-armed, seemingly well-trained soldiers in full military attire. It was not immediately clear where they were from.
- Al Jazeera reported that Swedish lawmakers approved a plan to send up to eight fighter jets and one transport plane to join the NATO-led air operations over Libya.
- Seven civilians died and twenty-five were wounded in a coalition air strike on a pro-Gaddafi convoy in eastern Libya. The strike hit a truck carrying ammunition, and the resulting explosion destroyed two nearby homes.
- NATO airstrikes destroyed a pro-Gaddafi military convoy attempting to enter Misrata.
- Rebels said neither side could claim control of Brega, one of a string of oil towns along the Mediterranean coast that had been taken and retaken by each side in recent weeks. Warplanes flew over Brega, followed by the sound of explosions.
- The Benghazi-based opposition offered a conditional ceasefire, but Gaddafi's government described its terms as "mad", saying it required the Gaddafi government to withdraw troops from cities.
- A rebel convoy near Brega fired into the air with an anti-aircraft gun, perhaps in celebration. A NATO A-10 Thunderbolt II aircraft then returned fire and killed at least thirteen people.

=== 2 April ===
- In the early morning, rebels managed to break through the eastern gate of Brega. They took control of most of the city from loyalist forces before loyalist artillery hit the rebels and by mid-afternoon the opposition forces had retreated from the town and were regrouping at a checkpoint to the east of the city. Later, the rebels managed once again to enter the town and took control of a part of it. However, a large number of Gaddafi's forces were holed up at the university and the rebels were still not able to get into the city center.
- AVAAZ.org created a petition with the goal of convincing Turkey to request the Gaddafi government to free al-Obeidi.
- Libya's rebel council named what it called a "crisis team", including a new armed-forces head, which was to administer parts of the country it was helping in its struggle to topple Gaddafi.
- In Misrata, after weeks of shelling and encirclement, pro-Gaddafi forces appeared to be gradually loosening the rebels' hold there, despite Western air strikes on pro-Gaddafi targets. The rebels said they still controlled the city center and the sea port, but Gaddafi's forces had pushed into the center along the main thoroughfare.

=== 3 April ===
- In the morning, the rebels advanced in an attempt to take Brega's university campus only to be ambushed and came up on roadside mines which led to a rebel retreat 30 to 35 kilometers from the town. Some of the better-trained rebels were still left behind on Brega's outskirts locked in skirmishes and artillery duels with Gaddafi's forces in the town.
- Gaddafi's forces shelled Zintan, southwest of Tripoli.
- Water and electricity shortages worsened in Misrata, particularly on the outskirts of the city. The area near the central-city hospital was bombarded.
- The US agreed to NATO's request for a 48-hour extension of US participation in coalition air strikes against targets in Libya.
- The Chairperson of the African Union traveled to Europe to discuss the Libyan crisis.

=== 4 April ===
- The Chairperson of the African Union was received in London by the Foreign Secretary.
- Libyan rebels again advanced towards the oil town of Brega.
- Backed by coalition airstrikes, revolutionaries pushed back into Brega and were holding the eastern part of the town. Revolutionaries reported that Gaddafi's forces were leaving land mines after withdrawing from the area around Brega's university.
- Italy recognised the interim national council in Benghazi as its "only legitimate interlocutor" in Libya, Foreign Minister Franco Frattini said on Monday.
- In southern Libya, pro-Gaddafi forces attacked oil fields that supply the opposition-held oil terminal in Tobruk.
- A resident of a town in the Jabal al Gharbi area, about 230 kilometres (140 miles) southwest of Tripoli, told Agence France-Presse that Gaddafi's forces fired Grad rockets at the town of Nalut.

=== 5 April ===
- The Turkish Navy intercepted a private ship from Benghazi that was carrying weapons, ammunition, and medical supplies to the people of Misrata. The Turkish navy refused to allow the ship to land at Misrata.
- Rebels pulled back, after a night of fighting, from inside Brega to the outskirts. They re-assembled at the eastern edge to prepare for further fighting. At that point, loyalist artillery started firing on the rebels which led to them pulling back from Brega's outskirts in a panicked retreat. After that, an eight-vehicle military convoy, belonging to Gaddafi's forces, approached the rebel's positions, 30 kilometres (19 miles) east of Brega; it was hit by air strikes destroying two vehicles while the rest turned back. An Agence France-Presse reporter confirmed there were no fatalities among loyalist forces in the attack.
- An Al Jazeera correspondent reported that the defected 36th "AsSaiqa" battalion was attacking from the south of Brega in the desert. They were launching a heavy attack against Gaddafi's forces using Grad missiles. They had managed to push west once more towards the area of Arbaeen which caused Gaddafi's forces to retreat. It was difficult to verify casualties, but four shells landed directly in an area where revolutionaries were congregated earlier. Ambulances were seen rushing to that area and they had not come back since.
- Defected interior minister and Major General Abdul Fatah Younis criticized NATO by saying it was not doing enough, and that "civilians are dying every day". Younis talked about how sewage was being re-routed into water wells in Misrata by Gaddafi's forces, and that water supplies were running desperately short in Misrata.

=== 6 April ===
- Al Jazeera reported that the rebels in Nalut and Zintan entered Yafran and helped their allies there to fight against Gaddafi loyalists. Armed with Kalashnikov rifles, they were able to drive Gaddafi's forces from Yafran.
- An escaped prisoner reported that rebel soldiers captured by pro-Gaddafi forces were being tortured in an underground prison in Sirte.
- There was heavy fighting along the coastal road between Ajdabiya and Brega, Reuters reported. Gaddafi loyalists had been resupplied with ammunition. The rebels were, at that point, some 20 kilometres (12 miles) away from Brega.
- The UK moved four Typhoon jets from policing the Libyan no-fly zone to ground-attack roles following opposition criticism that NATO forces failed to protect Misrata. In a statement, the UK defence ministry said the move aimed at "further bolstering NATO's ground attack capability".
- Rebels and loyalists continued to clash on the Brega–Ajdabiya road.
- During the early morning, a ship carrying 300 migrants from Libya capsized in rough seas off Italy. Survivors told of trying to reach rescue boats as those unable to swim screamed in the darkness and pulled one another under water. There was speculation that 250 people of the 300 died. If confirmed, it would be the deadliest crossing to Italy in recent memory and the worst refugee disaster since a wave of migrants began arriving in Italy in January after popular revolts in Tunisia, Egypt and Libya. The Italian Coast Guard rescued forty-eight people later in the day and a fishing boat picked up three after the vessel began taking on water shortly after 1 a.m.
- The Chairperson of the African Union was received in Rome by Italian Foreign Minister Franco Frattini.

=== 7 April ===
- A Libyan rebel tank convoy was mistakenly hit by a NATO air strike killing thirteen and wounding many. British admiral and NATO commander Russell Harding refused to apologize for this attack, saying that "until yesterday we didn't even know that the rebels possess any tanks", his task was to protect civilians and "it is not our task .. to improve communications with the rebels".
- Following the attack, Gaddafi loyalists chased the rebel forces to Ajdabiya, and both civilians and some rebels were on the verge of retreating from the city amid rumors Gaddafi's forces were preparing for an attack.
- The US might consider putting troops on the ground for a ground offensive, Army General Carter Ham said.
- NATO airstrikes killed two rebels and wounded ten in Brega.

=== 8 April ===
- NATO confirmed it had bombed rebel tanks.
- UNICEF reported, based upon consistent reports from local sources, that pro-Gaddafi snipers in Misrata showed a pattern of indiscriminately targeting children. The Red Cross was sending a team on a boat to Misrata to investigate.
- The US Department of the Treasury announced new sanctions against five senior pro-Gaddafi persons: Baghdadi Mahmudi, Shukri Ghanem, Abdulhafid Zlitni, Tohami Khaled and Bashir Saleh. The US now had personal sanctions in place against sixteen people and had frozen over US$34 billion in overseas assets related to the Gaddafi government.
- Pro-Gaddafi's forces attacked an eastern district of Misrata. After heavy fighting, they were pushed back. Earlier, rebels tried to cut off the main road with big containers in an attempt to isolate the snipers in the city center. However, the loyalists positioned one or two tanks on the main road to counter the rebels' attempt. These tanks were disabled by the rebels, and several of Gaddafi's snipers were killed or captured. Families were seeking refuge in schools and other buildings.

=== 9 April ===
- The International Committee of the Red Cross announced that its 130-cubic-metre relief shipment had arrived in Misrata.
- During the morning, pro-Gaddafi forces shelled the western outskirts of Ajdabiya. A Reuters correspondent reported hearing blasts and machine gun fire for around thirty minutes from the western boundary of the town, which is the gateway to Benghazi.
- Despite the UN no-fly-zone policy, the rebel side used an Mi-24 Hind attack helicopter.
- NATO warplanes intercepted a MiG-23 fighter jet operated by an opposition pilot, forcing him to land after he violated the no-fly zone.
- Several fighters were killed in Misrata; the clashes centered around the road leading to the port. NATO also attacked Gaddafi's forces in several locations.
- There was a meeting of the African Union High-Level Ad Hoc Committee on Libya.

=== 10 April ===
- There was a visit of the African Union High Level Ad Hoc Committee on Libya to Tripoli.
- NATO announced that its Operation Unified Protector destroyed eleven tanks near Ajdabiya and fourteen near Misrata during the day.
- Anti-Gaddafi fighters said NATO airstrikes helped them hold Ajdabiya and drive Gaddafi's forces out during the weekend's attack. They said the loyalist incursion in western Ajdabiya lasted perhaps twenty-four hours and took thirteen civilian lives.
- The BBC News reported that an African Union mission had arrived in Libya to try to negotiate a ceasefire between the rebels and the loyalists.

=== 11 April ===
- NATO announced that its Operation Unified Protector destroyed eleven tanks on 11 April, twenty-five tanks on 10 April and forty-nine since 9 April.
- A rebel spokesman in Misrata said they saw no evidence of a ceasefire. Instead, pro-Gaddafi forces seemed to be stepping up their attack on the city, using Grad rockets for the first time. Intense street fighting continued.
- The BBC News reported that the rebels rejected a peace plan presented by the African Union. The rebels said they were rejecting the truce because it did not include plans for Gaddafi to step down.

=== 12 April ===
- On 12 April, rebel fighters claimed they took position 40 kilometres (25 miles) west of the strategic town of Ajdabiya after clashes with pro-Gaddafi forces that left at least three dead. Pro-Gaddafi forces bombarded the western entrance to Ajdabiya, a witness reported. Eight blasts, apparently from artillery, were heard by the witness.
- Reuters reported that pro-Gaddafi forces had attacked Zintan. The attacks for the most part were random firing from north of the town.
- Reuters also reported that rebels in Misrata repelled two attacks from pro-Gaddafi forces. The fighting was on Tripoli Street, which leads to the city center, and Nak el Theqeel Street, which leads to the city's port.

=== 13 April ===
- NATO conducted air strikes against munitions bunkers 13 kilometres (8.1 miles) from Tripoli.
- The Pentagon said on 13 April that US fighter jets had conducted strikes on Libyan air defenses even after NATO took command over operations in Libya. US Defense Department spokesman Colonel David Lapan said US aircraft had been dropping bombs on Libyan air defenses following the full handover earlier this month to NATO control of the coalition operation there. US officials had previously said that the US was limiting its current role in the operation to support and patrolling of a no-fly zone over Libya. Lapan said the US remained in a support role.

=== 14 April ===
- Pro-Gaddafi forces again pounded Misrata, targeting the port where a medical aid ship was expected to dock and destroying a cement factory and cargo containers, residents said. At least twenty people were killed and more than twenty others were wounded in a dawn attack at the port and a nearby residential area, a medical assistant told CNN.
- Pro-Gaddafi forces fired anti-aircraft guns at NATO warplanes from positions in central Tripoli. Coalition jets appeared to have increased the amount of sorties flown over the capital and could be heard flying over throughout the morning and early afternoon. A NATO strike on Tripoli damaged parts of a university complex. Smoke was also seen on a military base, which was the target of the attack. Several people were injured.
- There was fierce fighting at the front line, halfway between Brega and Ajdabiya. Agence France-Presse reported that a convoy of sixty opposition vehicles came under heavy artillery and mortar fire. They rushed reinforcements to the front line between their territory in the east and the mainly government-held west. The AFP correspondent counted some 100 rebel vehicles heading to the front.
- The leaders of the BRICS nations – Brazil, Russia, India, China and South Africa – believe the situation in Libya should be resolved through diplomatic means, Russian President Medvedev said. "Like the other BRICS nations, Russia is deeply concerned by events in Libya and the civilian deaths there", Medvedev said after a BRICS summit in Sanya, China.

=== 15 April ===
- A ship with nearly 1,200 Asian and African migrants, many in bad shape after weeks with little food or water, left Misrata on Friday for Benghazi, the International Organization for Migration said. The chartered Greek vessel, Ionian Spirit, managed to unload 400 tonnes of aid supplies in Misrata overnight despite shelling on 14 April, the international aid agency said.
- NATO launched three new air strikes in and around Tripoli. They struck a missile battery and two other targets.
- Rebels claimed to have gained control over eastern Brega after heavy clashes.
- NATO strikes hit the area of al-Assah, about 170 kilometres (110 miles) west of Tripoli.
- Pro-Gaddafi forces unleashed heavy shelling on Misrata, pushing troops and tanks into the rebel-held western city, a witness said.
- At the UN, Russia, China and India prevented sanctions from being imposed on Libyan state television.

== Late April (16–30 April) ==
=== 16 April ===
- Al Jazeera reported that there was still fighting going on in Brega, and the previous-day's attack had been repelled with heavy casualties on the opposition side.
- Sirte and Al-Hira were target areas in air strikes by NATO.

Rebel media claimed that:

- Pro-Gaddafi forces launched a Grad rocket attack on an industrial area in Misrata in the morning.
- Rebel forces advanced to the oil town of Brega, hoping to bring engineers to repair damage to the refineries and the terminal. The officer who reported this also attributed the advance to NATO airstrikes. However, by afternoon it was confirmed that the assault was repelled, with rebels not managing to enter the town.

=== 17 April ===
- An Al Jazeera correspondent, from just outside Ajdabiya, reported that pro-Gaddafi troops had outflanked the body of rebel fighters on the edge of Brega and attacked Ajdabiya from the south. A sandstorm stopped NATO from targeting pro-Gaddafi forces, allowing the forces to overturn the rebel advances from the past few days. After a few hours of skirmishes, pro-Gaddafi forces forward units, engaging rebels on the western outskirts of Ajdabiya, pulled back. In the afternoon more than thirty vehicles of rebel reinforcements arrived in Ajdabiya.
- Reuters reported that nearly 4,000 Libyans had fled from the Western Mountains region to Tunisia in the past ten days. "They are in thousands. Hundreds arrived a few minutes ago. They are from several areas including Nalut, Yafran and Rajban," a Tunisian involved in helping Libyans arriving in the southern Tunisian border town of Dehiba said by phone. Residents fled the region because of shelling, fighting and threats by pro-Gaddafi forces.

=== 18 April ===
- The humanitarian situation in Misrata worsened amid more shelling on the city and measures to get medical care were becoming increasingly desperate, an opposition spokesman said.
- The UK Mission to the UN announced that it would help 5,000 people trapped in Misrata "escape the besieged city and will provide vital medical assistance to those who remain in towns across western Libya," intending to evacuate foreign workers from the port.
- Three army officers, including a captain and a colonel defected to Tunisia by boat along with twenty Libyan civilians.
- In anticipation of UN approval for a ground mission in Misrata, the European Union prepared 1,000 troops for the mission.

=== 19 April ===
- UNICEF announced that at least twenty children had been killed in weeks of fighting in Misrata. Many more were injured and traumatized by what they had seen and heard. The deaths and injuries were due to shrapnel from mortar and tanks and bullet wounds. The youngest victim was nine months old and most of the children killed in the past two weeks were younger than ten, a spokeswoman said.
- The UK said it was expanding its presence in Libya with military advisers and the EU said it was prepared to send troops for humanitarian assistance if requested by the UN.

=== 20 April ===
- There was fighting on Misrata's Tripoli Street, but no shelling was taking place, an opposition fighter told Reuters.
- French President Nicolas Sarkozy promised NTC chairman Mustafa Abdul Jalil that France would intensify air strikes on Gaddafi's army. Meanwhile, Italian Defense Minister La Russa, said that Italy would send ten army advisers to aid the rebels in Libya, after France and the UK announced they were also sending officers.
- The US decided to give opposition forces "non-lethal assistance" goods worth US$25 million after assessing their capabilities and intentions. The goods are to be delivered from existing US stocks and comprise "medical supplies, uniforms, boots, tents, personal protective gear, radios" and food.
- Photojournalists Tim Hetherington and Chris Hondros died in Misrata while covering the civil war.
- NTC spokesman Ghoga told a news conference in Benghazi that the council was not opposed to foreign ground forces to protect a safe haven for civilians. "If that (protecting civilians) does not come except through ground forces that will ensure this safe haven, then there is no harm in that at all."
- Heavy mortar fire in Misrata killed at least ten and injured more than 100 others. Seven Libyan civilians and a Ukrainian doctor also died in the most recent fighting, doctors told Reuters, with about 120 people injured.
- Crown Prince Mohammed El Senussi spoke in front of the European Parliament calling for more support for Libya.

=== 21 April ===
- Anti-Gaddafi forces expanded their control over areas of eastern and western parts of Misrata. Fighting subsided compared to previous weeks, while pro-Gaddafi forces continued to shell the city.
- Anti-Gaddafi forces took control of Wazzin on the Tunisian border after overrunning pro-Gaddafi troops. Roughly 100 pro-Gaddafi troops surrendered to Tunisian authorities as anti-Gaddafi forces overran Wazzin. Among the troops were thirteen army officers, including a general. The Tunisian new agency reported that the soldiers had "defected" upon entering Tunisia. However, all of the 100 soldiers returned from Tunisia into Libya the next day.
- US Defense Secretary Gates announced that the US had made two armed Predator drones available to the NATO-led bombing effort.

=== 22 April ===
- Anti-Gaddafi forces managed to clear the center of Misrata from snipers, and secure some vital buildings amidst fighting over the city
- Pro-Gaddafi forces attacked an opposition-held oil pumping station, officials from an oil company said. One witness said eight people were killed in the attack. The attack could delay efforts to restart production from the rebel-controlled Sarir and Messla oil fields, suspended after an earlier raid two weeks ago. The extent of the damage was not yet known.
- A Qatari military aircraft arrived in Tunisia to build an advanced field hospital in the Al-Zahabiyah area, near the border with Libya, to treat people injured in Gaddafi brigades attacks. The plane carried a medical team, the first batch of equipment the hospital, 25 tonnes of medicines, medical supplies and ambulances.
- Pro-Gaddafi forces withdrew from Misrata and claim they will allow the tribal leaders to deal with anti-Gaddafi forces. Meanwhile, NATO continued its air strikes on Tripoli.

=== 23 April ===
- NATO conducted air strikes on Tripoli in the early hours. Agence France-Presse reporters said they heard several explosions after planes flew over, followed by anti-aircraft fire.
- An opposition spokesman in Misrata said the city was freed from pro-Gaddafi's forces on 23 April after a siege of nearly two months. There was no independent confirmation, but pro-Gaddafi troops captured by anti-Gaddafi forces in Misrata said the army had been ordered to retreat and the Libyan government said earlier that local tribes would take over the battle from the army. "Misrata is free, the rebels have won. Of Gaddafi's forces, some are killed and others are running away," anti-Gaddafi-forces spokesman Gemal Salem told Reuters by telephone from the city. He added that while pro-Gaddafi forces had retreated from the city, they were still outside and would be in a position to bombard it.
- Anti-Gaddafi forces started to bring in supplies – through the border crossing at Wazzin – to the towns under siege in the Nafusa Mountains. However, it was confirmed that Yafran had been taken by pro-Gaddafi forces. During the pro-Gaddafi push into Yafran's center, seven anti-Gaddafi troops were killed and eleven were wounded.
- Rebels claimed that air-strikes on pro-Gaddafi's forces located on the Al Zaitoniya – Al Soihat road near Ajdabiya reportedly hit twenty-one army vehicles belonging to pro-Gaddafi's forces. However, there was no independent or NATO confirmation of the claim. On the same day, pro-Gaddafi forces also shelled al-Faluja, a small village near Ajdabiya.

=== 24 April ===
- There was a heavy bombardment of Misrata, according to an opposition spokesman. "Gaddafi's brigades started random bombardment in the early hours of this morning. The bombardment is still going on. They targeted the city centre, mainly Tripoli Street, and three residential areas." NATO planes flew over, but there was no sign of air strikes.
- Pro-Gaddafi forces were stationed in a residential area in Brega in large numbers with around eight Grad batteries. When they tried to secretly surround Ajdabiya, NATO planes attacked them southwest of the city and in Mareer Qabes, an area northwest of the city.
- A NATO airstrike flattened a building inside Gaddafi's Bab al-Azizia compound early Monday, in what a press official from Gaddafi's government said was an attempt on the Libyan leader's life.

=== 25 April ===
- Witnesses said that rocket attacks on Misrata killed at least thirty and wounded sixty. "There is very intense and random shelling on residential areas. Burned bodies are being brought into the hospital," an employee of dissident radio station in Misrata said. "The number of wounded is 60 and there were 30 martyrs. This is the toll for the past 12 hours," he added.
- Four people were killed as pro-Gaddafi forces attacked Zintan with Grad rockets, according to residents. Nine people were wounded in the attack which happened late on 24 April. Pro-Gaddafi forces fired between six and nine rockets, which crashed into homes.
- US officials said the attack on Tripoli, carried out by two Norwegian F16s was intended to degrade 'command and control', the goal was not to assassinate Gaddafi. However, had he been at the site, he would have been a "legitimate target".
- The BBC News reported that Italian Prime Minister Silvio Berlusconi approved the use of Italian aircraft for ground attack missions in Libya as part of Operation Unified Protector.
- The Voice of Russia reported that rebels were growing active in the loyalist-held towns of Yafran, Zliten and Abu Ruwayya, threatening loyalist communication lines into Misrata. Guerrilla attacks were also reported to be occurring in Zawiya, which was occupied by pro-Gaddafi forces in mid-March following the prolonged and bloody First Battle of Zawiya.
- The African Union held a consultative meeting on Libya at the ministerial level.

=== 26 April ===
- The Peace and Security Council of the African Union (AU), at its 275th Meeting, situation in Libya.
- The African Union High Level Ad Hoc Committee on Libya Convenes its Fourth Meeting in Addis Ababa.
- Report of the Chairperson of the Commission on the Activities of the AU High Level Ad Hoc Committee on the Situation in Libya.
- Pro-Gaddafi forces reinforced their position around Brega. They dug in their long-range missile batteries to conceal them from NATO warplanes, according to an opposition commander.
- A ship chartered by the World Food Programme delivered more than 500 metric tonnes of food assistance, three ambulances, medical supplies and other relief items on behalf of humanitarian partners to Misrata. It also offloaded 150 metric tonnes of mixed food including pasta, rice, potatoes; 84 metric tonnes of bottled water; 12 metric tonnes of medicines and three ambulances on behalf of UNICEF, and other international aid organisations. This was the second delivery of the programme.
- It was reported that Russia had said it would not support any UN Security Council resolutions on Libya which could escalate the conflict in Libya. "If a resolution leads to a further escalation of a civil war by any means, including outside intervention, we will not be able to support this", Russian Foreign Minister Sergei Lavrov was quoted as saying by Interfax. Russian Prime Minister Putin had said that the coalition had no mandate to kill Gaddafi.
- Gaddafi's government was circumventing sanctions by importing gasoline from Italian refiner Saras, taking advantage of a loophole in the UN sanctions that permits purchases by companies not on a UN list of banned entities. In early April, a cargo ship sailed from Italy to La Shikhra, Tunisia, where it transferred its load onto a Libyan ship.
- US President Obama authorized US$25 million in non-lethal aid to anti-Gaddafi forces.

=== 27 April ===
- Devastation mounts in Misrata after heavy shelling on port.
- Gaddafi forces have started firing mortar rounds at a district in the west of the city of Misrata, an opposition spokesman said on Wednesday. "They (pro-Gaddafi forces) attacked the Abu Rouia area, in the west of Misrata. They carried out intense bombardment, using mortars", the spokesman, called Safieddin, told Reuters from the city.
- NATO airstrikes killed eleven rebels and wounded two in Misrata.

=== 28 April ===
- The evacuation ship Red Star finally managed to leave the port of Misrata for Benghazi. It had first been prevented from docking and then from leaving as Gaddafi forces continuously shelled the port. The ship was carrying nearly 1,000 migrant workers and 25 seriously injured.
- Loyalist forces re-captured Kufra, the main city in Libya's Kufra District region. There were no reports of casualties in the fighting for the town after the rebels put up only light resistance.
- Gaddafi forces re-captured the Wazzin border crossing with Tunisia after a swift advance in which they pushed the rebels back over the border into Tunisia where the fighting continued on the edge of the Tunisian border town of Dehiba.

=== 29 April ===
- Libyan opposition fighters manned a checkpoint on the road leading out of Ajdabiya westwards toward government-held Brega on Thursday, signaling a possible stalemate in the ongoing conflict for lack of progress by either side. Opposition fighters erected barricades near the western entrance of Ajdabiya, the last major town before Benghazi and the key oil exporting terminal of Tobruk.
- Rebels claimed for a third time in a row to have re-taken the Wazzin border post after a night of heavy fighting. However, Al Jazeera confirmed that the Gaddafi green flag of Libya was still flying over the border post thus proving that government troops were still in control.
- Air strikes hit Gaddafi forces surrounding Zintan.
- Gaddafi forces have bombarded the opposition at the Wazin border crossing. A Tunisian told Reuters that very heavy bombardment was going on and they were trying to retake the crossing.
- Libyan state television threatened that any ship that tried to enter Misrata's port would be attacked, regardless of the justification. It also said that government attacks had rendered the port "non-functional".

=== 30 April ===
- Fighting was shifting to the edges of Misrata, turning small village clinics into trauma centres, witnesses told Al Jazeera.
- Libyan state television says NATO had bombed close to the television building during Gaddafi's speech early on Saturday morning.
- Libyan state media and government officials claimed that Gaddafi's second youngest son, Saif al-Arab Gaddafi, was killed by a NATO air strike on the night of 30 April. Three of Gaddafi's grandchildren were allegedly killed in the same strike.
- Eyewitnesses in the embattled Libyan city of Misrata reported especially intense shelling by pro-Gaddafi forces overnight. "There's been continuous and heavy shelling for three hours straight," said one man, talking to CNN from about five kilometers from Misrata's city center. "There have been a lot of explosions."

== May ==
=== 1 May ===
- Shells fired at the Libyan–Tunisian border near Wazzin land in Tunisia; no casualties were reported.
- Moscow strongly condemned NATO for bombing Gaddafi's complex, stating that its mandate was to "protect, not kill Libyans".
- NATO stated that the Libyan government had no evidence of Saif's death, and furthermore claimed that what the Libyan government had called a "residence" actually held an underground bunker which was used as a command and control center and that was the target.
- The Times of Malta reported its contacts in Misrata said soldiers loyal to Gaddafi had been issued gas masks and were wearing them in and around the city. The report came amidst fears Gaddafi could use chemical weapons to retaliate for his son's reported death.
- The British and Italian embassies came under attack, and this along with general unrest prompted the removal of the British ambassador and UN international staff. An estimated £130,000 worth of art at the UK mission was destroyed. Meanwhile, Gaddafi claimed the building hit in the Saturday strike was not a command center.

=== 2 May ===
- Fighting took place in Western Libya, around Zintan.

=== 3 May ===
- Rebels were low on money and hope for funding from Western powers.

=== 4 May ===
- Agence France-Presse reported that loyalists attacked Misrata's port.

=== 5 May ===
- US Secretary of State Hillary Clinton announced that the Obama administration hoped to free a small portion of the more than $30 billion it had frozen in Libyan assets to support Gaddafi opponents, pending approval from Congress.
- Spain, Denmark and the Netherlands denied rebel claims that their governments recognize the National Transitional Council in lieu of the Libyan Arab Jamahiriya.
- Turkey released a plan hoping for a ceasefire between the warring Libyans. The plan failed to materialize.
- Chairperson of the African Union Commission Dr. Jean Ping presented remarks during a meeting of the International Contact Group on Libya, held in Rome, Italy.

=== 6 May ===
- Amnesty International accused Gaddafi's government of committing war crimes in Misrata by "deliberately targeting and killing civilians".

=== 7 May ===
- Loyalist forces hit the main fuel depot in Misrata on Saturday.
- Forces loyal to Gaddafi attacked the remote eastern oil town of Jalu in the Libyan desert on Saturday, but the town remained in rebel hands, a rebel spokesman said.
- Forces loyal to Gaddafi bombed large fuel storage tanks in Misrata, destroying the tanks and causing a large fire.
- The BBC News reported that loyalist forces had put a number of mines in Misrata.

=== 8 May ===
- The national forum of leaders and dignitaries of the Libyan tribes called for a debate to promulgate a new constitution and described as void all agreements and commitments proposed by the NTC with any foreign country.

=== 11 May ===
- Libyan rebel forces captured Misrata airport after hours of overnight fighting, burning government tanks as loyalist forces retreated.
- The first shipment of non-lethal US aid to the Libyan opposition arrived in Benghazi.
- While human rights organizations warned of indiscriminate attacks in the Nafusa mountains, refugees spoke of kidnappings in the village of Ghezaya which was surrounded by Gaddafi's troops.
- Polish Foreign Affairs Ministers Radoslaw Sikorski, as a first member of the Libya Contact Group, was in Benghazi. During the visit, the Polish government provided medical aid to injured civilians. Sikorski met with representatives of the Interim Transitional National Council, including its chief Mustafa Abdul Jalil.

=== 13 May ===
- Libyan rebels' foreign minister was set to request financial assistance during talks with US officials in Washington, D.C.
- Pressure was mounting on Gaddafi from within his stronghold in Tripoli, with increasing NATO airstrikes and worsening shortages of fuel and goods. An activist said on Friday that there had also been a wave of anti-government protests in several Tripoli neighborhoods that week.
- Gaddafi stated in an audio clip to NATO saying "you cannot kill me".
- A NATO airstrike at dawn killed at least 16 civilians, according to Libya state television, including a group of Muslim religious leaders who were holding a religious ceremony. NATO at first denied any knowledge of the incident, later admitting to striking a building labelled as a command and control bunker.

=== 15 May ===
- Pro Gaddafi forces withdrew from the Misrata which had been under siege for almost three months. Opposition forces declared the battle for the city to be over and advanced to the Dafniya area to the west and the Tawergha area to the east, establishing a defensive perimeter around Misrata .

=== 16 May ===
- Thousands of telecommunications workers vowed to act as human shields against NATO airstrikes targeting communications buildings, which had suffered $1.25 billion in damages.

=== 17 May ===
- Xinhua News Agency reported that the Chief Prosecutor of the International Criminal Court had issued a request for an arrest warrant against Gaddafi for "crimes against humanity".
- Tunisia warned Libya for the second time to prevent its troops from firing towards Tunisia, threatening a diplomatic response from the U.N. Security Council.

=== 18 May ===
- The Canadian government announced the acquisition of 1300 "smart bombs".

=== 19 May ===
- The Economist reported that Jalal al-Digheily, a civilian, had replaced Omar El-Hariri as the NTC's defense minister. The precise date of Digheily's appointment was unclear.

=== 20 May ===
- NATO airstrikes targeted several ships in Tripoli's port, a loyalist asset which had become an increasing threat to the waters off Misrata. Meanwhile, opposition forces battled with Gaddafi forces for control of two major highways in the Nafusa Mountains range.

=== 21 May ===
- NATO launched airstrikes near Gaddafi's complex in Tripoli while a bus carrying foreign journalists was attacked by civilians armed with guns and knives while waiting to refuel at a Tripoli petrol station.

=== 22 May ===
- Though loyalist forces continued to launch attacks and shell the city from its outskirts, opposition forces claimed liberation of Misrata, besieged since February by Gaddafi's troops.

=== 23 May ===
- France and the UK announced plans to use attack helicopters in order to increase NATO's accuracy and ability to strike urban targets.
- The Canadian Press reported that Democrats and Republicans in the US Senate had agreed on a resolution allowing US military intervention in Libya.
- Turkey recognized the NTC as the sole legitimate representative of the Libyan people.

=== 24 May ===
- More than twenty NATO airstrikes hit Tripoli near Gaddhafi's compound in the largest offensive attack on the capital since foreign intervention began. At least three people were reported killed and dozens wounded according to government spokesman Moussa Ibrahim.

=== 25 May ===
- It was announced that South African President Jacob Zuma planned to visit Gaddafi in Tripoli next week to discuss a find a "lasting solution" to the current crisis there. He clarified earlier statements and insisted that the visit was not necessarily to find an "exit strategy" for Gaddafi, sowing doubt as to whether Gaddafi would concede to surrendering power, a demand the NTC had insisted was not negotiable.
- Khaled Kaim, Libya's deputy foreign minister allegedly claimed that the Gaddafi administration saw all options open in future negotiations and that Gaddafi might step down if terms were agreed upon by both sides.

=== 26 May ===
- Gaddafi's prime minister sent letters to foreign governments looking to negotiate a ceasefire in Libya.
- French President Nicolas Sarkozy urged Gaddafi to step down as "all options are open."
- Libya's EU ambassador Hadeiba Hadi defected from the Gaddafi government along with his staff.
- The African Union High-Level Ad Hoc Committee on Libya convened its fifth meeting in Addis Ababa, Ethiopia.
- The chairperson of the African Union Commission met with the UN secretary-general while at the African Union Extraordinary Summit.
- There was a meeting of the High Level Ad Hoc Committee on Libya, at the Level of Heads of States.
- The United Kingdom announced plans to send four Apache helicopters to aid in the conflict.

=== 27 May ===
- NATO allies rejected the most recent Libyan cease-fire offer.
- Russia joined many Western countries' demands for Gaddafi to leave power.
- NATO jets fired on and destroyed the guard towers surrounding Gaddafi's Tripolitanian military complex, Bab al-Azizia.
- A total of 151 sorties were conducted which included 45 strike sorties. Key hits were: in Tripoli: 1 Command & Control Facility. In the vicinity of Sirte: 1 Ammunition Storage Facility. In the vicinity of Mizda: 1 Ammunition Storage Facility. In the vicinity of Misrata: 1 Rocket Launcher, 2 Truck-Mounted Guns. In the vicinity of Hun: 1 Ammunition Storage Facility. In the vicinity of Zintan: 4 Surface-To-Air Missile Launchers.
- As of 27 May, a total of twenty NATO ships were actively patrolling the Central Mediterranean.

=== 29 May ===
- More than 100 tribal and community leaders from Libya met with NTC members at a conference in Istanbul, Turkey on 28 and 29 May. The delegates called for an end to violence in Libya and the departure of Libyan leader Gaddafi and his sons. Most of the tribal leaders gathered were from the large Warfalla clan, based in the region around Bani Walid.

=== 30 May ===
- As many as 120 of Gaddafi's military officials and soldiers were reported to have defected by Libyan UN Ambassador Abdurrahman Shalgam, a former Gaddafi official who joined the opposition. Among the high-ranking officials who defected (which included five generals, two colonels, and a major), General Oun Ali Oun was quoted as saying during a Roman press conference, "There is a lot of killing, genocide...violence against women. No wise, rational person with the minimum of dignity can do what we saw with our eyes and what he asked us to do."
- Al Jazeera reported that "unprecedented protests" occurred in Tripoli. Large demonstrations such as these had previously been limited by the heavy security presence, indicating the growing boldness of the populace of Tripoli. The protesters were eventually dispersed by live fire from security forces.

=== 31 May ===
- Fighting broke out in the pro-Gaddafi stronghold of Bani Walid (see also 29 May) between rebels and Gaddafi soldiers, in which thirteen rebels and three loyalists were killed. Nine of the rebels were killed as prisoners of war, and government forces refused to give the bodies of the dead rebels back to their families.
- It was reported that the UN Humanitarian Coordinator for Libya said that the food supplies in parts of Libya that Gaddafi controlled might run out within weeks causing crisis among the general populace.
- The Libyan government claimed NATO air raids had killed 718 civilians and injured more than 4,000 since the bombing campaign to enforce a no-fly zone began.

== Continuation ==
- For later events, see Timeline of the Libyan civil war and military intervention (June – 15 August), a chronology from 1 June up to 15 August.

== See also ==
- 2011 military intervention in Libya
- 2011 Libyan rebel coastal offensive
- 2011 Nafusa Mountains Campaign
- Arab Spring
- List of modern conflicts in North Africa
