= Timeline of the 2011 Libyan Civil War and military intervention (16 August – 23 October) =

Map of Libya
- Situation as of 20 October.

The events regarding the military intervention on 19 March can be tracked in the related articles:
Timeline of the 2011 Libyan Civil War before military intervention
Timeline of the 2011 Libyan Civil War and military intervention (19 March–May)
Timeline of the 2011 Libyan Civil War and military intervention (June–15 August)

The Libyan Civil War began on 17 February 2011 as a civil protest and later evolved into a widespread uprising. By mid-August, anti-Gaddafi forces effectively supported by a NATO-led international coalition were ascendant in Tripolitania, breaking out of the restive Nafusa Mountains in the south to mount an offensive toward the coast and advancing from Misrata on loyalist-held cities and villages from the north and east.

This period of the war was its endgame, with Muammar Gaddafi's defensive perimeter around Greater Tripoli collapsing and his government ultimately being routed from Tripoli. A number of members of the Gaddafi government were arrested or killed in action, including Gaddafi's youngest son Khamis, and a string of its last outposts teetered and eventually fell under the assault of the (effectively) NATO-backed revolutionaries. By the end of September, the National Transitional Council had won recognition from the United Nations, the Arab League, and the African Union as the legitimate governing authority of Libya, asserting control over the vast majority of the country.

As the war entered its momentous final days, the last remaining stronghold of government loyalists was the city of Sirte, which Gaddafi declared to be the Great Socialist People's Libyan Arab Jamahiriya's new capital after the fall of Tripoli. On 20 October, NTC forces that had been arrayed around the ever-shrinking positions occupied by loyalist holdouts made a decisive push and took control of the city, capturing Gaddafi as he attempted to flee. Gaddafi, who had been seriously wounded prior to his arrest, died in custody less than an hour later.

Overview map of the city of Sirte, with line of control at around 19 October. Green denotes loyalist control, red denotes rebel control.

Overview map of developments in Tripolitania. Dates for changes of hand of individual towns are given in red (rebel offensive) and green (government offensive).

Overview map of developments in Tripoli.

== Mid-August (16–20 August) ==
=== 16 August ===
- UN envoy Abdul Ilah Khatib met with representatives of both Gaddafi's government and the NTC before leaving Tunisia, but said he did not take part in any direct negotiations between the factions. Spokespersons for both the Gaddafi government and the NTC denied face-to-face meetings between the two opposing governments.
- As NTC forces encircled Tripoli, effectively cutting it off, an anonymous Russian diplomat stated that Russia was "deeply disturbed" by the NATO campaign, referring to "the destruction of infrastructure and especially power supplies on territory controlled by the government. In a joint statement, Iranian President Mahmoud Ahmadinejad and Venezuelan President Hugo Chavez went further, denouncing "imperialist aggression" (in both Syria and Libya).
- Gaddafi government spokesman Moussa Ibrahim declared that pro-Gaddafi loyalists had retaken Misrata, a claim reported by the Xinhua News Agency, and the Morning Star. The statement was contradicted by continued reports of continued rebel possession of the city, further pacified due to the capture of Tawergha.
- According to the Associated Press, Gaddafi loyalists still held some thirty percent of Zawiya, using a local hospital as a base and forcing doctors to perform around-the-clock surgeries while snipers were perched on the roof and an anti-aircraft gunner was placed at the entrance; civilian patients and occupants were forced out of most quarters by loyalists in order to make way for wounded soldiers and mercenaries.

=== 17 August ===
- According to Xinhua News Agency, Gaddafi spokesman Moussa Ibrahim claimed that Zawiya and Brega was under full control of the Gaddafi loyalists, denying rebel, NATO and mainstream media reports to the contrary.
- Libyan rebels were in control of seventy percent of Zawiya and had also reached the outskirts of Al-Heisha, they claimed. On the eastern front, rebels said that they had suffered fifteen casualties fighting for Brega.
- A rebel spokesman in the Nafusa Mountains said loyalist forces had abandoned Tiji and Badr and anti-Gaddafi forces had entered both towns.
- Asharq Al-Awsat reported – citing unnamed Libyan sources in Tripoli and Benghazi, Western diplomatic sources in Cairo, Tripoli and Tunis, and vaguely described "Arab sources" – that Gaddafi was suffering from an "incurable illness" and was attempting to negotiate a voluntary exile for himself and his family in South Africa under the protection of South African President Jacob Zuma. The newspaper claimed Gaddafi's chief of staff, Bashir Saleh, had been dispatched to Djerba, Tunisia, and then to Bamako, Mali, to meet with British and French officials about the possibility of Gaddafi being allowed to leave Libya without facing arrest or trial. The report quoted unidentified sources within the NTC as saying, "We do not want the battle to liberate the capital Tripoli to become a massacre, therefore if the price is for [Gaddafi] to leave power safely, then we are prepared to pay this." On Twitter, veteran Guardian correspondent Brian Whitaker expressed scepticism toward the report, calling it "poorly sourced" and suggesting it may be "disinformation".
- Sabratha was reportedly captured by rebels, according to Xinhua News Agency, with the rebel brigade accepting the surrender of fifteen Gaddafi loyalists. This occurred after NATO bombed the Sabratha army barracks occupied by loyalists. Barada TV correspondent Malik al-Abdeh reported that rebels in Sabratha, Sorman and Zawiya formed a joint command to advance on the capital, headquartered from the villa of Khweldi Hameidi.
- According to Al Jazeera, the Associated Press reported that rebels had cut off the oil pipeline between Zawiya and Tripoli. Fighting continued between rebels and loyalists, 100 of the latter being holed up in the refinery which is the source of the pipeline.
- Radio France Internationale reported that eight Chadian nationals, seven alleged mercenaries and one purported "recruiter", were arrested in the Chadian village of Massakory while attempting to cross the border into Libya via Niger in order to fight as mercenaries for Gaddafi. The state prosecutor alleged that the recruiter was offered "a hypothetical promise of FCFA 4 million (€6,100) for each one who crossed the border." This was part of an investigation by Chadian authorities into a suspected underground pipeline for mercenaries between Chad and Libya.
- Toubou tribal fighters reportedly captured Murzuk, a town in southwest Libya.

=== 18 August ===
- Reuters reported that the Zawiya oil refinery had been captured by rebel forces.
- Elsewhere, rebels claimed to have captured Haysha, halfway between Misrata and Sirte.
- Reuters reported that rebels had taken the center of Gharyan, a town 80 kilometres (50 miles) south of Tripoli.
- Rebels claimed they had secured at least ninety percent of the coastal city of Sabratha, and had captured the loyalist military base there.
- A spokesman for the NTC said the southern Brega suburb of Alargop was entirely in rebel hands.

=== 19 August ===
- Zliten was taken by rebel forces, who claimed they pushed beyond the western edge of the city to the outskirts of Khoms.
- The centre of Zawiya, Martyrs Square, was taken by rebel forces after a fierce battle.
- Reuters reported that Abdessalam Jalloud, a former Libyan Prime Minister from 1972 to 1977, defected to rebel-held Zintan.
- The Associated Press reported that rebels claimed that Brega was now completely under rebel control.
- The Libyan embassy in Brasília, Brazil was stormed by protesters supporting the Libyan rebels. The Flag of Libya was torn down and replaced with the National Transitional Council flag. During the protest, there was a reported brawl between protesters and embassy officials.

=== 20 August ===
- The Tunisian Army fought a battle with a group of "unknown Libyans" using armed trucks near Douz, a town in central Tunisia. The Libyans fled after the battle.
- Rebel forces captured the centre of Brega after much fighting.
- Rebel forces captured Zawiya and reached 'Aziziya.
- According to witnesses rebel supporters clashed with pro-Gaddafi security forces in Tripoli amid sustained explosions and gunfire.
- Late on 20 August, rebels inside Tripoli began a general uprising against Gaddafi after a speech by Mahmoud Jibril.

== Battle of Tripoli (21–31 August) ==
=== 21 August ===
- Local rebels launched an assault on the Mitiga International Airport (late on 20/early on 21 August), 8 kilometres (5.0 miles) east of Tripoli's city centre, amidst rumors that Gaddafi had fled.
- From Zawiya, rebel units began a push toward Tripoli from the eastern gate of Zawiya. Fighting was being reported east of Zawiya, particularly in an area known as the 27 km Bridge (east of the town of Al Maya).
- On 20 August, the Associated Press reported that Tunisia had recognised the NTC as "the sole legitimate representative of the Libyan people".
- Celebrations broke out in Benghazi in response to the conflicts in and around Tripoli.
- Rebels were forced to retreat from Al Maya after coming under "very heavy incoming fire" from Loyalist artillery.
- German sources reported that rebels were moving towards Tripoli and Gaddafi had possibly left for the Algerian border. However, Gaddafi denied these claims, saying in an audio message that he will stay in Tripoli "until the end".
- The rebels captured a military barracks, which housed the elite Khamis Brigade, 27 kilometres (17 miles) west of Tripoli, as well as weapons and ammo left behind by retreating loyalists.
- Rebels from the west entered Tripoli's Janzur suburb.
- Rebels took Green Square in Tripoli's city centre with almost no resistance from loyalist forces.
- Agence France-Presse reported of revolutionary forces allegedly to be in control of the Ras Ajdir border crossing in the west.

=== 22 August ===
- South African Foreign Minister Maite Nkoana-Mashabane categorically denied the existence of any South African planes being parked at Tripoli International Airport. The rumour had persisted due to reported sightings of such planes by Tripoli residents.
- Rebels confirmed their capture of Saif al-Islam Gaddafi, who, alongside his father Muammar and intelligence chief Abdullah Senussi, was wanted for trial by the ICC, which confirmed his capture by rebels and initiated negotiations with the NTC regarding his possible transfer to ICC custody.
- Muhammad Gaddafi and Al-Saadi Gaddafi, two other Gaddafi sons, were also reportedly captured and detained by rebels; Muhammad gave a phone interview with Al Jazeera while under house arrest, only for listeners to overhear gunfire inside his residence before the phone cut off. Muhammad, while captured, was reportedly later freed from rebel custody by members of the Khamis Brigade in a gun battle with rebels.
- According to the NTC, only twenty percent of Tripoli remained under pro-Gaddafi rule.
- The government of Niger decided to start air patrols over its border with Libya to avoid infiltration of its territory by armed groups from Libya and the crossing of the border by mercenaries from the Sahel heading to Sabha, and end the smuggling of military elements and resources out of Libya.
- A NATO plane shot down a second Scud missile fired from Sirte.
- The Polish Press Agency reported that unofficially the Polish government could have supplied the rebels with anti-tank rocket launchers and military vehicles "some months ago" and officers of Polish Special Forces were helping in direct operations.
- The Colombian government recognized the NTC as the sole legitimate representative of the Libyan people.
- Saif al-Islam Gaddafi appeared before news reporters in Tripoli that night to dispel the rumours of his capture. The NTC later commented, on Al Jazeera English, that the "escape" probably was due to "inexperienced youth" and a lack of "structured military guard".

=== 23 August ===
- Rebels took control of Ra's Lanuf and advanced towards Bin Jawad and Sirte.
- By the afternoon, Al Jazeera correspondent Zeina Khodr confirmed that rebels were in control of Green Square, now called Martyrs' Square by the rebels. She said that heavy clashes were taking place in Mansoura as well as about 500 metres (1,600 feet) from Bab al-Azizia.
- Later on, an Al Jazeera correspondent said that rebels entered the first gate of Bab al-Azizia, although it is unclear how close the correspondent was to Bab al-Azizia to verify it. Russia Today confirmed the story later with live footage.
- Bab al-Azizia was completely overrun by rebels after defeating loyalists based there, and the opposition flag flew from the main building.
- Despite having gained control of the majority of the Abu Salim district, rebels had yet to reach the Rixos Al Nasr hotel area, where a significant number of Gaddafi loyalists were holding foreign journalists prisoner.
- Gaddafi government spokesman Moussa Ibrahim spoke to a Syrian television station by telephone to say that "[d]espite the presence of NATO gangs in some areas of Tripoli, our military, operational and civilian position is very strong and we are capable of continuing fighting not just for days or weeks, but for months or years."

=== 24 August ===
- Bayardo Arce, the economic adviser of Nicaraguan President Daniel Ortega, said that the Nicaraguan government was considering offering Gaddafi asylum.
- Also, Djibril Bassolé, the foreign minister of Burkina Faso, offered Gaddafi asylum.
- According to Al Jazeera and Reuters, gunfire and tankfire was launched on the rebel-occupied Bab al-Azizia compound from the suburb of Abu Salim in Tripoli.
- French President Sarkozy declared he had invited several countries to talks in Paris on 1 September regarding plans for the future of Libya, including all nations that took part on the conflict and major countries who had taken a neutral stance so far including Brazil, Russia, India and the People's Republic of China.
- Reuters reported that during a live interview with Al Arabiya, General Khalifa Muhammad Ali, the Libyan deputy intelligence chief under Gaddafi, announced his resignation and defection to the opposition forces.

=== 25 August ===
- Four Italian journalists who had been kidnapped the previous day in Zawiyah were freed from a Tripoli apartment building, according to Guido de Sanctis, the Italian consul in Benghazi; two worked for the Corriere della Sera and two others for La Stampa and Avvenire newspapers. The Libyan driver who had been driving them near the city was killed in the kidnapping.
- Rebels launched an offensive against loyalists in Abu Salim district, which rebels believed to be where members of the Gaddafi family were hiding. In the evening, after fierce fighting, rebel forces overrun Abu Salim. Nevertheless, small pockets of resistance remained and loyalist snipers still occupied isolated buildings in neighbouring areas.
- The bullet-ridden bodies of thirty men, believed to be Gaddafi loyalist fighters, were found at a military encampment in central Tripoli, with two of the bodies being bound in handcuffs, potentially marking an execution.
- Al Jazeera reported that rebels gained firm control of the former intelligence-services headquarters in Tripoli.

=== 26 August ===
- Rebels claimed to have gained control of the desert village of Al Wigh near Libya's southern border.
- The NTC officially announced its move of operations to Tripoli.
- The bodies of fifteen loyalist-imprisoned pro-rebel political activists were found at a hospital in Tripoli. The bodies showed evidence of torture and a last-minute mass execution by gunfire.
- Reuters reported that a convoy of six armoured Mercedes cars crossed the border into Algeria near Ghadames, according to the Egyptian Middle East News Agency, citing a rebel military spokesman for the oasis town. There was speculation that the convoy could have been transporting high members of Gaddafi's government including Gaddafi.
- Al Jazeera reported that anti-Gaddafi forces took control of the Ras Ajdir border crossing with Tunisia.

=== 27 August ===
- Al Jazeera reported that late in the day, the NLA finally seized control of Bin Jawad on its push westward toward Sirte.
- The Associated Press reported that Moussa Ibrahim had called AP's world headquarters in New York City, to relay an offer for negotiations between the NTC and Al-Saadi Gaddafi on a "transfer of power".

=== 28 August ===
- An Associated Press reporter confirmed that about 50 charred bodies were at a Tripoli site where a man who purportedly escaped the massacre said pro-Gaddafi troops used hand grenades and guns to kill 130 civilian detainees as anti-Gaddafi forces marched on the city.
- The NTC categorically rejected Ibrahim's offer for negotiations, with a top official saying the NTC "can offer him [Gaddafi] only two things: safety and a fair trial". Mahmoud Shammam said, "We're not talking to him [Gaddafi]. We're going to arrest him."
- NTC Justice Minister Mohammed al-Alagi said the council would not allow any Libyan to be deported to face trial in another country, including Abdelbaset al-Megrahi, the convicted bomber of the 1988 Pan Am Flight 103.

=== 29 August ===
- The Algerian government confirmed that several Gaddafi family members had crossed into Algeria. They were identified as his wife Safia Farkash, his daughter Ayesha Gaddafi and two of his sons Hannibal Muammar Gaddafi and Muhammad Gaddafi, along with their families.
- An Al Jazeera correspondent, reporting live from Nofaliya, a town in the Sirte District, said that anti-Gaddafi forces were in full control of the town after driving out loyalist troops.
- The Italian news agency Agenzia Nazionale Stampa Associata reported that Khamis Gaddafi, Gaddafi's youngest son, had "almost certainly" been killed in a firefight, either by anti-Gaddafi fighters or by an Apache helicopter gunship that fired on a car allegedly carrying him near Tarhuna.
- The NTC warned that if the Algerian government provided asylum to any member of the Gaddafi family, it would be viewed as "an act against the Libyan people".
- Protests broke out in Misrata after reports that Libyan Prime Minister and NTC Chairman Mahmoud Jibril would appoint former Gaddafi army general Albarrani Shkal – suspected of leading the Khamis Brigade in the Battle of Misrata earlier in the year – as Mistrata's head of security. Misrata's local council said that if Shkal was appointed, Misratan fighters would refuse to take orders from the NTC.
- Radio Netherlands Worldwide reported that Agence France-Presse, citing sources in Mali and Niger, reported that hundreds of armed Tuareg mercenaries as well as naturalised Libyan citizens of Malian origin were beginning to return from fighting with Gaddafi's army to their countries of origin, generating fears that a new Sahelian conflict could start if the battle-hardened fighters linked up with Al-Qaeda in the Islamic Maghreb, took up arms against their home governments or clashed with other groups in the region.

=== 30 August ===
- At a press conference in Benghazi, Jalil, the NTC leader, announced a general ultimatum directed at the forces still loyal to Gaddafi, in Sirte and other places. If these forces would not, by 3 September, give a "peaceful indication" of their intention to surrender, "we will decide this manner militarily", he said.

== Rapid National Liberation Army advances (1–23 September) ==
=== 1 September ===
- The NTC extended its ultimatum to pro-Gaddafi forces in Sirte for another week.
- One of Gaddafi's sons, Saif al-Islam, reportedly said he would fight to the death while another, Saadi, was said to be negotiating with the rebels. Gaddafi was reported to have tried to flee to Algeria.

=== 3 September ===
- According to Agence France-Presse, a large military column from the NLA moved to within 20 kilometres (12 miles) of Bani Walid, thought to be Gaddafi's stronghold. Out on a reconnaissance mission, the column saw no trace of the Khamis Brigade, presumed to be positioned in and around the city. The column, 200 vehicles and 600 people strong, entered the hamlet of Wadi Mardum, before turning back to its Misrata base later on the day. The AFP reported there had been no gunfighting, only three arrests of people carrying light weapons.
- In the wake of the expiring ultimatum (see 30 August above) – an ultimatum that was later extended only concerning Sirte – The Daily Telegraph reported that the forces loyal to the NTC were put on stand-by to move on Bani Walid. Furthermore, it said a source close to the NTC had stated that the local tribal leaders had agreed to hand over the town, after forcing pro-Gaddafi troops to leave.

=== 4 September ===
- Al Jazeera English reported that an NTC negotiator, in talks with Bani Walid's local administration, said that negotiations had finally reached a stalemate. He said that the NLA forces positioned around Bani Walid now only waited for a go-ahead from military headquarters, to begin an attack on the city within the coming twenty-four hours.
- Citing documents discovered by a Canadian journalist, the NTC accused Chinese state companies of trying to sell $200 million worth of various weapons, munitions, launchers and munitions on 16 July. Apparently, it had been suggested by the Chinese companies that Algeria and South Africa could play the roles of middle men. A spokesman for the NTC forces, Abdulrahman Busin, said in an interview that "We have hard evidence of deals going on between China and Gaddafi, and we have all the documents to prove it" and added both that rebels had other documents as well (saying "I can think of at least 10 off the top of my head"), and that it would harm relations between NTC-controlled Libya and China.

=== 5 September ===
- Two of Gaddafi's sons, Saif al-Islam and Mutassim Gaddafi, are reported to have left Bani Walid for unknown destinations farther south. Mustafa Abdul Jalil, Head of Libya's interim government said they had been blocking the surrender of Bani Walid (also see 3 September above).
- The rebels claimed Mansour Daw, Gaddafi's chief of security, is reported to have entered the city of Agadez in northern Niger with 10 other people.
- An armed convoy of 200 to 250 vehicles from Libya crossed the border into Niger on 5 September. Quoting unnamed sources, Reuters said this might be a deal between the NTC and Gaddafi brokered by France for Gaddafi to leave Libya. Such a convoy could not have moved safely without the knowledge and agreement of the NATO.
- The foreign minister of Niger, Mohamed Bazoum told the BBC that Gaddafi was not with the convoy.

=== 6 September ===
- NLA claimed that troops advanced 8 km towards Sirte, suffering one fatality in fierce clashes and killing one loyalist and injuring another and lost one rebel. NATO destroyed three loyalist vehicles during the engagement.
- The Attorney General of Brazil blocked the assets of Gaddafi in Banco ABC Brasil and firm ABC Brasil Distribuidora de Títulos e Valores Mobiliários controlled by Central Bank of Libya and Bank ABC, which supported accounts of Gaddafi's government members.

=== 7 September ===
- NTC envoys asked Niger not to allow fugitive loyalists across the border.
- The Pentagon said it had no indication that Gaddafi had left Libya.

=== 8 September ===
- Anti-Gaddafi forces claimed to have taken the Red Valley east of Sirte.

=== 9 September ===
- Niger security sources said that the commander of the southern forces of the Libyan Army, General Ali Kana, and the commander of the Libyan Air Force, General Ali Sharif al-Rifi have fled to Niger.
- Interpol has issued an arrest warrant for Colonel Gaddafi, his son Saif al-Islam Gaddafi and his chief of espionage Abdullah Senussi.
- Anti-Gaddafi forces entered Bani Walid after pro-Gaddafi forces' rocket attack caused a number of casualties.

=== 10 September ===
- NATO struck five times around Bani Walid, where firefights had been taking place. Gaddafi's soldiers were still in the northern and western part of the town of Bani Walid.
- International Monetary Fund recognized the National Council as the only government of Libya and the Group of Eight offered 38 billion dollars to Tunisia, Egypt, Morocco and Jordan to 2013 and 35 billion to Libya.

=== 11 September ===
- Fighting continued in Bani Walid, with some citizens running away from the town. Fighting in Sirte was reported to be taking place too.
- Anti-Gaddafi forces said they arrested Abuzed Omar Dorda, chief of intelligence in Gaddafi's government.
- Leader of the National Transitional Council Mustafa Abdul Jalil arrived in Tripoli for the first time since the Battle of Tripoli.
- Mahmoud Jibril, chairman of the executive board of the National Transitional Council, said that Libya had restarted production of oil.
- Guinea-Bissau Prime Minister Carlos Gomes Júnior offered political asylum to Gaddafi, calling him a "friend of Guinea-Bissau".
- Nigerien Minister of Justice Marou Adamou said that Al-Saadi Gaddafi, one of Muammar Gaddafi's sons, had fled to Niger together with at least eight other Libyans. He claimed that Nigerien forces had "intercepted" the convoy en route to Agadez, but did not explain further.
- The Sunday Telegraph published a report claiming that ethnic cleansing had occurred in Tawergha, with anti-Gaddafi fighters of the Misrata Brigade forcing the town's mostly black inhabitants to leave their homes.

=== 12 September ===
See also Ra's Lanuf raid article

- Pro-Gaddafi forces (reportedly coming from either the west around Sirte or the desert south), deceptively sporting National Transitional Council flags, launched a raid on the Ra's Lanuf oil refinery, resulting in the death of at least 17 anti-Gaddafi forces. At least five loyalist saboteurs were reported having been killed in the clashes, and the loyalists were forced to retreat back west/south.
- Anti-Gaddafi fighters patrolling outside Tripoli discovered four cruise missiles and a missile launcher aimed at the city, Sky News reported. The munitions were evidently left by Gaddafi-loyal forces, and anti-Gaddafi troops expressed concern that other missiles may still be in the hands of holdouts and could be fired against the capital.
- The People's Republic of China recognised the National Transitional Council as the only Libyan government.

=== 14 September ===
- Anti-Gaddafi forces said they were considering resorting to heavy weapons to fight their way into Bani Walid. Civilians to flee the city ahead of the imminent military assault against the estimated 1,200 loyalist troops in the city.
- An NTC Commander said an anti-Gaddafi column 500 strong had captured the military air-base at Brak in south-central Libya, some 50 kilometres north of Sabha. The NTC commander (Ahamda Almagri) also said two Gaddafi loyalists were arrested, while 70 loyalists fled the air-base, the second-largest in the south of Libya.

=== 15 September ===
- Anti-Gaddafi forces mounted an assault against Sirte, but appeared to withdraw after sustaining casualties.

=== 16 September ===
- Anti-Gaddafi forces entered Bani Walid and Sirte, but were pulled back under heavy fire from loyalists.
- Anti-Gaddafi forces took control of Sirte airport and pushed into the city itself. Fighters used rockets to eliminate resistance from heavily armed snipers in houses and on rooftops.
- United Nations Security Council unlocked Libyan petrol companies' accounts, allowed sales of weapons to Libya and allowed the resumption of flights by Libyan officials.
- President of Guinea-Bissau Malam Bacai Sanhá said his country would likely not allow Gaddafi to receive political asylum, as Guinea-Bissau is looking to have favourable bilateral relations with the new Libyan government.

=== 20 September ===
- CNN News reported that NTC forces have captured the airport, the citadel and much of Sabha. Sabha is the largest town in Libyan Sahara and the gateway to countries like Niger and Chad.

=== 22 September ===
- NTC military sources claimed that anti-Gaddafi forces had taken control of Sabha and had captured three oasis towns; Al-Jufra – Hun, Waddan and Sokna. This cuts off an escape route for Gaddafi troops from Sirte and Bani Walid to the southern desert and to Niger.
- The National Liberation Army found two warehouses containing thousands of barrels and plastic bags of yellowcake near Sabha.

== Takeover of Gaddafi's final strongholds (24 September – 23 October) ==
=== 24 September ===
- The NTC claimed that 30 Anti-Gaddafi fighters were killed and another 50 were wounded since the start of the siege at Bani Walid, but other reports put the number closer to 40 dead and more than 120 wounded.

=== 26 September ===
- The main NTC eastern assault body fought their way to 10 kilometers east of Sirte and then reached the outskirts of the city a few hours later.

=== 27 September ===
- The NTC army took control over Sirte's port 2 km to the east of the city proper. One of the members of Sirte's authorities made a contact with NTC's army to offer negotiations.
- The National Transitional Council decided not to create a transitional government until the end of the war.

=== 28 September ===
- It is rumoured Gaddafi was close to Ghadames in far western Libya, Saif al-Islam in Bani Walid, and Moatassim in Sirte.

=== 29 September ===
- A "Tripoli Support Group" has been formed by concerned citizens. More than a month after Tripoli was liberated by militias loyal to the National Transitional Council, hundreds of armed fighters still drive around the streets of the Libyan capital, and anti-aircraft fire and gunshots can still be heard around town. The support group want the armed brigadiers out and a civilian police force in, reports Associated Press.

=== 30 September ===
- The NTC claims to have captured Gaddafi-government spokesperson Moussa Ibrahim outside of Sirte. He was trying to flee dressed as a woman. The claim of Moussa Ibrahim's capture was later proven false. A NTC spokesman Adel Ghulaek described the rumor as a "trick spread by the Gaddafi loyalists."

=== 1 October ===
- For the first time during the siege Red Cross representatives were able to visit Sirte and deliver medical supplies to the city. The situation was described as a dire one. The fighting and NATO airstrikes were preventing people from reaching the hospital and the hospital itself is suffering from a lack of oxygen and fuel for the generator.

=== 3 October ===
- According to two spokesmen from the NTC, the council has already finalized a slate of Cabinet ministers for Libya's new government. The names of those in the new Cabinet are expected to be released soon.

=== 7 October ===
- The BBC reported that NTC forces had taken most of Sirte. However Gaddafi loyalists were still holding out at the Ouagadougou Conference Centre which had become the main focal point of fighting.

=== 9 October ===
- NTC fighters were reported to have taken the Ouagadougou Conference Centre, the university and the main hospital in Sirte. Pro-Gaddafi troops were said to hold only the Gaddafi palace complex, some residential buildings and a hotel near Green Square in the city centre.

=== 11 October ===
- Pro Gaddafi forces in Sirte were reported to be running low on resources to continue their resistance and that many of the loyalists were surrendering, as they were "emaciated, exhausted and defeated".

=== 12 October ===
- It was reported that Mutassim Gaddafi was residing in the al-Dollar area of Sirte and that the entire eastern half of the city was under NTC control, including the main square and the police headquarters. The NTC also claimed that Sirte could fall within days.

=== 13 October ===
- According to Guma el-Gamaty, NTC forces were close to taking Sirte. "Sirte is very very close to being totally liberated. There is still one pocket of resistance right in the heart of the city. This pocket is totally surrounded and it is just a matter of time".

=== 14 October ===
- A small loyalist uprising breaks out in Tripoli, but is quickly crushed by anti-Gaddafi forces.

=== 15 October ===
- NTC forces advance in Sirte seemed to slow down, whilst in Bani Walid, fighting intensified as NTC fighters began to gain more ground, having taken control of the eastern front of the city and besieged the loyalists in the so-called "olive tree region" who were running low on ammunition. NTC commanders on the ground claimed that the "liberation" of the city was imminent.
- At least 3 NTC fighters were killed in clashes in Sirte and 16 others wounded.

=== 16 October ===
- Bani Walid's hospital fell to NTC fighters after heavy clashes. The Al-Gorjoma district in the south of the city was also taken by the NTC forces.
- NTC forces launched a fresh assault in Sirte, using tanks and other heavy weapons in an attempt to dislodge loyalist resistance.

=== 17 October ===
- Anti-Gaddafi forces captured the city of Bani Walid after a six-week siege.

=== 18 October ===
- Within 15 minutes of the beginning of an NTC assault against loyalists in part of Sirte, the NTC forces had suffered 23 injuries in the mid morning battle due gunfire, as well as rocket and mortar attacks.

=== 19 October ===
- NTC forces launched a renewed assault on remaining loyalist forces remaining in Sirte after being pushed back the previous day. NTC forces bombarded Sirte with grad rockets, tank cannons and mortars. Many of the NTC fighters believed that Gaddafi himself may have been hiding in Sirte, judging by the strong resistance they were encountering.

=== 20 October – Gaddafi's capture and death ===
- According to eyewitnesses and reporters, Libya's transitional government soldiers took full control of Sirte, the last major city under Gaddafi loyalists' control. Muammar Gaddafi was captured alive by NTC forces in Sirte but suffered wounds to the head, abdomen, and both legs. He died in custody less than an hour later, while in transit to Misrata.

=== 21 October ===
- There were claims that former intelligence chief Abdullah Senussi had been captured and/or killed, but later reports surfaced suggesting he had escaped to Niger.
- NTC officials in Tripoli agreed to open an investigation into the controversial circumstances surrounding Gaddafi's death.

=== 22 October ===
- With hostilities having come to an end across most of Libya and the NTC ready to declare total victory the next day, victorious former rebel forces began to return to their homes, with brigades from the east of the country entering Benghazi to jubilant crowds.

=== 23 October – Civil war officially ended ===
- At a ceremony in Benghazi, where the revolution had begun eight months before, NTC Chairman Mustafa Abdul Jalil officially declared Libya to be "liberated" and the war to be over.
- Prime Minister Mahmoud Jibril stepped down, fulfilling a promise he had to leave government after the fall of Sirte. He said he believed a new interim government would be constituted within a month.
- Human Rights Watch observers discovered 53 bodies of Gaddafi supporters in Sirte, apparently executed by NTC forces.

=== 31 October ===
- NATO announces the end of its military operations in Libya.

== See also ==
- 2011 military intervention in Libya
- Battle of Tripoli (2011)
- 2011 Libyan rebel coastal offensive
- 2011 Nafusa Mountains Campaign
- Arab Spring
- List of modern conflicts in North Africa
