= Timeline of the 2011 Libyan Civil War and military intervention (June – 15 August) =

Map of Libya
- Held by anti-Gaddafi factions by 1 March. (Checkered: Lost before International intervention on 19 March.) Contested areas between March and August. Rebel western coastal offensive in August. Rebel gains by 1 October. Last loyalist pockets.

The events regarding the military intervention on 19 March can be tracked in the related articles:
Timeline of the 2011 Libyan Civil War before military intervention
Timeline of the 2011 Libyan Civil War and military intervention (19 March–May)
Timeline of the 2011 Libyan Civil War and military intervention (16 August – 23 October)

The 2011 Libyan Civil War began on 17 February 2011 as a civil protest and later evolved into a widespread uprising. After a military intervention led by France, the United Kingdom, and the United States (and later NATO) on 19 March turned the tide of the conflict at the Second Battle of Benghazi, anti-Gaddafi forces regrouped and established control over Misrata and most of the Nafusa Mountains in Tripolitania and much of the eastern region of Cyrenaica. In mid-May, they finally broke an extended siege of Misrata.

This phase of the war saw an extended stalemate on the eastern front, with little movement between Ajdabiya and Brega. However, in the west, anti-Gaddafi fighters advanced from Misrata to seize control of surrounding areas, sacking the rival town of Tawergha as retribution for its support to the Libyan Army and allied mercenary fighters that had committed atrocities against their port city. Fighters in the Nafusa Mountains also became better organized, with Qatari military advisers and increased involvement by the National Transitional Council based in Benghazi helping to train disparate militiamen from Arab and Amazigh villages into something resembling a cohesive fighting force.

The NTC gained critical international recognition from the United States and other states during this period and began to open embassies and diplomatic offices in foreign capitals. But the opposition council was dealt a jarring setback by the murder of top military commander General Abdul Fatah Younis under mysterious circumstances in late July. Despite the muddled situation in the east, by mid-August, anti-Gaddafi units based in the Nafusa Mountains were mounting a bold offensive north toward the Mediterranean Basin.

Overview map of developments in Tripolitania. Dates for changes of hand of individual towns are given in red (rebel offensive) and green (government offensive).

== Stalemate (1–14 June) ==
=== 1 June ===
- NATO extended its mission to enforce U.N. Security Council Resolution 1973 for an additional ninety days. The UN Human Rights Council declared that its fact-finding mission found Gaddafi guilty of war crimes and crimes against humanity.
- Ghanem defected from the Gaddafi administration due to "unbearable violence". Despite uncertainty at first over joining the opposition, he later declared his support to the NTC in a Roman news conference.
- Rebel forces reported that Shakshuk, near the city of Jadu and well within Gaddafi territory, was captured.
- Four car explosions triggered by a hand grenade damaged the Tibesti Hotel in Benghazi, a hotel used by the NTC and residence of many foreign journalists. Despite damage to the hotel, there were no injuries or casualties.

=== 2 June ===
- Cooling international concern, the Libyan opposition has downplayed concerns of oil contract re-negotiation as they meet with the leaders in Libya's oil industry.
- NATO air attacks destroyed ammunition and vehicles depots, a SAM launcher, and a radar installation in the capital.

=== 3 June ===
- Two RAF Apache helicopters attacked a radar site and an armed checkpoint near Brega, the next logical waypoint in the opposition's campaign westward. French Gazelles were reported to have simultaneously been out on mission, marking the first time the helicopters were used by NATO.
- Opposition fighters reportedly liberated the western towns, Qasr el-Haj, Shakshuk, and Bir Ayyad of loyalist forces.

=== 4–5 June ===
- Army Air Corps Apache gunships, launched from HMS Ocean, destroyed several targets near the Brega-Ajdabiya front line including ammunition bunkers and radar installations while the French Gazelles also hit numerous targets around Brega in preparation for the perceived upcoming rebel offensive on the ground.
- Libyan state media was under attack today because they told foreign reporters that a child who was injured in a NATO airstrike sustained her injuries in an unrelated car crash. This information was apparently passed to the foreign reporters in a note, at the hospital where she was situated.
- The Netherlands and Denmark denied recognition of the NTC as the authority of Libya after rebels claimed such.

=== 6 June ===
- The mountain town of Yafran, roughly 100 kilometres (62 miles) southwest of Tripoli, was reported to be under opposition control. Nalut and Zintan were reported to be "relatively quiet" by the opposition, though independent verification of this had not yet been made possible.
- Additionally, NATO airstrikes leveled the offices of Libyan State TV and Gaddafi's military intelligence in Tripoli, though Libyan state authorities claimed only the latter was destroyed. Areas under opposition control reported disruption of state TV broadcasts.
- In order to be knowledgeable of the terrain ahead, opposition forces in Misrata have been training men smuggled out of Zliten while coordinating their efforts with the city's tribal chiefs prior to launching any offensive westward.

=== 7 June ===
- Gaddafi appeared live and vowed to stay in Libya "dead or alive" as NATO launched some of its most destructive airstrikes yet, targeting key loyalist military installations of the Libyan secret police, Revolutionary Guard and Popular Guard.
- Libyan Labour Minister, Al-Amin Manfur, defected and joined the opposition at a meeting of the International Labour Organization in Geneva, Switzerland.
- There are some reports that one of Gaddafi's sons, Mutassim Gaddafi, was killed in an airstrike that was conducted by NATO.
- It was reported on 7 June that Abu-Bakr Yunis Jabr was executed by Gaddafi for refusing to carry out orders to kill protesters. It might be true since Abu-Bakr Yunis Jabr had not appeared on national Libyan television, and there had been no outside communication with him.

=== 8 June ===
- Loyalist forces took advantage of a break in heavy airstrikes to launch a large attack on Misrata as well as Zintan, but did not make any gains.
- Spain announced its designation of the NTC as the sole legitimate government of Libya.
- As International Criminal Court judges debated issuing arrest warrants for Gaddafi and his confederates, the organization's chief prosecutor announced that it had received reliable reports that the Gaddafi administration was buying large quantities of "Viagra-type drugs" in order to encourage soldiers to rape supporters of the opposition.

=== 9 June ===
- Nations supporting the opposition agreed to finance the NTC with over US$1.1 billion as the rebel finance minister announced plans to gradually restore oil exports in the west.
- The US and Australia recognized the NTC as the legitimate interlocutor of Libya, one step below formal diplomatic recognition.
- Opposition forces claimed that over a dozen of Gaddafi's high-ranking military officials defected while rebels in the key mountain city of Zintan attempted to establish control.

=== 10 June ===
- The African Union chairperson participated as Invitee in the third meeting of the International Contact Group on Libya.
- The African Union called for Gaddafi to step down as Mohamed Ould Abdel Aziz, the leader of the AU Libya mediation team announced that Gaddafi "can no longer lead Libya."
- Misrata continued to be bombarded by loyalist forces while clashes between Gaddafi's forces and rebel fighters erupted in the neighboring Zliten. Ghadames, an oasis town bordering Tunisia, was shelled by loyalist forces for the first time.
- The leader of a UN inquiry into human rights violations in Libya expressed his skepticism over any official rape policy by the Gaddafi administration. He cited that alleged statistical evidence was never received by officials and that the allegations were a result of "mass hysteria". The allegations were based on surveys supposedly delivered through the postal system, but it was inoperable during the period it was claimed to have been used. Both loyalist and opposition parties accuse one another of committing war crimes according to the investigation. However, a senior U.N. official defended the validity of the claim, citing "consistent reports from people, from organisations, from UN entities and others on the ground."

=== 11 June ===
- Rebels in Zawiya, a city just 50 kilometres (31 miles) from Tripoli, won control of some sections, marking the first significant clashes between loyalist and opposition forces since it was recaptured by Gaddafi's troops in March. Due to the ongoing fighting, loyalist forces closed down a highway that crosses the town, a key expressway for Gaddafi's war effort. A spokesman for the NTC explained that many of the rebels that fled Zawiya during its fall to Gaddafi in March had been training in the mountains in preparation.
- Rebels reported that two of Gaddafi's sons were in command of the loyalist offensive at Zliten–Misrata front. One of these is Khamis Gaddafi, commander of the Khamis Brigade, a special forces brigade loyal exclusively to Gaddafi and reportedly one of the few loyalist brigades still intact. A day earlier he had been quoted telling his troops, "Take Misurata or I will kill you myself. If you don't take Misrata, we are finished."

=== 12 June ===
- A government spokesman alleged that the rebels were defeated in Zawiya after hours of fighting. A group of foreign reporters were taken from Tripoli to Zawiya for confirmation of the loyalist victory. The reporters confirmed that fighting had ceased throughout the areas they toured though they did not enter the western portion. Only hours earlier, rebels claimed to have surrounded loyalists in the west at three sides. The government further alleged that opposition forces had been pushed out of the city and surrounded on the edge of Zawiya. Reporters were unable to independently verify this, however. This was potentially confirmed when a reporter heard several gunshots west of the city center and a rebel fighter in the town stating that fighting was still taking place.
- A force of 130 rebels attempted to advance on Brega but were repelled and pulled back to Ajdabiya. At least 25 of the opposition fighters were killed and 65 wounded during the offensive, with a rebel commander later claiming many casualties were suffered when loyalist troops feigned a surrender under a white flag, then fired on rebel soldiers as they approached.
- Loyalist forces shelled Zintan from a distance as it remained under rebel control.
- The United Arab Emirates announced its full diplomatic recognition of the NTC as the legitimate government of Libya.

=== 13 June ===
- German Foreign Minister Guido Westerwelle announced that the NTC was "the legitimate representative of the Libyan people," but it was not a full diplomatic recognition.
- Contact with the rebel spokesman in Zawiya, who was updating journalists on the fighting there, had ceased and the highway running through Zawiya toward the Tunisian border was re-opened, indicating that the fighting had stopped and the earlier reports of a rebel defeat were true. Foreign journalists were taken on a tour along the highway, confirming that traffic wasn't being re-routed anymore around Zawiya, as was done at the beginning of the battle.
- Libyan rebel forces advanced from Misrata to within ten kilometers of the neighboring city of Zliten, 160 kilometres (99 miles) east of Tripoli.
- Loyalist troops launched six missile attacks on an oil refinery in Misrata, though the oil storing facilities were reported to not have been damaged.

== Rebel push towards Tripoli (14 June – 15 August) ==
=== 14 June ===
- Loyalist forces fired several Grad rockets which landed within the Tunisian border. No injuries or damage were reported, and it was not immediately clear why this occurred.
- Rebel fighters expelled Gaddafi troops from the town of Kikla, 150 kilometres (93 miles) southwest of Tripoli, and immediately began fortifying their positions. Later reports announced that the opposition had seized the town of Ryayna, 15 kilometres (9.3 miles) of Zintan. Rebels based in Misrata managed to move the front lines several kilometers west, closer to Zliten, after fierce fighting. Despite a renewed rebel offensive towards Brega, negligible progress was made on the eastern front.
- Canada recognized the NTC as Libya's sole legitimate government while Liberia announced it was cutting formal diplomatic relations with the Gaddafi administration.
- The US House of Representatives approved an amendment blocking additional funding for its military operations in Libya, effectively limiting the length of time US forces can continue their operation to two more months, without US Congressional approval of war.

=== 15 June ===
- NATO jets resumed airstrikes on the capital overnight, bombarding it primarily in the east. Additionally, a NATO commander confirmed that warplanes bombed an ammunition store at Waddan in the center of the country.
- Tunisia announced it was ready to recognize the rebels as Libya's sole legitimate government. It gave three reasons for this action: that the shelling of its own people rendered Gaddafi's government illegitimate, that it still resented Gaddafi's support to Tunisian President Zine El Abidine Ben Ali during the ongoing Tunisian revolution which started in December 2010, and that Gaddafi's shelling of its territory had rendered its previous strategy of neutrality ineffective.
- The UN Security Council had its 6,555th meeting and the situation in Libya was discussed. The meeting did not result in any decisions, since the council heard the statement made by the African Union Ad Hoc High-Level Committee on Libya.

=== 17 June ===
- Rebels rejected Gaddafi's proposal to hold elections in three months.
- The Swedish Parliament withdrew three fighter jets and sent marines to Libya. Sweden extended participation in the NATO Libya mission.
- Italy signed an accord with the head of Libya's interim rebel government on Friday to jointly tackle a migration crisis triggered by the violence.

=== 18 June ===
- NATO said Libya was using mosques as shields.

=== 19 June ===
- At least five people died in a NATO air strike that hit a house in Tripoli, Libyan government officials said.
- NATO admitted that it accidentally hit a civilian neighborhood in an airstrike.
- Citing multiple sources, CNN reported that several anti-Gaddafi protests took place in Tripoli on 17 June, with protesters numbering in the hundreds. Pro-Gaddafi forces opened fire on the protesters with live ammunition, resulting in three deaths.

=== 20 June ===
- Rebels claimed to have cut off the supply of crude oil to Zawiya from the Awbari oil field at Rayayna.
- The European Union toughened its sanctions on Gaddafi's government by adding six port authorities controlled by Gaddafi's forces to its asset-freeze list, stating that Gaddafi "had lost all legitimacy to remain in power".
- Gaddafi government officials claimed that NATO killed 19 civilians in the town of Sorman, 70 kilometres (43 miles) west of Tripoli. This came only a day after NATO admitted to accidentally killing civilians in a separate airstrike in Tripoli. NATO stated that the target in Surman was a military command and control node.

=== 21 June ===
- An unmanned NATO MQ-8 helicopter drone crashed due to enemy fire near Zliten while conducting reconnaissance.

=== 23 June ===
- Advancing rebels in the Nafusa Mountains discovered supplies left behind by the fleeing Gaddafi troops, which included Turkish humanitarian food rations which were discovered to have been manufactured in a factory in Turkey after the UN sanctions were in place, casting doubt on Turkey's commitment to the mission. The rations were first found in Shakshuk and then at three other former Gaddafi strongholds.
- Brazilian External Relations Minister Antonio Patriota condemned the ostensible usage of antipersonnel mines by government forces in civilian areas. This was related to the discovery and deadly effect of Brazilian-made land mines upon rebel troops and civilians, even though Brazil, a party to the 1997 Ottawa Treaty, had not legally manufactured or exported antipersonnel land mines since 1989.

=== 24 June ===
- More Libyan soldiers and police officers fled to Tunis by using boats.
- Turkey denied the allegations that it had sent rations to Gaddafi, as did the company whose label was found on the ration packages. The latter suggested that the food may have ended up in the hands of the Libyan government without the company's (UNIFO) knowledge; it furthermore stated that food was "not military" in nature.

=== 25 June ===
- Human-rights organisations cast doubt on claims of mass rape and other abuses perpetrated by forces loyal to Gaddafi, which had been widely used to justify NATO's war in Libya. NATO leaders, opposition groups and the media had produced a stream of stories since 15 February claiming the Gaddafi government had ordered mass rapes, used foreign mercenaries and employed helicopters against civilian protesters. An investigation by Amnesty International failed to find evidence for these human-rights violations and in many cases discredited or cast doubt on them. It also found indications that on several occasions Benghazi rebels appeared to have knowingly made false claims or manufactured evidence. Liesel Gerntholtz, the head of women's rights at Human Rights Watch, which also investigated the charge of mass rape, said: "We have not been able to find evidence."
- Rebels have repeatedly charged that mercenary troops from Central and West Africa had been used against them. Amnesty International found there was no evidence for this. "Those shown to journalists as foreign mercenaries were later quietly released," said Donatella Rovera, senior crisis response adviser for Amnesty, who was in Libya for three months after the start of the uprising. "Most were sub-Saharan migrants working in Libya without documents." Others were not so lucky and were lynched or executed. Rovera found two bodies of migrants in the Benghazi morgue and others were dumped on the outskirts of the city.
- Amnesty International also stated that there was no proof of mass killing of civilians in Libya, which was the basis for NATO's military intervention. Most of the fighting during the first days of the uprising was in Benghazi, where 100 to 110 people were killed, and the city of Bayda, where 59 to 64 were killed, said Amnesty International. Most of these were probably protesters, though some may have obtained weapons. There was no evidence that aircraft or heavy anti-aircraft machine guns were used against crowds. Spent cartridges picked up after protesters were shot at came from Kalashnikovs or similar calibre weapons. The Amnesty International findings confirmed a report by the authoritative International Crisis Group, which found that although the government had a history of brutal repression, there was no question of genocide. It added that "much Western media coverage has from the outset presented a very one-sided view of the logic of events, portraying the protest movement as entirely peaceful and repeatedly suggesting the regime's security forces were unaccountably massacring unarmed demonstrators who presented no security challenge".

=== 26 June ===
- African leaders met in Pretoria, South Africa, to try to come up with a peace proposal. No representatives of the Gaddafi government or of the opposition were present at the talks because the opposition held that Gaddafi must give up his seat before they would take part in any negotiations.
- Opposition troops were believed to have advanced to just north of Bir Ayad near Bir al-Ghanam which is 52 kilometres (32 miles) south of Zawiya, a western gateway to Tripoli.

=== 27 June ===
- The International Criminal Court in The Hague, Netherlands, issued an arrest warrant for Gaddafi, his son Saif al-Islam and his head of intelligence. It was only the second time in the court's history that it had issued an arrest warrant for a sitting head of state.

=== 28 June ===
- Rebels raided a loyalist army base at El Ga'a after it was hit by a NATO bomb. They captured ammunition and other equipment.
- Both Croatia and Bulgaria recognized the NTC as a legitimate representative of the Libyan people.

=== 29 June ===
- The French military confirmed that it had air dropped weapons in June to Libyan rebels fighting in the highlands south of Tripoli, in violation of the UN arms embargo. While key NATO allies were arguing the need to protect civilians set out in UN Resolution 1973 overrides this, the French military was facing criticism for overstepping the resolution, especially from the African Union and Russia.

=== 30 June ===
- British Foreign Secretary William Hague said the UK was offering 5,000 sets of body armor, 6,650 uniforms, 5,000 high-visibility vests and communications equipment to help police protect rebel leaders and international officials.
- The Czech Republic government recognized the NTC as the sole legitimate representative of the Libyan people, and delivered aid to Libyan hospitals.

=== 1 July ===
- Libyan rebels came close to Bir al-Ghanam, but retreated after being met with rocket fire.
- Saif al-Islam Gaddafi, Gaddafi's son, claimed that NATO had offered the government an "under the table" deal that would see the international arrest warrants against both men dropped.
- In an exclusive interview with RT, Saif Gaddafi denied that he or anyone ordered killings of demonstrators in the early days of the uprising. He said that soldiers acted in self-defense as they were attacked by mobs.
- Gaddafi warned Western allies that bombing of houses and offices in Europe would be a "legitimate target" since those are targeted in Libya. Gaddafi's taped message was broadcast to tens of thousands of supporters gathered in Green Square in Tripoli.

=== 2 July ===
- The Daily Telegraph reported that the Sudan People's Armed Forces seized the southern Libyan town of Kufra. Sudanese officials denied this.
- The African Union called for Gaddafi to stay out of Libya talks to end the conflict.
- Heavy shelling fell on Misrata and Dafniya, where fighting wounded eleven rebels.
- NATO confirms it has been ramping up its airstrikes on military targets in western Libya in recent days, bombing Tripoli and Gharyan, a city about 113 km (70 mi) south of Tripoli, and armored vehicles in Bir al-Ghanam.

=== 3 July ===
- Libya rebels braced for a new push to Tripoli.

=== 5 July ===
- Pro-Gaddafi troops stated that they have captured a shipment of Qatari weapons that were headed to rebels by boat.
- NTC Minister of Defence Jalal al-Digheily reportedly met with the Qatar Armed Forces chief of staff in Doha, Qatar.

=== 6 July ===
- Rebel fighters took the village of Al-Qawalish which is about 90 kilometres (56 miles) south of Tripoli. That brought the opposition to within 30 kilometres (19 miles) from Gharyan, the strategic garrison town of held by Gaddafi's troops and which dominates the main north–south road between Tripoli and the Sahara desert. The rebels claimed that Gaddafi was storing weapons in the Sahara desert and recruiting fighters from neighbouring countries there.

=== 7 July ===
- Russian Foreign Minister Sergey Lavrov said there cannot be a quick outcome in Libya and that will lead to many casualties on both sides.
- Chinese diplomat Chen Xiaodong, in charge of North African affairs at the Foreign Ministry of the People's Republic of China, met NTC members in Benghazi.

=== 8 July ===
- Gaddafi issued another audio message broadcast through state television, exclaiming that NATO, the rebels and others who oppose his rule will be trampled "under the feet of the Libyan masses", and also repeated his threats of violence against NATO member states in Europe, saying that "Hundreds of Libyans will martyr in Europe. I told you it is eye for an eye and tooth for a tooth." Celebratory gunfire was heard in Tripoli following the broadcast.
- NATO head Rasmussen told the Associated Press that progress was being made, but that political progress would be needed as well because "there is no military solution to the conflict solely."
- NATO launched at least four bombs targeted against pro-Gaddafi forces in the Western Mountains, some 3 kilometres (1.9 miles) east of the village of Al-Qawalish.
- Poland officially opened diplomatic ties with the NTC by installing its ambassador in Benghazi.
- Five Libyan rebels were killed and 17 wounded during fighting in Misrata.
- Human Rights Watch (HRW) issued a report accusing the Gaddafi government of laying "at least three minefields containing antipersonnel and antivehicle landmines" in areas of civilian traffic near al-Qawalish; in particular, two of the minefields were placed on a dirt road leading to an outskirts Boy Scout building located west of al-Qawalish. The HRW also cited rebels clearing up some 240 Brazilian-made T-AB-1 antipersonnel mines and 46 Chinese-made Type-72SP anti-vehicle mines from the sites since 6 July. Steve Goose, HRW arms director, said "The government's blatant disregard for the safety of its civilians is shameful", and that "Landmines are a weapon that will claim civilian limbs and lives for years to come".

=== 9 July ===
- Four boats with 1,401 migrants from Libya landed on the Italian island of Lampedusa. Agenzia Nazionale Stampa Associata reported that Italian Prime Minister Silvio Berlusconi cancelled his planned visit to the island.
- A petro-chemical plant in Brega was destroyed by government troops, according to Ahmed Bani, refuting earlier allegations of rebel involvement in the destruction of the plant.

=== 10 July ===
- One rebel was killed and thirty-two wounded during an attempted rebel advance upon Zliten. The casualties resulted from land mines laid by retreating troops in the neighbourhood of Suq al-Thulatha.
- Pro-Gaddafi forces launched a counter-attack on al-Qawalish with the launching of half a dozen Grad rockets into the hamlet. Rebels replied with anti-tank fire.
- Egypt ended its unrestricted immigration policy for Libyan nationals traversing the border or airspace between the two countries.

=== 11 July ===
- Israeli television channel Arutz Sheva reported that Gaddafi was bracing for an assault by rebel fighters who had broken out in the Nusafa Mountain region. According to its report, Gaddafi had armed huge numbers of civilians in strategic towns overlooking Tripoli and planned to remain firmly ensconced.

=== 12 July ===
- After contacting Gaddafi, Paris officials stated that Gaddafi is "prepared to leave".
- The French National Assembly voted overwhelmingly for further funding of NATO operations in Libya, with 482 deputies voting in favour and 27 against. The vote, while required, was a formality, according to Al Jazeera.
- An airstrip laid out along a stretch of highway near Rhebat in the Nafusa Mountains was opened by a senior NTC minister, allowing an air connection via a small private company, Air Libya, between Benghazi and the Amazigh rebels.

=== 13 July ===
- The HWR criticized rebel treatment of civilian populations in the towns of al-Awaniya, Rayayinah, Zawiyat al-Bagul and al-Qawalish. Fred Abrahams, a special advisor for the HRW's program office, stated that "We documented fairly widespread looting of homes and shops, the burning of some homes of suspected Gaddafi supporters and – most disturbingly – the vandalisation of three medical clinics [and] local small hospitals, including the theft of some of the medical equipment." Rebel spokesman Mahmoud Jibril denied the allegations of civilian abuse, but a rebel commander in the Nafusa Mountains admitted some abuses had taken place, going on to say such attacks violated orders and some of those responsible had been punished.
- Pro-Gaddafi forces launched a counter-attack on towns in Jabal al Gharbi District, causing the rebels to retreat from al-Qawalish. By the evening, the rebels counter-attacked and after a five-hour battle they retook the village and chased loyalist forces to the outskirts of Asbi'a. During the fighting, two rebels were killed and 17 wounded.

=== 14 July ===
- Russia's special representative for Africa Mikhail Margelov reported that Baghdadi Mahmudi told Margelov of a plan to "cover [Tripoli] with missiles and blow it up" if Tripoli was seized by the rebels.
- Opposition forces armed with both light and heavy weapons, including tanks, armoured personnel carriers and technicals attempted to retake Brega.
- The Democratic Party (Libya) was founded in London.

=== 15 July ===
- Japan and the US formally recognized the NTC as sole legitimate representative of Libya.
- The Libya Contact Group recognised the NTC as the only legitimate governing body of Libya at a meeting in Istanbul. They noted that the Gaddafi government no longer had any legitimate authority in Libya and they recommended that certain members of his family should go. The Libya Contact Group includes over forty countries, the European Union, the African Union, the UN, the Arab League, the Gulf Cooperation Council and the Organisation of Islamic Cooperation.
- Gaddafi stated, in an audio message, that the recognition of the "so-called" NTC was insignificant and that the fight against the "colonial aggression" would continue. His speech was broadcast in front of thousands of supporters gathered on the main square in Zliten, around 150 kilometres (93 miles) east of Tripoli and less than an hour drive from rebel-held Misrata.

=== 16 July ===
- The rebel forces fought Gaddafi forces on the outskirts of Brega, suffering heavy casualties. At least 12 rebels were killed and 178 wounded.

=== 18 July ===
- The NTC claimed rebels took much of Brega and pro-Gaddafi forces were in retreat towards Ra's Lanuf. Between 150 and 200 loyalist troops reportedly remained in the town as rebels attempted to both clear them out and dismantle land mines. The government in Tripoli denied Brega had fallen, with spokesman Moussa Ibrahim telling a CNN reporter, "We will turn Brega into hell. We will not give Brega up, even if this causes the death of thousands of rebels and the destruction of the whole city."

=== 19 July ===
- The media reported that though the majority of Gaddafi's troops had retreated toward Ra's Lanuf, opposition fighters in Brega were still taking casualties from loyalist holdouts, landmines, and artillery directed against the western outskirts of the port city. An NTC spokesman admitted that it would likely take at least ten more days for the anti-Gaddafi forces to secure Brega and its environs. Later in the evening, opposition commanders said they had withdrawn forces from Brega under artillery fire to aid in disarming minefields east of the city. They claimed to control about one-third of Brega, including the residential area of New Brega, but did not hold the port.
- Al Jazeera reported that tens of thousands of Gaddafi's supporters rallied in 'Aziziya, 40 kilometres (25 miles) southwest of Tripoli. Waving the green flags and chanting "Only God, Muammar and Libya" the supporters gathered in the town main square.

=== 20 July ===
- The Wall Street Journal reported the opening of a new front in southwestern Libya near the desert city of Sabha, where opposition fighters operating out of Kufra allegedly captured a small village to the south and were reportedly preparing to advance on Sabha itself.
- Even as the rebel offensive toward Brega was hampered by shelling and booby traps, anti-Gaddafi forces advanced to within 1.5 kilometres (0.93 miles) of Zliten, opposition sources said.
- NTC Defence Minister Jalal al-Digheily visited Nalut to tour the Nafusa Mountains front and tout the alliance between Arab and Amazigh fighters in the region.

=== 21 July ===
- In heavy fighting near Zliten, the rebels reportedly captured a loyalist general of the Hamza Brigade, Gen. Abdul Nabih Zayed.
- NTC Prime Minister Mahmoud Jibril said he had credible information that Gaddafi loyalists have rigged oil facilities in Brega to explode if the Libyan Army was forced to abandon the town. Opposition fighters continued to work to disarm mines and booby-traps planted in and around Brega.
- Gaddafi ruled out talks with the opposition fighters seeking to end his forty-one-year-rule, but a spokesman from his government has not ruled out dialogue with the US. "There will be no talks between me and them until Judgment Day," Gaddafi told a crowd of thousands of his supporters in his home city of Sirte in a remotely delivered audio message.
- The Libyan government said that NATO air strikes targeted civilian sites in Zliten. Foreign media were shown destroyed buildings and wounded civilians in the town.

=== 22 July ===
- A US State Department spokesman said the US government was looking into allegations by rebels in western Libya that on 19 July, Algeria allowed a Libyan-flagged ship loaded with weapons to dock in the Algerian port of Djen Djen, then shipped those weapons overland to Libya for use by Gaddafi's troops. The spokesman said that if true, this action would place Algeria in violation of UNSCR 1970 and UNSCR 1973, which forbid arms trafficking to the Libyan Arab Jamahiriya. There was evidence that Qatar had been sending crates of ammunition along with humanitarian supplies, although Al Jazeera stated that they were "unable to find out if they were for the Qatari security forces to use or the rebels".

=== 23 July ===
- Loyalist forces recaptured Qatrun in the southern Libyan Desert, forcing Toubou tribesmen allied with the National Liberation Army (NLA) to retreat south of the town.
- Several thousand people gathered in the centre of Sirte, Gaddafi's hometown, during another of a series of pro-Gaddafi rallies in the past weeks to show support to Gaddafi.

=== 24 July ===
- Germany began offering loans of up to $144 million to the NTC to help with humanitarian needs and rebuilding. Guido Westerwelle announced that his country is giving out loans, because Gaddafi's frozen assets cannot be released at the time.
- NATO war planes destroyed two command and control nodes, two surface-to-air missile launchers, and one anti-aircraft gun in Tripoli; while rebels also repulsed a counter-attack, by loyalist forces in the southwest.
- It was reported that the Libyan opposition forces had repelled an offensive by government troops in the town of Qwalish. Sunday's attack was aimed at recapturing the strategic desert town, southwest Tripoli. Witnesses said dozens of civilians were sent to the area just before the attack. Opposition fighters seized control of the region earlier this month.

=== 25 July ===
- Reuters reported that a group of Libyan diplomats and staff stormed the Libyan embassy in Sofia, Bulgaria, smashing statues and portraits of Gaddafi and declaring the embassy under the control of the opposition forces. Footage from private Bulgarian television station, bTV, showed several opposition supporters taking down the Libyan flag and smashing a bust of Gaddafi to pieces in the embassy's yard. The group detained the charge d'affairs of the embassy and his secretary, who declined to denounce the Libyan leader. The two were later allowed to leave, Reuters said, citing bTV.

=== 26 July ===
- The pro-Gaddafi government would not agree to negotiations while NATO airstrikes are ongoing, said Baghdadi Mahmudi, prime minister of the Libyan Arab Jamahiriya, after meeting with a UN envoy. He also said that Gaddafi could not be asked to leave power or quit Libya.
- CNN reported that NATO warplanes had struck a health clinic, a food-storage complex and a military base in Zliten, allegedly killing at least 11 civilians. The video report also shows ruins of a mosque and school located on the outskirts of the city which were destroyed by air strikes. NATO later issued a statement where they rejected claims that they have hit non-military targets near the coastal city, claiming instead to have hit a command and control node and a vehicle storage facility.

=== 27 July ===
- The Financial Times reported several cases of officials in Gaddafi's government "manicuring the facts". One example was a house in Zliten that government officials claimed was bombed by NATO warplanes and had no military use. However, a man was hastily trying to hide a soldier's green helmet and army uniforms there. Another building was claimed by officials to have been used by a Turkish road construction company but there was graffiti on the walls that appeared to have been written by Libyan soldiers using it as a military base. One night at Tripoli's port, a Gaddafi government minder pointed out a ship in flames in the dark and claimed it was a private yacht. The next morning, in the light of day, it was clear the burning vessel was a frigate.

=== 28 July ===
- Opposition forces in the Nafusa Mountains began an assault on Gaddafi forces in the towns of al-Jawsh and Ghazaya. They announced the capture of Ghazaya several hours later.
- General Abdul Fatah Younis, top commander of the rebel forces, was arrested as some on the NTC questioned his loyalty. His assassination, allegedly en route to detention in Benghazi, was later announced by the NTC. A man was arrested in connection with the murder.

=== 29 July ===
- The body of Younis, shot and burned before being dumped outside Benghazi, was recovered and a funeral was held.
- Suleiman Mahmoud was named to succeed Younis as the rebels' top commander.
- In protest over Younis's death and the NTC's handling of the incident, the local committee and military commander in Misrata declared they would ignore orders from Benghazi.
- Finance Minister Ali Tarhouni, a prominent member of the NTC, said the suspect arrested in connection with the Younis's assassination was a rebel militia leader whom the NTC had dispatched to arrest Younis and bring him back to Benghazi. Tarhouni said that the militia commander, whose name was not made public, claimed he was unable to stop his subordinates from shooting Younis and two of his aides instead of escorting them back to Benghazi as ordered. This account generally conformed to the claims of an eyewitness who made separate allegations earlier in the day, before Tarhouni spoke, blaming the attacks on members of the 17 February Martyrs' Brigade who allegedly claimed that Younis had their father killed several years earlier.

=== 30 July ===
- Early in the morning, NATO bombed three satellite dishes in Tripoli in an attempt to put state television off the air, but the channel continued to broadcast. NATO at first released a press video to journalists titled "NATO Silences Gaddafi's Terror Broadcasts" but later changed that to "NATO Strikes Libyan State TV Satellite Facility".
- According to Khaled Basilia, the director of al-Jamahiriya television's English-language service, the airstrikes on the state broadcasters facilities killed three journalist and wounded another 15. He termed the air strike "an act of international terrorism" and says that it violated the UN resolutions under which NATO was acting. "We are not a military target, we are not commanders in the army and we do not pose threat to civilians," he said. He also demanded full protection from the international community. NATO said it was acting to "protect civilians" by hitting the site.
- Libyan rebels captured the town of Takhut in the Western Mountains near the Wazin border crossing after previously taking Ghezaya. They also surrounded Tiji, the last loyalist town in the Western Mountains, and said they expected to take it by the end of the day.
- The Associated Press reported a long line of refugees attempting to return home to Nalut had formed on the Tunisian side of the Dhuheiba border crossing.
- Mustafa Abdul Jalil, the leader of the NTC, admitted that the murder of Abdul Fatah Younis had been carried out after the general was arrested and recalled to Benghazi for questioning. He said it did not appear to be the work of Islamists, noting the throats of Younis and his two aides had not been cut, and said that although the killers were rebel fighters, the assassination may have been part of a plot by pro-Gaddafi loyalists to sow chaos within the opposition. However, a reporter with Al Jazeera said Younis's supporters did not appear dissuaded from blaming Islamists within the rebel ranks for the triple slaying.
- In response to the Younis's assassination, apparently by rogue brigands aligned with anti-Gaddafi forces, top NTC officials Mustafa Abdul Jalil and Ali Tarhouni said armed civilian militias must disband, and volunteers would be given the option to join the NLA at the frontlines, join the Benghazi security forces in patrolling the rebels' de facto capital, or end their belligerence in the civil war.

=== 31 July ===
- Fighters loyal to the NTC raided a Benghazi neighborhood and traded gunfire with members of a militia group that refused to surrender their arms in compliance with the NTC's edict that all militias must disband. The NTC forces reportedly stormed a license plate factory during the early-morning clashes and arrested close to 50 militiamen. At a news conference, officials claimed the fighters constituted a fifth column of Gaddafi loyalists masquerading as rebels, but journalists were unable to independently confirm these assertions. Three NTC soldiers were killed and eight injured, while the rogue militia suffered four dead and twelve wounded, according to the NTC.
- Rebels reportedly captured Al-Josh in the Western Mountains. However, loyalist forces did not retreat far from the city. Hours later, the village was retaken by loyalist forces and the rebels were driven out.
- Reuters reported that an estimated 5,000 residents of Ghezaya, supporters of Gaddafi, were transported to Tripoli during the rebels' advance against the town before they have seized it, leaving behind a ghost town. Gaddafi has always maintained supporters in Ghazaia and other places in the plains below the Western Mountains, despite international pressure on him to step down.
- Contrary to earlier reports that rebel authorities in Misrata had split from the NTC in Benghazi, Misrata's top military commander said there were no divisions in the anti-Gaddafi forces over Abdul Fatah Younis's death, adding, "This will not hinder the revolution."

=== 1 August ===
- According to The Guardian, opposition fighters claimed to have captured Zliten, west of Misrata. However, Al Jazeera reported that the situation was still "fluid" and said heavy fighting was still taking place in and around the city.
- The Norwegian government announced it had completed withdrawing its six fighter jets from Operation Unified Protector. Norwegian F-16 Fighting Falcons carried out 583 missions out of a total of 6,493 flown by NATO warplanes since 31 March, a military spokesman said.

=== 2 August ===
- Early in the morning rebel forces managed to push westwards, reaching the civilian populated areas of Zliten, sparking clashes with Gaddafi's forces in the town. While in the town's centre, the rebels waited for an approval of Zliten's Fowater tribe to take control of the town, but they did not immediately agree.
- Several hours later, the rebels were flanked in a surprise attack by loyalist forces along the entire line they had on the outskirts of the town and they were forced to withdraw, sustaining heavy casualties in the process. Reuters reported that at least seven rebels were killed and 65 wounded during a loyalist counter-attack. An Al Jazeera correspondent reported that rebel fighters from Misrata are reluctant to go into Zliten again, because they could be perceived by the people of that town as invading it and bringing the fight to them. Zliten was defended by the Khamis Brigade under the leadership of Khamis Gaddafi.
- The tribe of assassinated rebel commander Abdul Fatah Younis vowed to find justice for themselves if those responsible for his death were not quickly found. Younis was a member of the Ubaideyat tribe, one of the largest in Libya.
- The International Organization for Migration declared the success of an operation that it claimed had airlifted 1,398 stranded migrants, mostly Chadians, out of Libya as of 30 July.

=== 3 August ===
- Libyan rebels seized control of an oil tanker ship, believed to belong to the Gaddafi government, in the Mediterranean Sea near Malta, which contained up to 250,000 barrels of fuel. The ship was then diverted by rebels on board to the port of Benghazi.
- Saif al-Islam Gaddafi said that his family had forged an alliance with Islamists against secular liberal rebels. "Libya will look like Saudi Arabia, like Iran. So what?," he stated, also saying that the liberals would "escape or be killed."
- The International Federation of Journalists condemned deliberate NATO bombing of Libyan State TV, which allegedly killed three journalists and wounded another fifteen, during an air raid on 30 July.
- Msallata, a town 100 kilometres (62 miles) east of Tripoli behind loyalist lines, reportedly revolted against Gaddafi at sunset, leaving three dead and the town under virtual quarantine.

=== 4 August ===
- Ali Sallabi, a senior rebel leader of Islamist persuasion, denied any split with between Islamist rebels and their liberal compatriots, characterizing it as a "lie that seeks to create a crack in the national accord." Sallabi did acknowledge that there were contacts with Saif Gaddafi, but said that "Our dialogue with them is always based on three points: Gaddafi and his sons must leave Libya, the capital (Tripoli) must be protected from destruction and the blood of Libyans must be spared." He said that relations between secular and Islamist rebels were strong because both supported "justice and pluralism."
- Abdel Karim Bin Taher, an NTC official, attributed the death of Younis to "the fifth column," while residents of Derna denied that their town had significant numbers of Islamic extremists.
- Loyalist forces were back in full control of Zliten and journalists taken on an official tour of the town by government officials. While on a tour, they were also present at a burial of three coffins, allegedly containing remains of a local woman and her two children, aged three and five, who were killed by NATO air strikes according to the local residents.
- Salah Mohamed Askar, a member of an NBC News team in the Nafusa Mountains, was killed in a rocket attack near Teji.

=== 5 August ===
- Rebels claimed a NATO strike killed Khamis Gaddafi, Gaddafi's youngest son. This was the second time in the conflict that the rebels had claimed to have killed Khamis. Both Moussa Ibrahim and Khaled Kaim denied claims that Khamis had been killed, the latter dismissing it as a "dirty trick" to cover up the killing of members of the al-Marabit family. A NATO spokesman in Brussels, Belgium, also said they could not confirm Khamis's death.
- French Foreign Minister Alain Juppe, claimed that the southern regions of Libya were "practically under the NTC's control", that the rebels were making progress around, and that it was far too early to speak of getting "bogged down". He also expressed confidence in the NTC.
- An international media safety group was joining calls for the UN to investigate NATO's bombing of Libyan state television. The International News Safety Institute (INSI) asked UN Secretary-General Ban Ki-moon to investigate whether the airstrike was in breach of a UN Security Council resolution that bans attacks on journalists. INSI director Rodney Pinder said such attacks could not be excused "on the basis that you disagree with the point of view of the news organizations".

=== 6 August ===
- The NTC announced a new program as part of a temporary financial mechanism to distribute 14 million Libyan dinars "for a Family Support Programme to be distributed directly to families throughout the Nafusa Mountains" during Ramadan. In a statement, it said working people in the mountains had not been paid wages since January 2011, and the payments would help "kick-start the economy".
- Opposition forces captured Bir al-Ghanem in western Libya in their advance toward Zawiya. Six rebel fighters were killed to an unknown number of loyalist casualties.
- Msallata, 70 kilometres (43 miles) west of Zliten, was besieged by loyalist forces, and a member of its rebel military committee said he expected a bloodbath.
- A Qatari transport plane landed briefly in Misrata to offload ammunition for rebels in their offensive to take Zliten.
- Rebel commanders said the NLA renewed its push toward Brega and had forces advancing from three sides, though they said the advance was relatively slow due to the lingering threat of minefields around the port city.

=== 7 August ===
- Pro-Gaddafi forces attempted to retake Bir al-Ghanam. Though a Gaddafi government spokesman said it held the town, rebel commanders disputed the report and said the counterattack had been repulsed. A Western photojournalist working in western Libya tweeted that when he visited Bir al-Ghanam in the afternoon, the town was still in rebel hands, but there was no other independent verification of the claims during the day. An Al Jazeera correspondent reporting from near Bir al-Ghanam said rebels were continuing to advance.
- Al Jazeera reported that an attempt by thirty Libyan Army vehicles to outflank rebel forces advancing on Zliten was abandoned when the loyalists came under fire from the Shaheed unit, said to be among the most elite rebel outfits. Five of the vehicles were reportedly left behind in the retreat. The number of dead was unknown, but Al Jazeera's field correspondent reported that loyalists took significant casualties.

=== 8 August ===
- The NTC fired its executive board and asked the board's chairman, Mahmoud Jibril, to submit his recommendations for a new cabinet to the council. NTC Chairman Jalil said the decision was undertaken as a result of the board's handling of Younis's killing, saying, "The members of the executive bureau did not dispose with the assassination issue in a proper manner." Other NTC officials added that the amount of time ministers spent outside of Libya, especially in Doha, Qatar, was a reason for the board's dismissal. Jibril, the only member of the board who was not sacked, would be asked to spend more time in Libya as a condition of his continued tenure as the executive board's chairman, a spokesman said.
- Reuters confirmed that Bir al-Ghanam remained under rebel control. Rebels in the town said they were preparing to march on Zawiya.
- The NTC announced the formation of a dedicated security force to protect oil installations in Cyrenaica.

=== 9 August ===
- A Gaddafi government spokesman said 85 civilians – 33 children, 32 women and 20 men from 12 families – were killed by NATO airstrikes in Majer, a village south of Zliten. Imed Lamloum, an Agence France-Presse correspondent, reported that he and a group of foreign journalists, attended the funerals of victims and saw 28 bodies buried at the local cemetery. In the hospital morgue, 30 bodies, most of whom were young men but including two children and one woman, were shown along with other bodies which had been torn apart. A NATO spokesman said that after monitoring the military compound very carefully, they had targeted nine vehicles and four buildings in the area. "Our assessment, based on the level of destruction of the buildings, confirms the likelihood of military and mercenary casualties. The allegation of civilian casualties made by the Gaddafi regime was not corroborated by available factual information at the site."
- NTC representatives formally took over the Libyan embassy to the UK in London, England.

=== 10 August ===
- The Tunisian Interior Ministry said police in M'saken, in northeastern Tunisia, had stopped five trucks loaded with petrol bound for Gaddafi-controlled western Libya. A Reuters source with the Libyan opposition confirmed the claim.
- NATO denied it hit a civilian target in Majer, with a spokesman saying the targets of the airstrike were determined to be legitimate military targets and were "very carefully" identified and observed. He added that while NATO had expected casualties, its analysis "confirms the likelihood of military and mercenary casualties", and NATO did not believe it had caused any civilian casualties in the bombing.
- Three NTC soldiers were killed near Brega.
- Rebel fighters claimed they reached Nasr, 25 kilometres (16 miles) south of Zawiya. However, they pulled back several kilometers after encountering strong resistance.

=== 11 August ===
- The government in Tripoli banned the unauthorised possession and use of Thuraya satellite telephones and threatened anyone in Libya found with one with execution. State-run media explained, "Spies among the traitors and the agents of ... NATO use the Thuraya telephones to give crusaders the coordinates of some locations to be bombed, which has caused the deaths of a large number of civilians." Reuters noted the phones are Emirati in origin and are also frequently used by foreign journalists in Libya.
- The Emirati government turned over a captured Libyan Air Force Ilyushin Il-76 transport plane to the NTC in Benghazi, who welcomed it as the Free Libyan Air Force's "first cargo plane" and said it would be "used to transport humanitarian aid from abroad to Libya".
- Rebels in western Libya claimed they had taken Nasr and Bir Shuaib, putting them less than 25 kilometres (16 miles) from Zawiya, but they did not allow journalists all the way to the front to independently confirm the report. The signs of recent NATO airstrikes in Shalghouda, aiding the fighters' advance, were observed by Western reporters.
- An NLA spokesman near Brega said most civilians and loyalist soldiers had fled from the port city. Late in the day, rebel forces claimed to have "liberated" Brega. Al Jazeera reported that while the eastern, residential parts of Brega seemed to be under rebel control, fighting was still taking place in the south of the city, and the western part remained in pro-Gaddafi hands. At least eight rebel soldiers were killed and about twenty-five more were injured during the fighting. An injured soldier told Al Jazeera, "Brega has been liberated on 11 August 2011."
- Tunisian troops were conducting regular checks at gas stations in southern Tunisia and policing the amount of gasoline or diesel fuel allotted per customer, according to a Tunisian Ministry of Defense spokesman, who said the new measures were intended to prevent fuel smuggling into Libya.

=== 12 August ===
- A prisoner of war claiming to be an intelligence officer said Gaddafi was still "very strong" and enjoyed the backing of about seventy percent of Tripoli residents.
- France's aircraft carrier Charles de Gaulle (R91), returned to the port of Toulon for maintenance after more than four months of continuous operations off the Libyan coast. French President Nicolas Sarkozy gave a speech to forces aboard the Charles de Gaulle, reaffirming France's commitment to continue the aerial bombardment of Libya "until the end of the mission".
- The Russian government moved to comply with UN Security Council Resolution 1973 by strengthening economic sanctions against the Gaddafi government, freezing the assets of Gaddafi and his inner circle inside Russia and banning the use of Russian airspace by Libyan aircraft or any aircraft on a non-humanitarian mission to Libya.
- NTC forces pushing southeast out of Misrata took control of Tawergha, though they continued to face lingering resistance in the old quarter of the city. An Al Jazeera correspondent reported that soldiers were conducting house-to-house sweeps in an effort to locate and arrest loyalist snipers in the city.

=== 13 August ===
- Opposition fighters briefly claimed they had taken control of Gharyan, but then later told the Associated Press that fighting there was renewed when loyalist forces pushed from the garrison city at the foot of the Nafusa Mountains returned with reinforcements. One anti-Gaddafi volunteer said many residents of Gharyan had risen up to join the fight against Gaddafi's soldiers. However, no journalists were allowed to the front, and these claims could not be confirmed. Late in the day, a rebel official said anti-Gaddafi forces had captured two fuel tankers, as well as weapons, vehicles, and ammunition, and controlled ninety-five percent of the city, with a loyalist brigade pinned down in one of Gharyan's numerous military bases.
- A spokesman for rebel forces pushing toward Zawiya said fighters were surrounding the city and had made contact with its residents, who signaled readiness to join the fight as they approached. A Reuters producer and his crew reported the coastal highway was blocked at Zawiya and they could hear the sound of gunfire on the city's outskirts. Al Jazeera English reported that fighting was taking place inside the city, and an Associated Press reporter on the scene reported residents of the city were rushing into the streets by the hundreds to greet the rebels as they entered Zawiya. One force reportedly advanced to a bridge on the southwestern edge of the city, while another group punched through into the city centre. By nightfall, the rebels reportedly occupied the city centre but did not yet have full control, with fighting raging back and forth across the arterial highway running through the city. A Gaddafi government spokesman denied rebels had taken the city, calling it a "suicide mission" and saying they had been "stopped easily".
- A colonel held in Misrata as a POW by the rebels said Gaddafi used mercenaries to force the regular army to fight and keep them from deserting. He said that at the time he was captured roughly two months prior, divisions were forming between the army and the mercenaries. "I think it will soon collapse," he claimed of the loyalist fighting force.
- A NATO airstrike against loyalist positions in Brega destroyed two armored vehicles and killed six Libyan Army servicemen.
- Rebel forces moved to capture the Ras Ajdir border crossing with Tunisia, clashing with loyalist troops defending the crossing.
- An NTC spokesman claimed Tawergha was secured and rebels had taken up new positions south of the city, capturing a bridge on the highway to Sirte. An officer involved in the successful offensive said that despite the loss of twelve anti-Gaddafi fighters, "Our martyrs can rest easy in their graves, and the children can sleep easy in their beds."

=== 14 August ===
- Reuters reported that rebels held the city centre of Zawiya, though rebel commanders claimed loyalist snipers remained in the city and a Reuters correspondent inside the city said occasional gunfire could be heard. Al Jazeera reported the city centre remained contested, though it quoted rebels as saying that they controlled seventy percent of Zawiya. A colonel with the Nafusi military command claimed in an interview with Al Jazeera that although fighting continued "as opposition forces are pushing pro-Gaddafi forces out", Zawiya was effectively under their control.
- Rebels claimed they had taken Sorman, just west of Zawiya, but this report could not be immediately corroborated. A spokesman for opposition forces said ten rebels were killed and thirty-four were injured, but added that the city was secured and fighting had stopped.
- Fighting reportedly continued in Gharyan, according to a rebel commander, though he said the city was controlled by the Libyan opposition.
- Two Libyans crossing into Tunisia claimed they witnessed clashes in Sabratha, west of Sorman.
- Reuters investigated eyewitness accounts of clashes at the Ras Ajdir border crossing from the previous evening and found loyalist Libyan customs and immigration officials operating normally, though occasional gunshots could be heard on the Libyan side of the border.
- A rebel colonel in the Nafusa Mountains told Al Jazeera that Ajaylat had been secured by anti-Gaddafi forces.

=== 15 August ===
- Fighting continued in Zawiya, with rebels still unable to reach Martyrs' Square in the city's centre because of sniper fire and shelling. They told Al Jazeera they had arrested fifteen "mercenaries" and were attempting to clear the remaining pro-Gaddafi forces from the city.
- Opposition forces said they had taken Gharyan and were in "full control" of the garrison city.
- Negotiations between NTC and loyalist representatives reportedly took place in Tunisia. According to some reports, foreign officials were also present, including former Jordanian Foreign Minister Abdul Ilah Khatib in his capacity as the UN's special envoy to Libya. One report suggested a representative from the Venezuelan government, a strong ally of Tripoli, was in attendance. Other reports said Qatari and South African aircraft were at Djerba, the Tunisian island where negotiations between the factions had historically been held. NTC Vice Chairman Abdul Hafiz Ghoga categorically denied his government was negotiating with the Gaddafi government, while the UN declined to confirm or deny whether Khatib was mediating negotiations.
- Interior Minister Nasr al-Mabrouk Abdullah apparently defected from the Gaddafi government, flying to Cairo, Egypt, with his family.
- Opposition fighters in Sabratha said they were negotiating the surrender of loyalist holdouts in the coastal town.
- The NTC issued a statement urging people in areas still under Gaddafi's control to organise into local committees in preparation for the fall of the government.
- Gaddafi loyalists in Sirte, in an apparent attempt at revenge for recent battlefield defeats, fired a Scud missile towards rebel-held territory near Ajdabiya, though it landed harmlessly in the desert. A Western official said, "That it didn't hit anything or kill anyone is not the point. It's a weapon of mass destruction that Colonel Gaddafi is willing to train on his own people."
- Rebels in the Nafusa Mountains claimed to have finally taken Teji, though the report was not verified.
- Opposition forces announced that Tripoli was cut off from supplies and effectively besieged, with routes through the cities of Zawiya and Gharyan under rebel control, and supply routes from Tunisia and the south of Libya into Tripoli blocked.

== Continuation ==
- For later events, see Timeline of the Libyan civil war and military intervention (16 August – 23 October), a chronology from 16 August up to the war's end.

== See also ==
- 2011 military intervention in Libya
- 2011 Libyan rebel coastal offensive
- 2011 Nafusa Mountains Campaign
- Arab Spring
- List of modern conflicts in North Africa
