= Khaled Kaim =

Libyan politician

Khaled Kaim was the Deputy Foreign Minister of Libya. On 5 September 2011, it was reported that he has been arrested in Tripoli during the Libyan Civil War. As of 2022, Kaim had been reported to be living in Uganda.
