= Omar El-Hariri =

Minister of Military Affairs of the National Transitional Council of Libya

Omar Mokhtar El-Hariri

Minister of Military Affairs of the National Transitional Council of Libya
- In office 23 March – May 2011
- Preceded by: Position established
- Succeeded by: Jalal al-Digheily

Personal details
- Born: c. 1944 Libya
- Died: November 2, 2015 (aged 70–71) Libya
- Party: Anti-Gaddafi forces

Omar Mokhtar El-Hariri (Arabic: عمر الحريري, romanized: ʻUmar al-Ḥarīrī; c. 1944 – 2 November 2015) was a leading figure of the National Transitional Council of Libya who served as the Minister of Military Affairs in 2011, during the Libyan Civil War. He controlled the National Liberation Army and the Free Libyan Air Force from March to May 2011. He served on the council executive board before being replaced by Jalal al-Digheily, and he headed Military Affairs in the unicameral National Transitional Council legislature.

El-Hariri was involved in the initial 1969 coup against the monarchy that began Muammar Gaddafi's 42-year rule of Libya. He organised a plot to overthrow Gaddafi in 1975. When the coup was uncovered, 300 men were arrested, four of whom died during interrogation. Of the remainder, 21 were sentenced to death, including El-Hariri. He was imprisoned for 15 years from 1975 to 1990 under a death sentence, with four and a half years in solitary confinement. Gaddafi commuted the sentence in 1990 and El-Hariri was subsequently placed under house arrest until the Libyan civil war broke out in 2011. After breaking free of his detention, El-Hariri eventually became the political head of the National Transitional Council's armed forces.

In an interview with The Globe and Mail, El-Hariri said of Libya's future, "They will elect a new president and he will serve for a limited time. He could be removed if he does not serve the people. And, of course, we will need a parliament, and a multiparty system."

On 19 May 2011, The Economist reported Jalal al-Digheily had been appointed "defense minister". Al Jazeera and the Jamestown Foundation later confirmed that Digheily had replaced El-Hariri. Unlike El-Hariri, Digheily was reportedly given a seat on the executive board of the National Transitional Council, while the "military affairs" department that El-Hariri had headed was afforded a seat on the council itself.

He died in a road accident on 2 November 2015 on the road between Al Bayda and Al Qubbah.
