= Al Maya =

Coordinates: 32°47′49″N 12°53′13″E

AlMaya
- Village
- Location in Libya
- Country: Libya
- municipality: almaya
- Time zone: UTC+2 (EET)

AlMaya is a coastal area located in the northwest of Libya, about 27 kilometres (17 mi) west of the capital Tripoli. Almaya follows salahaldin, Tina, and Tuwaybiyah. Almaya forms a municipality. The Al Mayah region is bounded by the Mediterranean Sea to the north, Janzour in the east, Al-Zawiya in the west and Al- Maamoura in the south.

On 21 August 2011, rebels fighting in the Libyan Civil War advanced on the town but were pushed back by heavy artillery. After the reverse at Maya, Nato reportedly launched air strikes in the area. Rebels then later seized control of Maya, one resident saying that government forces put up "a brief fight" at the village, leaving behind a burned-out tank, and some cars that had been torched. "I am very happy," said one resident. Reuters reported that the anti-Gaddafi fighters paused long enough to daub some graffiti on walls in the village. One read, "We are here and we are fighting Gaddafi," another, "God is great." They then moved on towards Tripoli.

The Anti-Gaddafi forces said that they released dozens of prisoners held in Maya on 21 August.

== See also ==
- List of cities in Libya
