= Raid on Ras Lanuf =

Military action during the Libyan Civil War

Coordinates: 30°35′12″N 18°24′43″E

- Part of Libyan Civil War
Date	12 September 2011
Location	Ras Lanuf, Libya
Result	Indecisive: Pro-Gaddafi saboteurs damage oil facilities; Anti-Gaddafi forces drive off attackers

Belligerents
(Libya) Anti-Gaddafi forces: National Liberation Army	(Libya) Gaddafi loyalists: Paramilitary forces

Commanders and leaders
(Libya) Hamid Hassy (Libya) Fadl-Allah Haroun	Unknown

Strength
About 60 refinery workers Unknown number of fighters	15 saboteurs Up to 150 fighters 14–40 vehicles

Casualties and losses
15–17 fighters killed, 2 workers wounded	Unknown*
- *One NTC source claimed 15 loyalists were killed and 10 captured, but later reports made no mention of pro-Gaddafi losses

The raid on Ras Lanuf was a hit-and-run attack carried out in the early morning of 12 September 2011 by two groups of fighters loyal to Muammar Gaddafi in an apparently coordinated effort to disrupt oil refinery and export operations in the National Transitional Council-administered port town of Ra's Lanuf, Libya, during the Libyan Civil War.

== Sabotage attempt ==
According to Colonel Hamid Hassy, 15 people working at the oil terminal in Ra's Lanuf acted as arsonists, setting fire to the oil facility. They clashed with anti-Gaddafi security forces, and five were killed while the rest were arrested, Hasi said. The New York Times was unable to confirm this series of events, which was initially reported by the Associated Press.

== Hit-and-run raid ==
Fadl-Allah Haroun, another anti-Gaddafi commander, reported that a convoy of up to 40 vehicles, reportedly flying the tricolour flag to appear friendly, apparently moving out of a refugee camp 30 km south of Ra's Lanuf attacked the port. He said that 10 pro-Gaddafi attackers were killed in the ensuing shootout, and the pro-Gaddafi forces were forced to retreat. A refinery worker's story differed slightly, saying 14 or 15 trucks carrying pro-Gaddafi fighters had come from the west, perhaps from the loyalist stronghold of Sirte, and attacked the refinery as its 60 staff members slept. There was also no mention of casualties among the attacking force. The fighting reportedly was heaviest around the administration building, with rocket attacks being launched against the refinery, but much of the complex was unscathed. A spokesman for the NTC said 15 to 17 anti-Gaddafi fighters were killed in the attack. There were no further reports of fighting in the city.

Benghazi-based Colonel Ahmed Omar Bani said defenders in Ra's Lanuf reported the attackers "did not look like Libyans" and suggested they could be refugees paid to fight by well-monied Gaddafi loyalists.
