= Jalal al-Digheily =

Libyan politician

Minister of Defence of the National Transitional Council of Libya
- In office May 2011 – 22 November 2011
- Preceded by: Omar El-Hariri
- Succeeded by: Osama al-Juwali

Personal details
- Political party: Anti-Gaddafi forces

Jalal Muhammad Mansur al-Digheily, sometimes transliterated al-Dogheily (Arabic: جلال محمد منصور الدغيلي, romanized: Jalāl Muḥammad Manṣūr al-Digheyly) is a Libyan politician who served as the Defence Minister of Libya under the National Transitional Council during the 2011 Libyan civil war. Digheily succeeded Omar El-Hariri no later than 19 May 2011 after the latter was relieved over ongoing tensions with General Abdul Fatah Younis, then the National Liberation Army chief. Though El-Hariri held the title of Minister of Military Affairs, virtually all sources have referred to Digheily as the Defence Minister of the National Transitional Council. He was fired along with 14 other members of the 16-person Executive Board on 8 August 2011, but was reappointed in early October 2011 after continuing in the role of interim defence minister for almost two months. When Prime Minister Abdurrahim El-Keib announced his cabinet on 22 November 2011, Digheily was excluded in favor of Zintan Brigade commander Osama al-Juwali.

== Background ==
According to The Economist, Digheily is a civilian, not a military man. The Jamestown Foundation reported that he holds a doctorate.

== 2011 Libyan civil war ==
Unlike his predecessor, Omar El-Hariri, Jalal al-Digheily was reportedly a member of the Executive Board of the National Transitional Council.

Digheily met with the chief of staff of the Qatar Armed Forces on 5 July in Doha.

On 20 July, Digheily visited Nalut in western Libya's Nafusa Mountains. He heralded the alliance forged between Arabs and Amazigh in the region, expressed confidence in Amazigh fighters' ability to defend the nearby Wazzin border crossing with Tunisia, and confirmed that the NTC was working with NATO commanders to pinpoint targets loyal to the Libyan Jamahiriya Government, led by Muammar Gaddafi, whom the NTC was trying to oust, on the western front. He was accompanied by a Qatari representative on his trip to Nalut, a journalist with The Jamestown Foundation reported.

Digheily was in Egypt when Younis, his top military commander, was assassinated outside Benghazi on 28 July. He chose to continue his business in Egypt rather than return to Libya immediately, drawing criticism and sparking calls for his resignation from some quarters. The members of the Executive Board, including Digheily, were dismissed en masse on 8 August 2011, and de facto Prime Minister Mahmoud Jibril was asked to form a new board.

Digheily's replacement was set to be Salem Joha, a Misratan commander favored by Islamist factions, but Mustafa Abdul Jalil interceded and said Digheily would retain his position instead. Al Jazeera claimed that Digheily is also regarded well by Libyan Islamists, with whom liberal politicians like Jibril and Jalil have occasionally clashed during the transitional period.

On 22 November 2011, Osama al-Juwali of the Zintan Brigade was announced as Digheily's official successor. Juwali was named after a successful raid by his troops succeeded in capturing Saif al-Islam Gaddafi, one of the leading figures of the old regime who remained at large for a month after the formal conclusion of the war.
