= Libyan civil war (2011) =

Armed conflict in North Africa

First Libyan Civil War
- Part of the Arab Spring and the Libyan Crisis since 2011
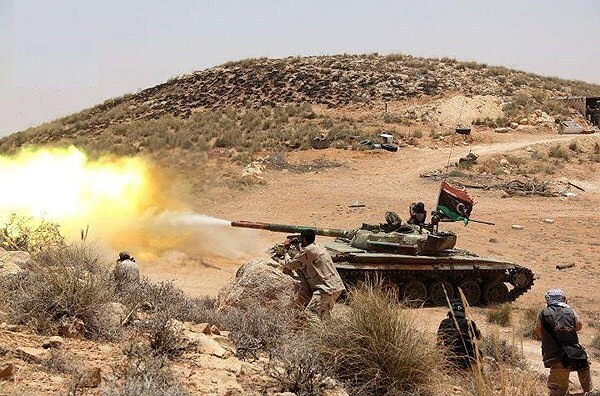
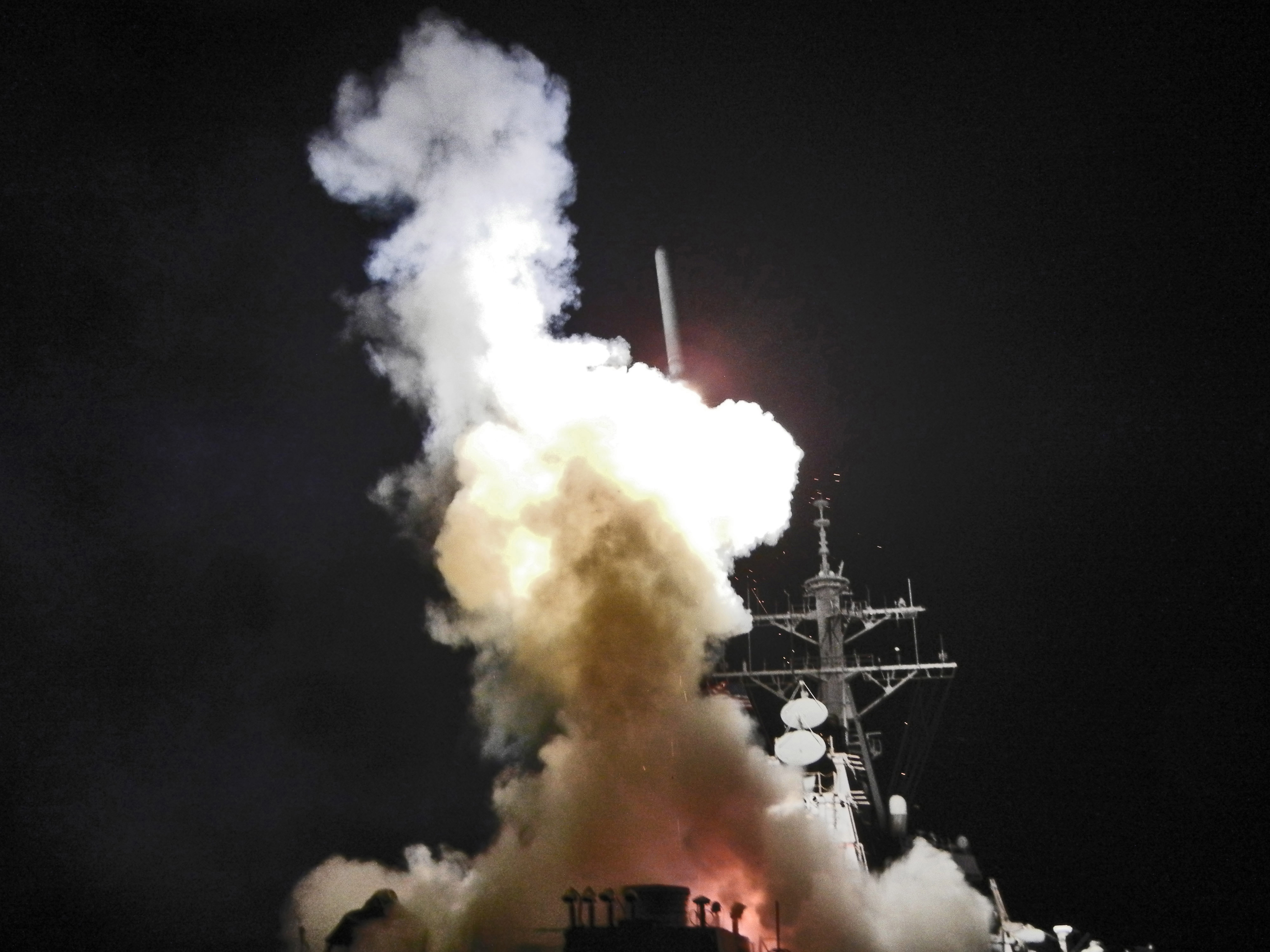
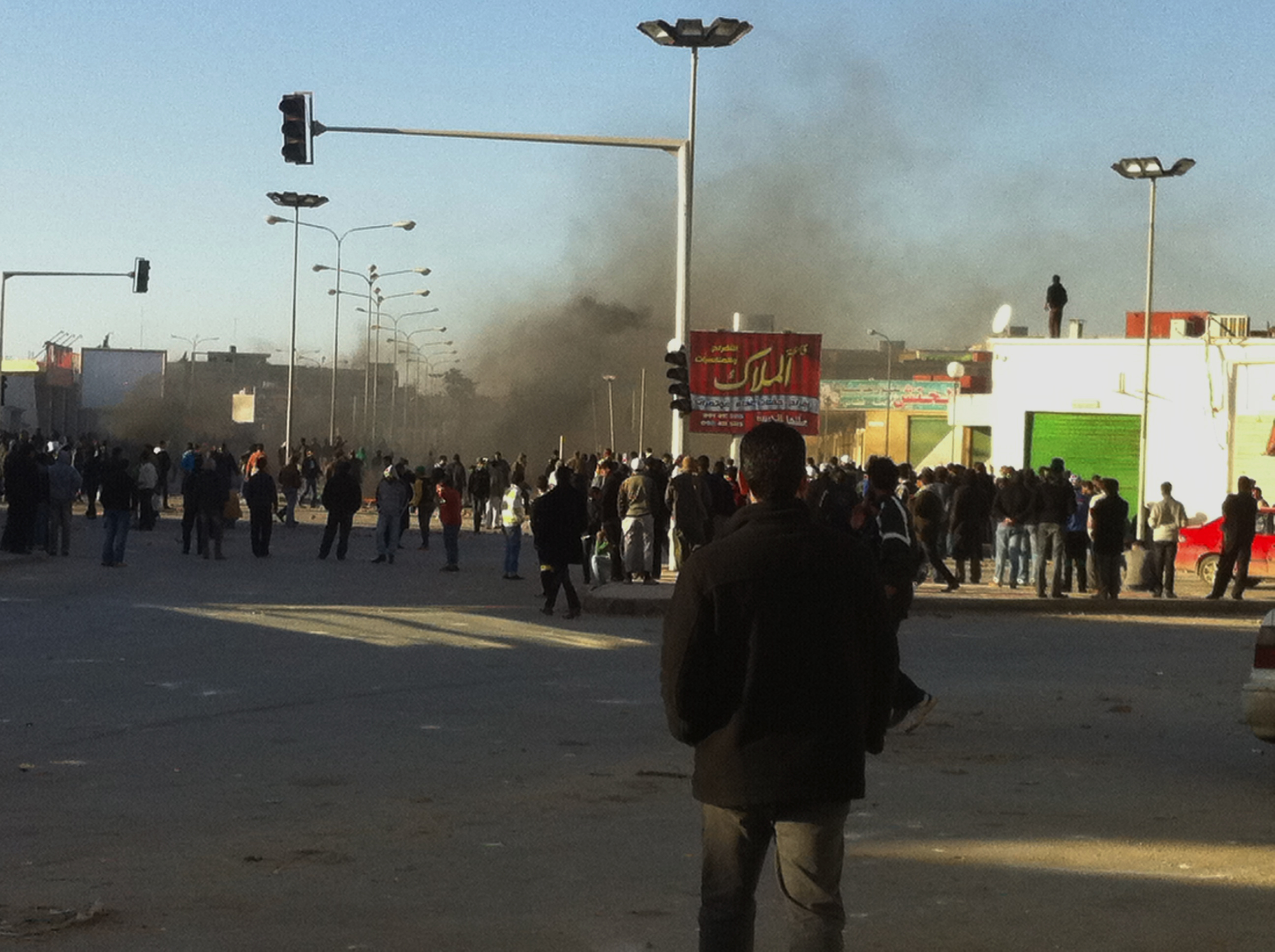
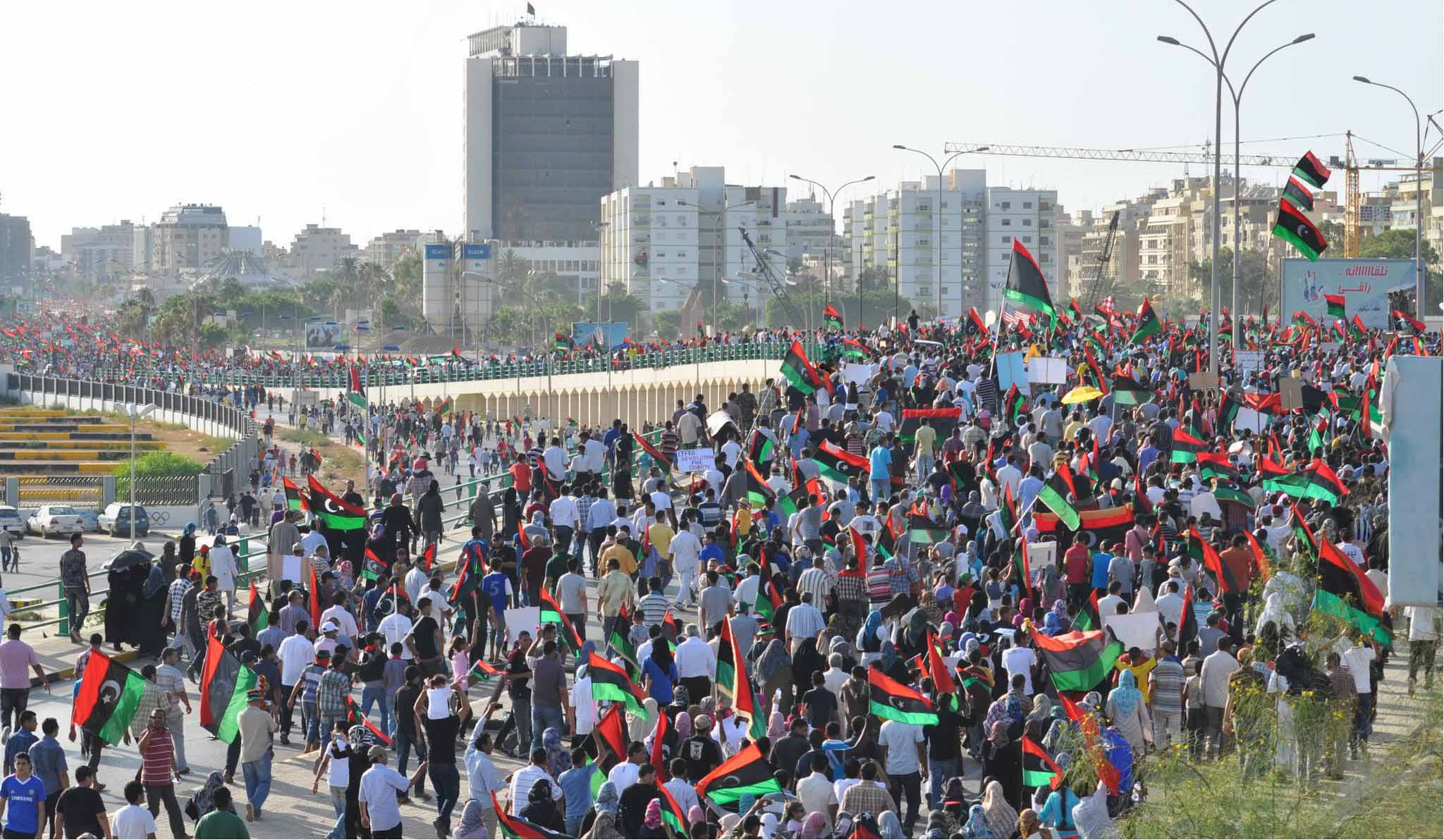
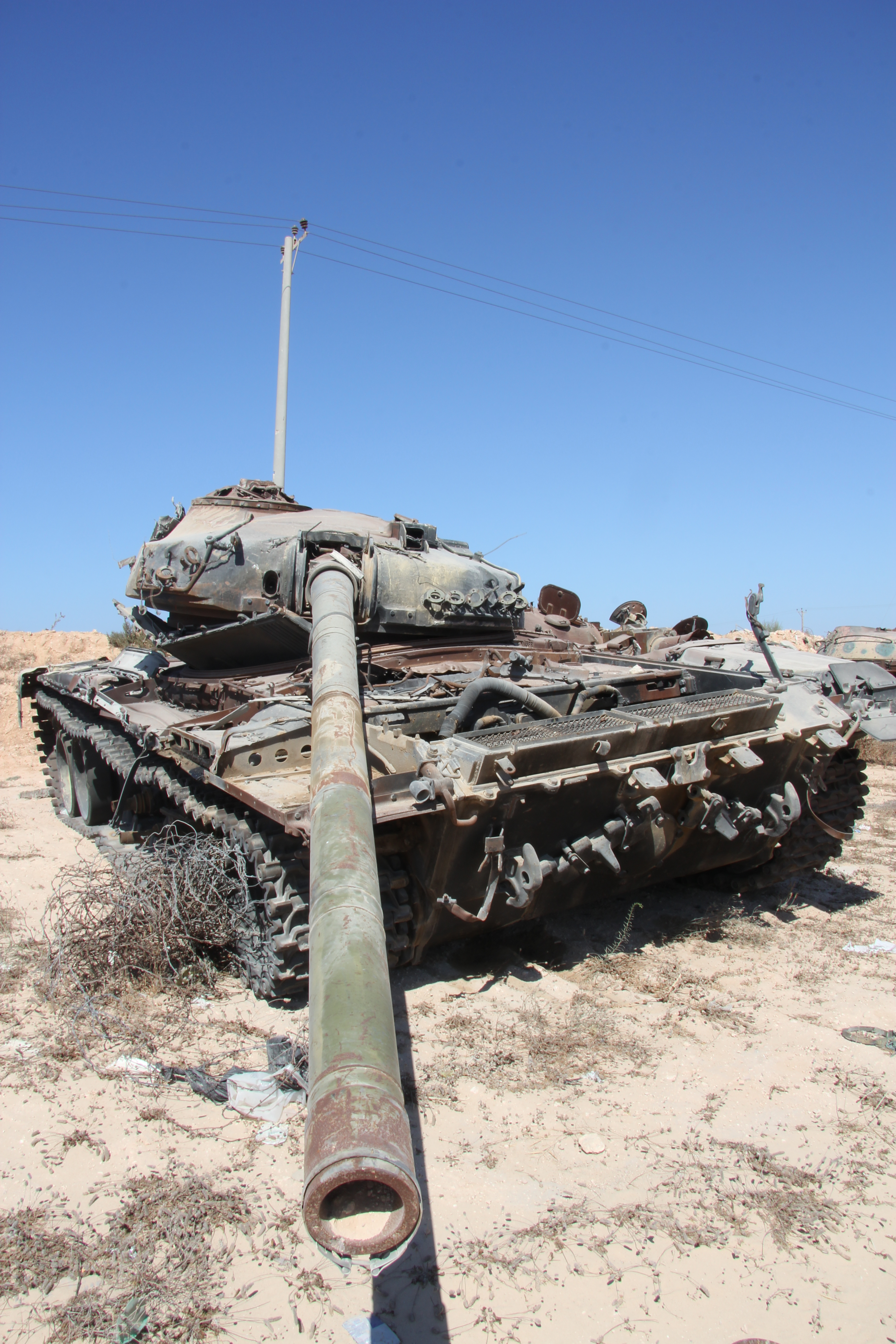
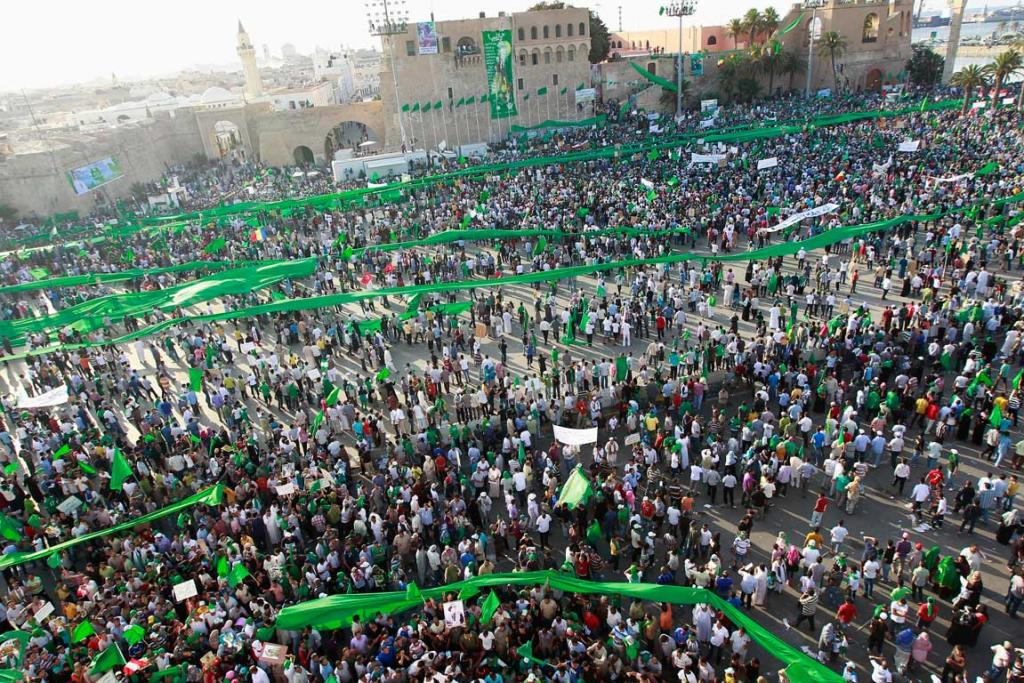
- Clockwise from top left: Libyan rebel's T-72 tank firing at Gaddafi forces position; USS Barry fires a Tomahawk cruise missile during the Operation Odyssey Dawn; Anti-Gaddafi protest in Benghazi, July 2011; Pro-Gaddafi protesters gathered in Green Square; Destroyed T-72 tank outside of Misrata; Confrontation between rebels and pro-Gaddafi forces in Bayda
Date	15 February 2011 – 23 October 2011 (8 months, 1 week and 1 day)
Location	Libya
Result	Libyan opposition/NATO victory

Belligerents
Before 28 August 2011: (Libya) Anti-Gaddafi forces After 28 August 2011: Libya; Qatar NATO (Note: Enforcing UNSC Resolution 1973): Belgium; Bulgaria; Canada; Denmark; France; Greece; Italy; Netherlands; Norway; Poland (only humanitarian and medical aid); Romania; Spain; Turkey; United Kingdom; United States; Other Countries: Jordan; Sweden; United Arab Emirates; Minor border clashes: Tunisia: Tunisian Army; Tunisian Police; Supported by: Egypt; Sudan; Qatar Italy	Before 28 August 2011: Great Socialist People's Libyan Arab Jamahiriya After 28 August 2011: Gaddafi loyalists

Commanders and leaders
Mustafa Jalil; Omar El-Hariri; Jalal al-Digheily; Abdelhakim Belhaj; Abdul Fatah Younis †; Suleiman Mahmoud; Khalifa Haftar; Hamad bin Khalifa Al Thani Robert Gates; James G. Stavridis; J.J.C. Bouchard	Muammar Gaddafi (executed); Saif al-Islam Gaddafi (POW); Khamis Gaddafi †; Mutassim Gaddafi X Abdullah Senussi; Saadi Gaddafi; Saif al-Arab Gaddafi †; Abu-Bakr Yunis Jabr X (Libya) Ali Sharif al-Rifi (Libya) Mahdi al-Arabi (POW)

Units involved
National Transitional Council; National Liberation Army; Defected army units; Tripoli Brigade; Free Libyan Air Force; NFSL; Libyan Islamic Movement; Armed protesters; Local militias; Anti-Gaddafi tribes; Toubou Front for the Salvation of Libya; Fighters from the Awlad Suleiman tribe; Foreign mercenaries (alleged); Foreign military advisors; Support: DGSE; CIA; (United Kingdom) MI6	Libyan Armed Forces; Libyan Army; Elements of the Khamis Brigade; Libyan Air Force; Libyan Navy; Paramilitary forces; Libyan Police; Pro-Gaddafi tribes and militias; Loyalists from the Warfalla, Magarha and Tuareg tribes; Foreign mercenaries (alleged)

Strength
200,000 volunteers by war's end (NTC estimate) International forces: Numerous air and maritime forces (see here)	20,000–50,000 soldiers and militiamen

Casualties and losses
5,904–6,626 killed (other estimates: see here)	3,309–4,227 soldiers killed (other estimates: see here)
- Total casualties (including civilians): 30,000+ killed 4,000 missing 50,000 wounded 7,000 captured (other estimates: see here)
- *Large number of loyalist or immigrant civilians, not military personnel, among those captured by rebels, only an estimated minimum of 1,692+ confirmed as soldiers

The Libyan Civil War, also known as the First Libyan Civil War and Libyan Revolution, was an armed conflict fought in 2011 in the North African country of Libya between forces loyal to Colonel Muammar Gaddafi and rebel groups attempting to oust his government. The war was ignited by protests in Benghazi beginning on 15 February 2011 inspired by the Arab Spring, which led to clashes with security forces and armed protesters. The protests escalated into a rebellion spreading across the country, with the forces opposing Gaddafi establishing an interim governing body, the National Transitional Council.

The United Nations Security Council passed an initial resolution on 26 February, freezing the assets of Gaddafi and his inner circle and restricting their travel, and referred the matter to the International Criminal Court for investigation. In early March, Gaddafi's forces rallied, pushed eastwards and re-took several coastal cities before reaching Benghazi. A further UN resolution authorised member states to establish and enforce a no-fly zone over Libya, and to use "all necessary measures" to prevent attacks on civilians, which turned into a bombing campaign by the forces of NATO against Libyan military installations and vehicles. The Gaddafi government then announced a ceasefire, but fighting and bombing continued. Throughout the conflict, rebels rejected government offers of a ceasefire and efforts by the African Union to end the fighting because the plans set forth did not include the removal of Gaddafi.

In August, rebel forces launched an offensive on the government-held coast of Libya, backed by a wide-reaching NATO bombing campaign, taking back territory lost months before and ultimately capturing the capital city of Tripoli, while Gaddafi evaded capture and loyalists engaged in a rearguard campaign. On 16 September 2011, the National Transitional Council was recognised by the United Nations as the legal representative of Libya, replacing the Gaddafi government. Muammar Gaddafi evaded capture until 20 October 2011, when he was captured and killed in Sirte. The National Transitional Council declared "the liberation of Libya" and the official end of the war on 23 October 2011.

In the aftermath of the civil war, a low-level insurgency by former Gaddafi loyalists continued. There were various disagreements and strife between local militias and tribes, including fighting on 23 January 2012 in the former Gaddafi stronghold of Bani Walid, leading to an alternative town council being established and later recognized by the National Transitional Council (NTC). Madkhalism had become influential among many militias, leading to further division. A much greater issue had been the role of militias which fought in the civil war and their role in Libya's new dispensation. Some refused to disarm, and cooperation with the NTC had been strained, leading to demonstrations against militias and government action to disband such groups or integrate them into the Libyan military. These unresolved issues led directly to a second civil war in Libya.

== Background ==
=== Leadership ===
Muammar Gaddafi was the head of the Free Officers Movement, a group of Arab nationalists that deposed King Idris I in a bloodless coup d'état in 1969. He abolished the Libyan Constitution of 1951, branding it a neocolonial document. From 1969 until 1975, standards of living, life expectancy and literacy grew rapidly. In 1975, he published his manifesto The Green Book. He officially stepped down from power in 1977, and subsequently claimed to be merely a "symbolic figurehead" until 2011, with the Libyan government up until then also denying that he held any power.

Under Gaddafi, Libya was theoretically a decentralized, direct democracy state run according to the philosophy of Gaddafi's The Green Book, with Gaddafi retaining a ceremonial position. Libya was officially run by a system of people's committees which served as local governments for the country's subdivisions, an indirectly elected General People's Congress as the legislature, and the General People's Committee, led by a Secretary-General, as the executive branch. According to Freedom House, however, these structures were often manipulated to ensure the dominance of Gaddafi, who reportedly continued to dominate all aspects of government.

WikiLeaks' disclosure of confidential US diplomatic cables revealed US diplomats there speaking of Gaddafi's "mastery of tactical maneuvering". While placing relatives and loyal members of his tribe in central military and government positions, he skilfully marginalized supporters and rivals, thus maintaining a delicate balance of powers, stability and economic developments. This extended even to his own sons, as he repeatedly changed affections to avoid the rise of a clear successor and rival.

Both Gaddafi and the Libyan Arab Jamahiriya, however, officially denied that he held any power, but said that he was merely a symbolic figurehead. While he was popularly seen as a demagogue in the West, Gaddafi always portrayed himself as a statesman-philosopher.

According to several Western media sources, Gaddafi feared a military coup against his government and deliberately kept Libya's military relatively weak. The Libyan Army consisted of about 50,000 personnel. Its most powerful units were four crack brigades of highly equipped and trained soldiers, composed of members of Gaddafi's tribe or members of other tribes loyal to him. One, the Khamis Brigade, was led by his son Khamis. Local militias and Revolutionary Committees across the country were also kept well-armed. By contrast, regular military units were poorly trained, and were armed with largely outdated military equipment.

=== Development and corruption ===
By the end of Gaddafi's 42-year rule, Libya's population had a per capita income of $14,000, though a third was estimated to still live below the national poverty line. A broadly secular society was imposed. Under Gaddafi, child marriage was banned, and women enjoyed equality of equal pay for equal work, equal rights in divorce and access to higher education rose from 8% in 1966 to 43% in 1996, equal to that of men. Homelessness was insignificant, with literacy rates estimated at 88%, and average life expectancy rose from 51/54 in 1969 to 74/77.

Libya under Gaddafi used to have a higher GDP (PPP) per capita than the EU and the US in the past.

Much of the state's income came from its oil production, which soared in the 1970s. In the 1980s, a large portion of it was spent on arms purchases, and on sponsoring militant groups and independence movements around the world. Libya's economy was structured primarily around the nation's energy sector, which in the 2000s generated about 95% of export earnings, 80% of GDP, and 99% of government income. Libya is a member of OPEC and one of the world's largest oil producers. It was producing roughly 1.6 million barrels a day before the war, nearly 70% of them through the state-owned National Oil Corporation. Additionally, the country's sovereign wealth fund, the Libyan Investment Authority, was one of the largest in the world, controlling assets worth approximately US$56 billion, including over 100 tons of gold reserves in the Central Bank of Libya. Libya's GDP per capita (PPP), human development index, and literacy rate were better than in Egypt and Tunisia, whose Arab Spring revolutions preceded the outbreak of protests in Libya.

Libya's corruption perception index in 2010 was 2.2, ranking 146th out of 178 countries, worse than that of Egypt (ranked 98th) and Tunisia (ranked 59th). One paper speculated that such a situation created a broader contrast between good education, high demand for democracy, and the government's practices (perceived corruption, political system, supply of democracy). An estimated 13% of Libyan citizens were unemployed. More than 16% of families had no members earning a stable income, and 43.3% had just one. Despite one of the highest unemployment rates in the region, there was a consistent labor shortage with over a million migrant workers present on the market. These migrant workers were the bulk of the refugees leaving Libya after the beginning of hostilities. Despite this, Libya's Human Development Index in 2010 was the highest in Africa and greater than that of Saudi Arabia. Libya had welfare systems allowing access to free education, free healthcare, and financial assistance for housing, and the Great Manmade River was built to allow free access to fresh water across large parts of the country.

Some of the worst economic conditions were in the eastern parts of the state, once a breadbasket of the ancient world, where Gaddafi extracted oil. Except for housing improvements and the Great Manmade River, little infrastructure was developed in this region for many years. For example, the only sewage facility in Benghazi was over 40 years old, and untreated sewage has resulted in environmental problems.

Several foreign governments and analysts have stated that a large share of the business enterprise was controlled by Gaddafi, his family, and the government. A leaked US diplomatic cable said that the Libyan economy was "a kleptocracy in which the government – either the Gaddafi family itself or its close political allies – has a direct stake in anything worth buying, selling or owning". According to US officials, Gaddafi amassed a vast personal fortune during his 42-year leadership. The New York Times pointed to Gaddafi's relatives adopting lavish lifestyles, including luxurious homes, Hollywood film investments, and private parties with American pop stars.

Gaddafi said that he planned to combat corruption in the state by proposing reforms where oil profits are handed out directly to the country's five million people rather than to government bodies, stating that "as long as money is administered by a government body, there would be theft and corruption." Gaddafi urged a sweeping reform of the government bureaucracy, suggesting that most of the cabinet system should be dismantled to "free Libyans from red tape" and "protect the state's budget from corruption". According to Western diplomats, this move appeared to be aimed at putting pressure on the government to speed up reforms. In March 2008, Gaddafi proposed plans to dissolve the country's existing administrative structure and disburse oil revenue directly to the people. The plan included abolishing all ministries except those of defence, internal security, and foreign affairs, and departments implementing strategic projects. He stated that the ministries were failing to manage the country's oil revenues, and that his "dream during all these years was to give power and wealth directly to the people".

A national vote on Gaddafi's plan was held in 2009, where Libya's people's congresses, collectively the country's highest authority, voted to delay implementation. The General People's Congress announced that, of 468 Basic People's Congresses, 64 chose immediate implementation while 251 endorsed implementation "but asked for (it) to be delayed until appropriate measures were put in place". Some top government officials opposed the plan, saying that it would "wreak havoc" in the economy by "fanning inflation and spurring capital flight". Gaddafi acknowledged that the scheme, which promised up to 30,000 Libyan dinars ($23,000) annually to about a million of Libya's poorest, may "cause chaos before it brought about prosperity," but said "do not be afraid to experiment with a new form of government" and that "this plan is to offer a better future for Libya's children".

=== Human rights in Libya ===
In 2009 and 2011, the Freedom of the Press Index rated Libya the most-censored state in the Middle East and North Africa. In contrast, a January 2011 report of the United Nations Human Rights Council, on which the Libyan Arab Jamahiriya sat prior to the uprising, released a month before protests began, praised certain aspects of the country's human rights record, including its treatment of women and improvements in other areas.

The Libyan Arab Jamahiriya's delegation to the United Nations issued a report about human rights in Libya. The report said that the country was founded on direct people's democracy that guaranteed direct exercise of authority by all citizens through the people's congresses. Citizens were said to be able to express opinions to the congresses on political, economic, social, and cultural issues. In addition, the report stated that there were information platforms such as newspapers and TV channels for people to express their opinions through. Libyan authorities also argued that no one in the Libyan Arab Jamahiriya suffered from extreme poverty and hunger, and that the government guaranteed a minimum of food and essential needs to people with low incomes. In 2006, an initiative was adopted for providing people with low incomes investment portfolios amounting to $30,000 to be deposited with banks and companies.

The Revolutionary Committees occasionally kept tight control over internal dissent; reportedly, 10% to 20% of Libyans worked as informants for these committees, with surveillance taking place in the government, in factories, and in the education sector. The government sometimes executed dissidents through public hangings and mutilations and re-broadcast them on public television channels. Until the mid-1980s, Libya's intelligence service conducted assassinations of Libyan dissidents around the world.

In December 2009, Gaddafi reportedly told government officials that Libya would soon experience a "new political period" and would have elections for important positions such as minister-level roles and the National Security Advisor position (a Prime Minister equivalent). He also promised that international monitors would be included to ensure fair elections. His speech was said to have caused a stir. These elections were planned to coincide with the Jamahiriya's usual periodic elections for the Popular Committees, Basic People's Committees, Basic People's Congresses, and General People's Congresses, in 2010.

Dissent was illegal under Law 75 of 1973, and in 1974, Gaddafi asserted that anyone guilty of founding a political party would be executed. With the establishment of the Jamahiriya ("state of the masses") system in 1977, he established the Revolutionary Committees as conduits for raising political consciousness, with the aim of direct political participation by all Libyans rather than a traditional party-based representative system. In 1979, some of the Revolutionary Committees had eventually evolved into self-appointed, sometimes zealous, enforcers of revolutionary orthodoxy. During the early 1980s, the Revolutionary Committees had considerable power and became a growing source of tension within the Jamihiriya, to the extent that Gaddafi sometimes criticized their effectiveness and excessive repression, until the power of the Revolutionary Committees was eventually restricted in the late 1980s.

The Green Book, which Gaddafi authored in the 1970s, was for years the principal text of political education. BBC cited a Libyan who said that teachers who called it "rubbish" could face execution. "The Great Green Document on Human Rights treats the right to life as an individual human right and calls for abolition of the death sentence, except in the case of persons whose lives endanger or corrupt society."

In 1988, Gaddafi criticized the "excesses" he blamed on the Revolutionary Councils, stating that "they deviated, harmed, tortured" and that "the true revolutionary does not practise repression." That same year, the Libyan Arab Jamahiriya issued the Great Green Document on Human Rights, in which Article 5 established laws that allowed greater freedom of expression. Article 8 of The Code on the Promotion of Freedom stated that "each citizen has the right to express his opinions and ideas openly in People's Congresses and in all mass media." A number of restrictions were also allegedly placed on the power of the Revolutionary Committees by the Gaddafi government, leading to a resurgence in the Libyan state's popularity by the early 1990s. In 2004, however, Libya posted a $1 million bounty for journalist and governmental critic Ashur Shamis, under the allegation that he was linked to Al-Qaeda and terror suspect Abu Qatada.

== Anti-Gaddafi movement ==
=== Beginnings of protests ===
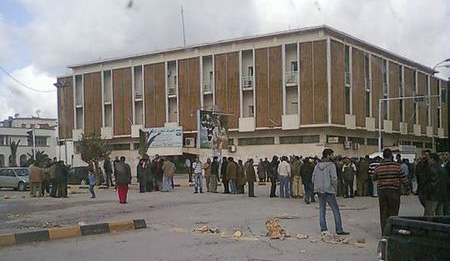
Protests on Al Oroba Street, Bayda, 13 January 2011

The flag of the former Kingdom of Libya was used as an opposition flag.

Between 13 and 16 January 2011, upset at delays in the building of housing units and over political corruption, protesters in Bayda, Derna, Benghazi and other cities broke into, and occupied, housing that the government had been building. Protesters also clashed with police in Bayda and attacked government offices. By 27 January, the government had responded to the housing unrest with an over €20 billion investment fund to provide housing and development.

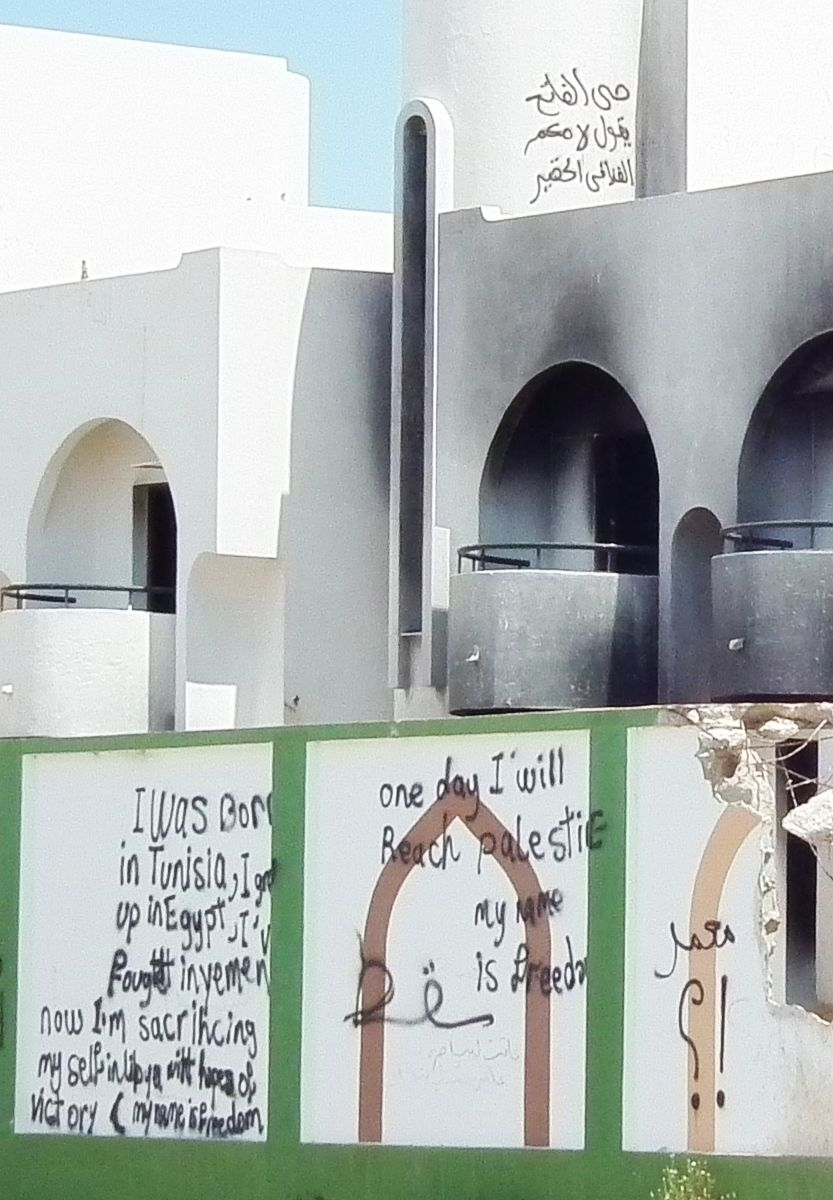
Graffiti in Benghazi, drawing the connection to the Arab Spring

In late January, Jamal al-Hajji, a writer, political commentator and accountant, "call[ed] on the Internet for demonstrations to be held in support of greater freedoms in Libya" inspired by the Tunisian and Egyptian revolutions. He was arrested on 1 February by plain-clothes police officers, and charged on 3 February with injuring someone with his car. Amnesty International stated that because al-Hajji had previously been imprisoned for his non-violent political opinions, the real reason for the present arrest appeared to be his call for demonstrations. In early February, Gaddafi, on behalf of the Jamahiriya, met with political activists, journalists and media figures and warned them that they would be held responsible if they disturbed the peace or created chaos in Libya.

The protests would lead to an uprising and civil war, as part of the wider Arab Spring, which had already resulted in the ousting of long-term presidents of adjacent Tunisia and Egypt. Social media played a central role in organizing the opposition. A social media website declared an alternative government, one that would be an interim national council, was the first to compete with Muammar Gaddafi's political authority. Gaddafi's senior advisor attempted to reject the idea by tweeting his resignation.

=== Uprising and civil war ===
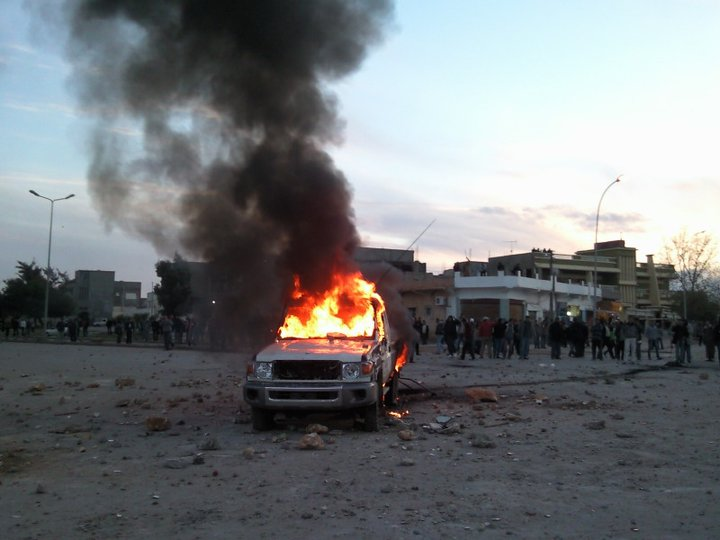
The first demonstrations in Bayda. A police car burns on 16 February 2011, at the crossroads of At-Talhi, now known as the Crossroads of the Spark.

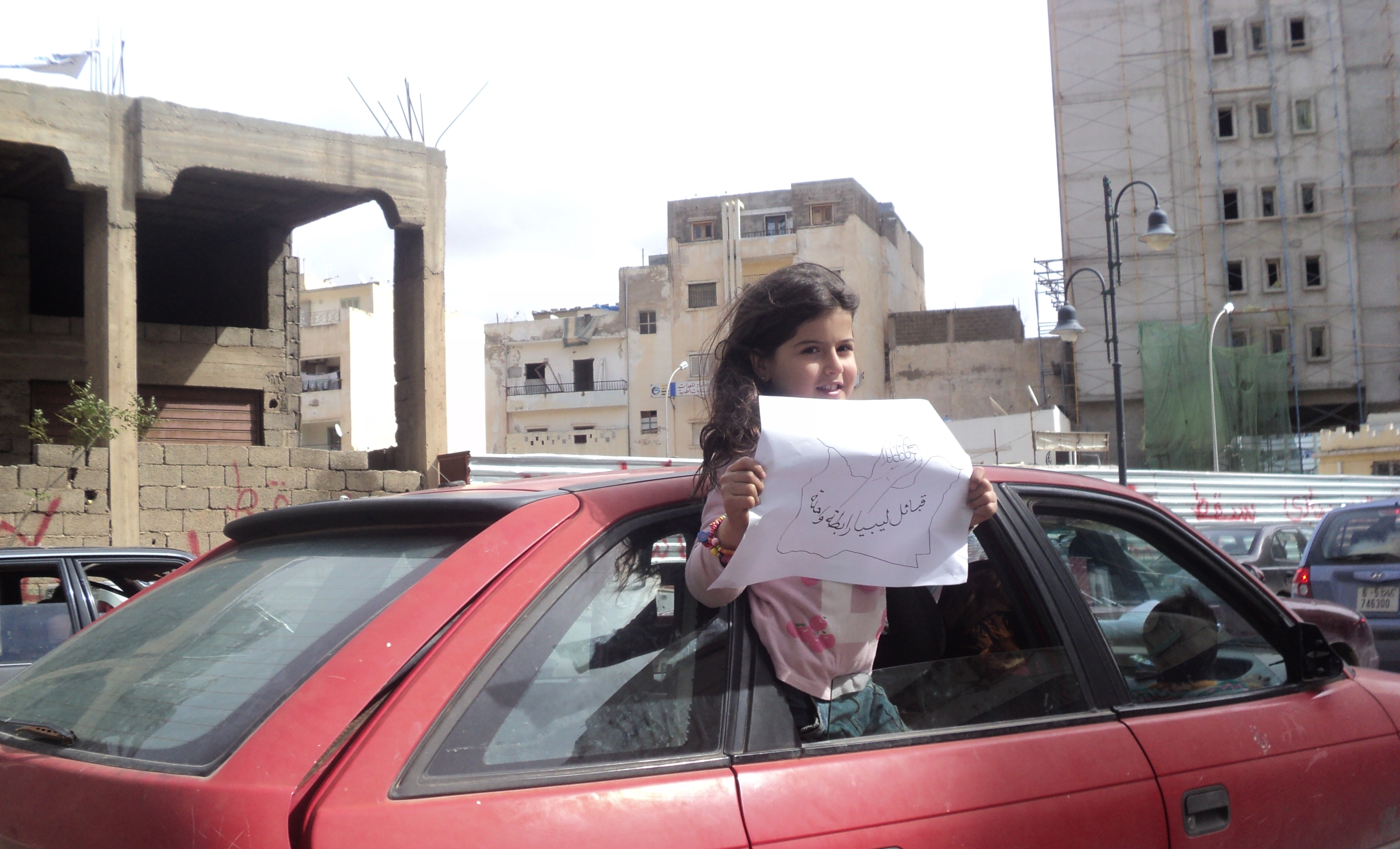
A girl in Benghazi with a placard saying that the Libyan tribes are united, on 23 February 2011.

The protests, unrest and confrontations began in earnest on 2 February 2011. They were soon nicknamed the Libyan Revolution of Dignity by the protesters and foreign media. Foreign workers and disgruntled minorities protested in the main square of Zawiya, Libya against the local administration. This was succeeded by race riots, which were squashed by the police and pro-Gaddafi loyalists. On the evening of 15 February, between 500 and 600 demonstrators protested in front of Benghazi's police headquarters after the arrest of human rights lawyer Fathi Terbil. Crowds were armed with petrol bombs and threw stones. Marchers hurled Molotov cocktails in a downtown square in Benghazi, damaging cars, blocking roads, and hurling rocks. Police responded to crowds with tear gas, water cannon, and rubber bullets. 38 people were injured, including 10 security personnel. The novelist Idris Al-Mesmari was arrested hours after giving an interview with Al Jazeera about the police reaction to protests.

In a statement released after clashes in Benghazi, a Libyan official warned that the Government "will not allow a group of people to move around at night and play with the security of Libya". The statement added: "The clashes last night were between small groups of people – up to 150. Some outsiders infiltrated that group. They were trying to corrupt the local legal process which has long been in place. We will not permit that at all, and we call on Libyans to voice their issues through existing channels, even if it is to call for the downfall of the government."

On the night of 16 February in Bayda, Zawiya and Zintan, hundreds of protesters in each town calling for an end to the Gaddafi government set fire to police and security buildings.

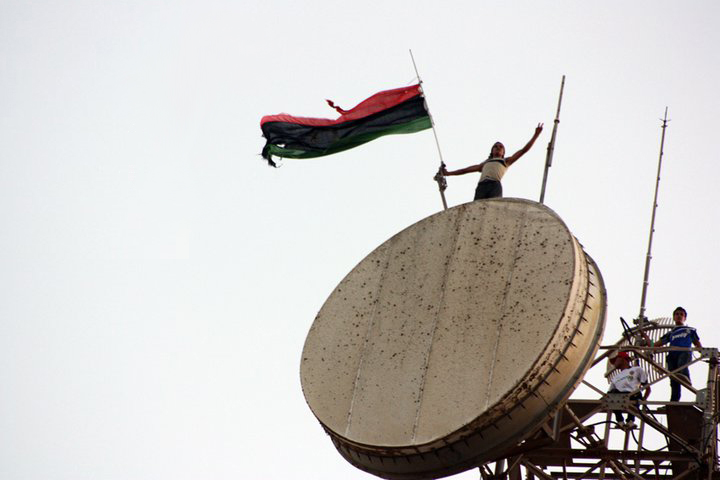
The Libyan National Transitional Council flag is flown from a communications tower in Bayda in July.

A "Day of Rage" in Libya and by Libyans in exile was planned for 17 February. The National Conference for the Libyan Opposition asked that all groups opposed to the Gaddafi government protest on 17 February in memory of demonstrations in Benghazi five years earlier. The plans to protest were inspired by the Tunisian and Egyptian revolution. Protests took place in Benghazi, Ajdabiya, Derna, Zintan, and Bayda. Libyan security forces fired live ammunition into the armed protests. Protesters torched a number of government buildings, including a police station. In Tripoli, television and public radio stations had been sacked, and protesters set fire to security buildings, Revolutionary Committee offices, the interior ministry building, and the People's Hall.

On 18 February, police and army personnel later withdrew from Benghazi after being overwhelmed by protesters. Some army personnel also joined the protesters; they then seized the local radio station. In Bayda, unconfirmed reports indicated that the local police force and riot-control units had joined the protesters. On 19 February, witnesses in Libya reported helicopters firing into crowds of anti-government protesters. The army withdrew from the city of Bayda.

=== Cultural revolt ===
'Al-Soo'al' (The Question)

Muammar: You have never served the people
Muammar: You'd better give up
Confess. You cannot escape
Our revenge will catch you
As a train roars through a wall
We will drown you.

Rap, hip hop and traditional music, alongside other genres, played a big role in encouraging dissent against Gaddafi's government. Music has been controlled and dissenting cultural figures have been arrested or tortured in Arab Spring countries, including Libya. Music provided an important platform for communication among demonstrators. It helped to create moral support and encouraged a spirit of revolt against the governments.

An anonymous hip hop artist called Ibn Thabit gave a voice to "disenfranchised Libyans looking for a non-violent way to express their political will". On his website, Ibn Thabit said that he "has been attacking Gaddafi with his music since 2008" when he posted his first song on the internet, titled "Moammar – the coward". Lyrics of a song 'Al-Soo'al' released by Ibn Thabit on YouTube on 27 January 2011, weeks before the riots began in Libya were indicative of the rebel sentiment.

Some groups, such as a rock band from Benghazi called the "Guys Underground", used metaphors to cloak the censure of the authorities. The group released a song just before the uprising entitled "Like My Father Always Says" to ridicule an autocratic fictional male head of a family which was a veiled reference to Colonel Gaddafi.

=== Organization ===
Libyan Boy Scouts helping in the social services in Benghazi.

Many opposition participants called for a return to the 1952 constitution and a transition to multi-party democracy. Military units who joined the rebellion and many volunteers formed fighting units to defend against Jamahiriya attacks and to work to bring Tripoli under the influence of Jalil. In Tobruk, volunteers turned a former headquarters of the government into a centre for helping protesters. Volunteers reportedly guarded the port, local banks and oil terminals to keep the oil flowing. Teachers and engineers set up a committee to collect weapons. Likewise, supply lines were run by volunteers. For example, in Misrata people organised a pizza service which delivered up to 8,000 pizzas a day to fighters.

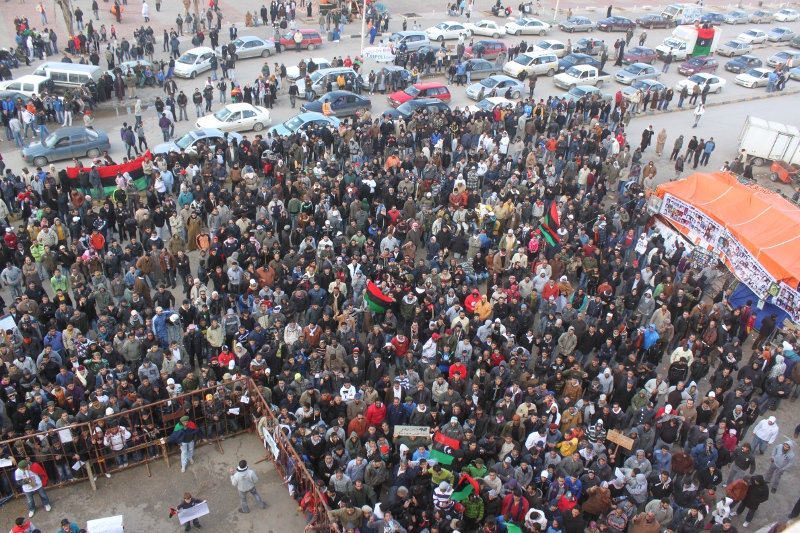
A few hundred anti-Gaddafi protesters in Benghazi, 25 February 2011

The National Transitional Council (Arabic: المجلس الوطني الانتقالي) was established on 27 February to consolidate efforts for change in the rule of Libya. The main objectives of the group was to co-ordinate resistance between towns held in rebel control, and represent the opposition to the world, but did not include forming an interim government. The Benghazi-based opposition government had called for a no-fly zone and airstrikes against the Jamahiriya. The council began to refer to itself as the Libyan Republic and by March had a website. Former Jamahiriya Justice Minister Mustafa Abdul Jalil said in February that the new government would prepare for elections and they could be held in three months. On 29 March, the political and international affairs committee of the Council presented its eight-point plan for Libya in The Guardian newspaper, stating they would hold free and fair elections and draft a national constitution.

An independent newspaper called Libya appeared in Benghazi, as well as rebel-controlled radio stations. Some of the rebels opposed tribalism and wore vests bearing slogans such as "No to tribalism, no to factionalism". Some Libyans said that they had found abandoned torture chambers and devices that had been used in the past.

=== Composition of rebel forces ===
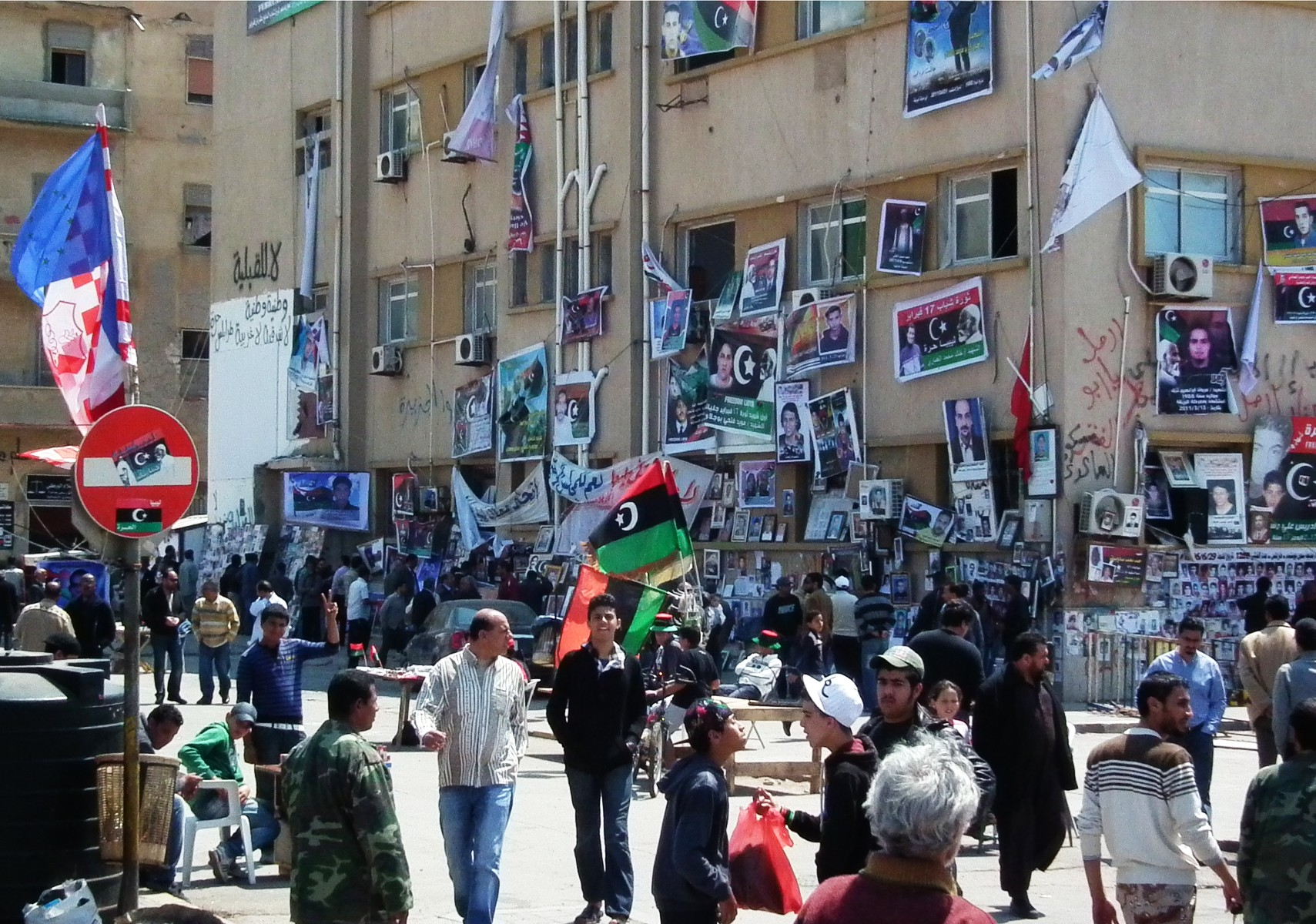
Court square in Benghazi, 19 April 2011. At the central place for gatherings and demonstrations the walls are draped with pictures of casualties, mourners passing by.

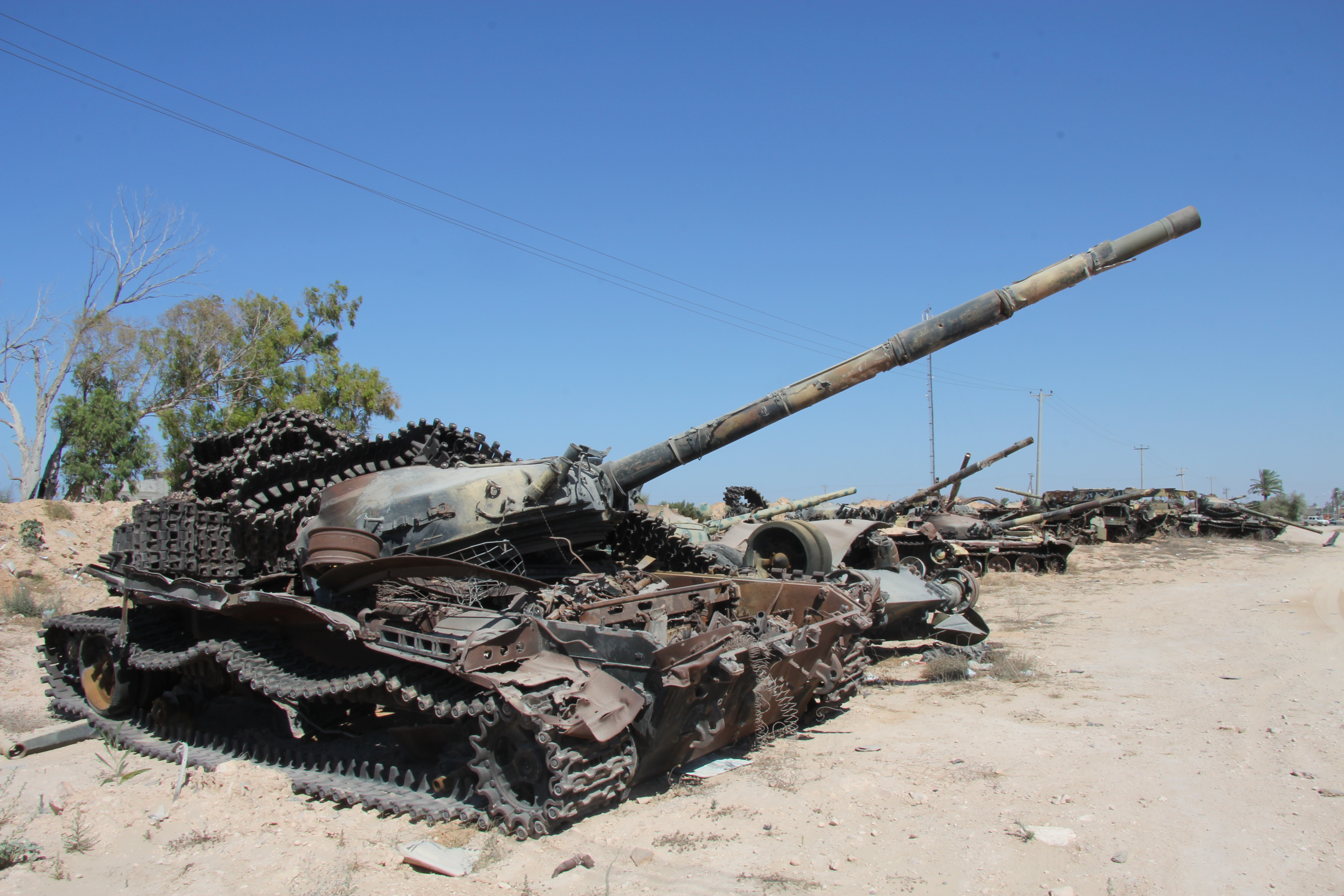
Destroyed tanks in a scrap yard outside Misrata

The rebels primarily included civilians, such as teachers, students, lawyers, and oil workers, but also defected police officers and professional soldiers. Many Islamists were part of the rebel movement in both eastern and western Libya. Rebel groups primarily initiated from Misrati, Zentan and Derna. In Benghazi "the February 17 Brigade" was a powerful Islamist group composed of 12 different brigades. The Libya Shield was based out of Mistrata and Zaria. There was also the Libyan Islamic Fighting Group and the Obaida Ibn Jarrah Brigade which has been held responsible for the assassination of top rebel commander General Abdul Fatah Younis.

Gaddafi's administration repeatedly asserted that the rebels included al-Qaeda fighters. Rebels denied this. NATO's Supreme Allied Commander James G. Stavridis stated that intelligence reports suggested there were "flickers" of al-Qaeda activity among rebels, but that there was insufficient information to confirm a significant presence of terrorist groups. Gaddafi's claims are supported by a 2008 secret cable from the US embassy in Tripoli to the US State Department, and an analysis by the Combating Terrorism Center at the US Military Academy at West Point of a set of documents called the Sinjar Records, purporting to show a statistical study of the al-Qaeda personnel records. The West Point analysis of these documents concluded that Libya provided "far more" foreign fighters in per capita terms than any other country. A disclosed file from 2005 on WikiLeaks found that rebel leader Abu Sufian Ibrahim Ahmed Hamuda Bin Qumu was a former Guantanamo Bay detainee alleged to be a member of the Libyan Islamic Fighting Group, to have joined the Taliban in 1998, and that he was a "probable member of Al Qaida and a member of the African Extremist Network".

== State response ==
In the days leading up to the conflict, Gaddafi called for a rally against the government that was to be held on 17 February. The International Crisis Group believes this to have been a political manoeuvre to divert attention away from himself and the Jamahiriya political system towards government officials currently in power.

Later in February, Gaddafi stated that the rebels were influenced by Al-Qaeda, Osama bin Laden, and hallucinogenic drugs put in drinks and pills. He specifically referred to substances in milk, coffee, and Nescafé, and said that Bin Laden and Al-Qaeda were distributing these hallucinogenic drugs. He also blamed alcohol. Gaddafi later also stated that the revolt against his rule was the result of a colonialist plot by foreign states, particularly blaming France, the US and the UK, to control oil and enslave the Libyan people. He referred to the rebels as "cockroaches" and "rats", and vowed not to step down and to cleanse Libya house by house until the insurrection was crushed. He said that if the rebels laid down their arms, they would not be harmed. He also said that he had been receiving "thousands" of phone calls from Benghazi, from residents who were being held hostage and who wanted to be rescued. Gaddafi said in a speech addressed to Benghazi on 17 March 2011 that the rebels

"... can run away, they can go to Egypt...Those who would surrender their weapons and would join our side, we are the people of Libya. Those who surrender their weapons and would come without their arms, we would forgive them, and would have amnesty for those who put down their weapons. Anyone who throws his arms away and stays at home would be protected."

Libya's ambassador in Malta addressed that "many people instigating unrest were arrested. Libya will show that these belonged to Al Qaeda. Some young protestors were also misled. The government is ready to dialogue with them." He cited reports from the Libyan Foreign Ministry that up to 2,500 al-Qaeda foreign operatives have been working in eastern Libya and were mostly responsible for "stirring up trouble." He concluded, "What we saw in Tahrir Square, and in Tunisia, was a clear situation. But in Libya, there is something different."

He called himself a "warrior", and vowed to fight on and die a "martyr", and urged his supporters to leave their homes and attack rebels "in their lairs". Gaddafi said that he had not yet ordered the use of force, and threatened that "everything will burn" when he did. Responding to demands that he step down, he stated that he could not step down, as he held a purely symbolic position like Queen Elizabeth, and that the people were in power.

The Swedish peace research institute SIPRI reported flights between Tripoli and a dedicated military base in Belarus which only handles stockpiled weaponry and military equipment.

=== Violence ===
In a 17 March 2011 interview with ABC, shortly before the military intervention, Muammar Gaddafi's son and heir apparent Saif al-Islam Gaddafi said that "armed militia" fighters in Benghazi were killing children and terrorizing the population. He stated, "You know, the armoured militia yesterday, they killed four young boys in Benghazi. Why? Because they were against them. Everybody is terrified because of the armed militia. They live in terror. Nightmare. Armed people are everywhere. They have their own courts. They execute the people who are against them. No school. No hospital. No money. No banks."

The Libyan government were reported to have employed snipers, artillery, helicopter gunships, warplanes, anti-aircraft weaponry, and warships against demonstrations and funeral processions. It was also reported that security forces and foreign mercenaries repeatedly used firearms, including assault rifles and machine guns, as well as knives against protesters. Amnesty International initially reported that writers, intellectuals and other prominent opposition sympathizers disappeared during the early days of the conflict in Gaddafi-controlled cities, and that they may have been subjected to torture or execution.

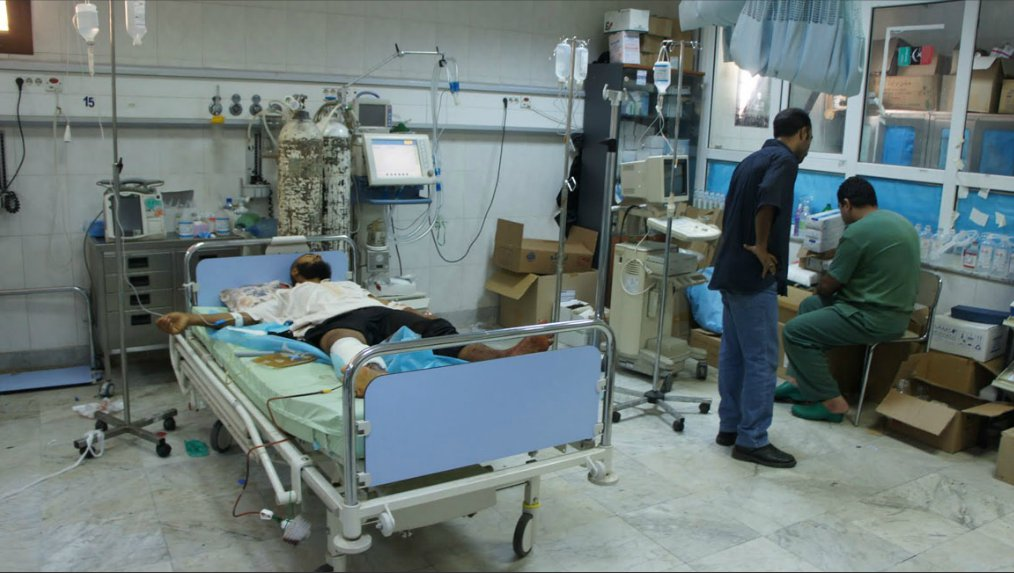
Rebel fighter in hospital in Tripoli

Amnesty International also reported that security forces targeted paramedics helping injured protesters. In multiple incidents, Gaddafi's forces were documented using ambulances in their attacks. Injured demonstrators were sometimes denied access to hospitals and ambulance transport. The government also banned giving blood transfusions to people who had taken part in the demonstrations. Security forces, including members of Gaddafi's Revolutionary Committees, stormed hospitals and removed the dead. Injured protesters were either summarily executed or had their oxygen masks, IV drips, and wires connected to the monitors removed. The dead and injured were piled into vehicles and taken away, possibly for cremation. Doctors were prevented from documenting the numbers of dead and wounded, but an orderly in a Tripoli hospital morgue estimated to the BBC that 600–700 protesters were killed in Green Square in Tripoli on 20 February. The orderly said that ambulances brought in three or four corpses at a time, and that after the ice lockers were filled to capacity, bodies were placed on stretchers or the floor, and that "it was in the same at the other hospitals".

In the eastern city of Bayda, anti-government forces hanged two policemen who were involved in trying to disperse demonstrations. In downtown Benghazi, anti-government forces killed the managing director of al-Galaa hospital. The victim's body showed signs of torture.

On 19 February, several days after the conflict began, Saif al-Islam Gaddafi announced the creation of a commission of inquiry into the violence, chaired by a Libyan judge, as reported on state television. He stated that the commission was intended to be "for members of Libyan and foreign organizations of human rights" and that it will "investigate the circumstances and events that have caused many victims."

Towards the end of February, it was reported that the Gaddafi government had suppressed protests in Tripoli by distributing automobiles, money and weapons for hired followers to drive around Tripoli and attack people showing signs of dissent. In Tripoli, "death squads" of mercenaries and Revolutionary Committees members reportedly patrolled the streets and shot people who tried to take the dead off the streets or gather in groups. The International Federation for Human Rights concluded on 24 February that Gaddafi was implementing a scorched earth strategy. The organization stated that "It is reasonable to fear that he has, in fact, decided to largely eliminate, wherever he still can, Libyan citizens who stood up against his regime and furthermore, to systematically and indiscriminately repress civilians. These acts can be characterized as crimes against humanity, as defined in Article 7 of the Rome Statute of the International Criminal Court."

In May 2011, International Criminal Court (ICC) chief prosecutor Luis Moreno-Ocampo estimated that 500–700 people were killed by security forces in February 2011, before the rebels took up arms. According to Moreno-Ocampo, "shooting at protesters was systematic".

During the siege of Misrata in May 2011, Amnesty International reported "horrifying" tactics such as "indiscriminate attacks that have led to massive civilian casualties, including use of heavy artillery, rockets and cluster bombs in civilian areas and sniper fire against residents." Gaddafi's military commanders also reportedly executed soldiers who refused to fire on protesters. The International Federation for Human Rights reported a case where 130 soldiers were executed. Some of the soldiers executed by their commanders were reportedly burned alive.

In June 2011, a more detailed investigation by Amnesty International found that many of the allegations against Gaddafi and the Libyan state turned out to be false or to lack any credible evidence, saying that rebels at times appeared to have knowingly made false claims or manufactured evidence.

In July 2011, Saif al-Islam Gaddafi had an interview with Russia Today in which he denied the ICC's allegations that he or his father Muammar Gaddafi ordered the killing of civilian protesters. He said that he was not a member of the government or the military and therefore had no authority to give such orders. He also said that his father made recorded calls to General Abdul Fatah Younis, who later defected to the rebel forces, in order to request not to use force against protesters, to which he said Fatah Younis responded that protesters were attacking a military site and soldiers were acting in self-defense.

=== Prison sites and torture ===
Gaddafi reportedly imprisoned thousands or tens of thousands of residents in Tripoli, with the Red Cross denied access to these hidden prisons. One of the most notorious is a prison which was set up in a tobacco factory in Tripoli where inmates are reported to have been fed just half a loaf of bread and a bottle of water a day.

In late April, United States Ambassador to the United Nations Susan Rice alleged that soldiers loyal to Gaddafi were given Viagra and encouraged to commit rapes in rebel-held or disputed areas. The allegations surfaced in an Al Jazeera report the previous month from Libya-based doctors, who claimed to have found Viagra in the pockets of government soldiers. Human rights groups and aid workers had previously documented rapes by loyalist fighters during the war. The British aid agency "Save the children" said it got reports that children were raped by unknown perpetrators, but warned that these reports could not be confirmed.

In a questionnaire 259 refugee women reported that they had been raped by Gaddafi's soldiers, however the accounts of these women could not be independently verified as the psychologist who conducted the questionnaire said that "she had lost contact with them".

The validity of the rape allegations is questioned by Amnesty International, which has not found evidence to back up the claims and said that there are indications that on several occasions the rebels in Benghazi appeared to have knowingly made false claims or manufactured evidence.

=== Mercenaries ===
The Libyan government alleged that the armed rebellion was composed of "criminal gangs and mercenaries." A Libyan official reported to Libyan television that security forces arrested Tunisians and Egyptians that were "trained to sow chaos." According to the Libyan Government authorities, mercenaries from Turkey, Egypt, and Tunisia entered Libya to fight on the side of the rebels. Dozens of them were arrested. Libya's Jamahiriya News Agency reported that the detained men were part of a "foreign network (and were) trained to damage Libya's stability, the safety of its citizens and national unity."

Military advisors from Qatar participated on the side of the rebels, and were sometimes labelled as "mercenaries" by the media. However, Qatar's role was certainly much greater than that. Initially, Qatari Prime Minister Sheikh Hamad bin Jassim al-Thani declared that the country was supporting the rebels by sending "defensive weaponry" only. A report by Sam Dagher, Charles Levinson, and Margaret Coker published by The Wall Street Journal on 17 October 2011 challenged those statements, and posited that "Qatar provided anti-Gadhafi rebels with what Libyan officials now estimate are tens of millions of dollars in aid, military training and more than 20,000 tons of weapons."

The three columnists reported anonymous sources described as "people familiar with the shipments" who confirmed that 18 weapons shipments were delivered to rebel forces between spring and summer 2011, mostly independently from the mediation of the National Transitional Council. In fact, most shipments for which Qatar paid went directly to the rebels.

According to NTC-allied officials interviewed by The Wall Street Journal, a few key figures facilitated Qatar's weapons and aid to flow directly to the rebels. Cleric Ali al-Sallabi allegedly served as a primary "conduit for Qatari humanitarian aid, money and arms" and helped to direct more than a dozen of the Qatari shipments. His brother Ismail al-Salabi, leader of the Islamist "February 17 Katiba" rebel faction, was believed to be financially backed from Qatar.

Abdel Hakim Belhaj, the leader of Tripoli Military Council who had previously served as the leader of the 2004 U.S. terrorist-designated Libyan Islamic Fighting Group (LIFG), was among the privileged recipients of shipments from Qatar. Jalal al-Dugheily, the NTC Defence Minister, was a Libyan army veteran who reportedly favoured Islamist militia leaders. According to David Roberts' analysis published by Foreign Policy, Belhaj – a "politically radioactive personality" – met with NATO officials at the end of August 2011 "under Qatar auspices."

Over ten ammunition shipments sponsored by Qatar were allegedly delivered to anti-Gaddhafi forces via Sudan. Dagher, Levinson, and Coker also wrote that some government officials in Tripoli claimed that Ghaddafi's fall did not cause those shipments to be suspended. Weapons allegedly continued to be delivered to Islamist groups also in September 2011, after the removal of Libya's government.

Qatar provided training to fighters based both in eastern Libya and in the Nafusa Mountains, in the Tripoli area. David Roberts reported that Libyan fighters were even brought back to Doha for special training. Finally, on 24 August 2011, "Qatari special forces" were involved in the final assault on Bab al-Azizia compound.

After clashes between Government and anti-government forces, allegations arose of the Libyan Gaddafi using foreign mercenaries. The Libyan Government's ambassador to India Ali al-Essawi said that the defections of military units had indeed led to such a decision. Video footage purporting to show this started to leak out of the country. Gaddafi's former Chief of Protocol Nouri Al Mesmari said in an interview with the Al Jazeera that Nigerien, Malian, Chadian and Kenyan mercenaries were among foreign soldiers helping fight the uprising on behalf of Gaddafi. Chadian sources repudiated allegations that mercenaries from Chad were involved in the fighting in Libya. The Chadian Ministry of Foreign Affairs in a statement said that "Chadians are not sent or recruited in Chad to serve as mercenaries in Libya," and that allegations about Chadian mercenaries were "likely to cause serious physical and material harm to Chadians residing in Libya."

According to African Union chairman Jean Ping, the "NTC seems to confuse black people with mercenaries". Ping said that for the rebels, "All blacks are mercenaries. If you do that, it means (that the) one-third of the population of Libya, which is black, is also mercenaries. They are killing people, normal workers, mistreating them."

Reports claiming that Sahrawi mercenaries have been contracted by Gaddafi in 2011 have been vehemently refuted by the Polisario Front and remain unsubstantiated to date.

In Mali, members of the Tuareg tribe confirmed that a large number of men, about 5,000, from the tribe went to Libya in late February. Locals in Mali said they were promised €7,500 ($10,000) upfront payment and compensation up to €750 ($1,000) per day. Gaddafi has used Malian Tuaregs in his political projects before, sending them to fight in places like Chad, Sudan and Lebanon and recently they have fought against the Niger government, a war which Gaddafi has reportedly sponsored. Malian government officials told BBC that it is hard to stop the flow of fighters from Mali to Libya. A recruitment center for Malian soldiers leaving to Libya was found in a Bamako hotel.

Reports from Ghana state that the men who went to Libya were offered as much as €1950 ($2,500) per day. Advertisements seeking mercenaries were seen in Nigeria with at least one female Nigerian pro-Gaddafi sniper being caught in late August outside Tripoli. One group of mercenaries from Niger, who had been allegedly recruited from the streets with promises of money, included a soldier of just 13 years old. The Daily Telegraph studied the case of a 16-year-old captured Chadian child soldier in Bayda. The boy, who had previously been a shepherd in Chad, told that a Libyan man had offered him a job and a free flight to Tripoli, but in the end he had been airlifted to shoot opposition members in Eastern Libya.

Reports by EU experts stated that Gaddafi's government hired between 300 and 500 European soldiers, including some from EU countries, at high wages. According to Michel Koutouzis, who does research on security issues for the EU institutions, the UN and the French government, "In Libyan society, there is a taboo against killing people from your own tribal group. This is one reason why Gaddafi needs foreign fighters," Rumours of Serbian mercenary pilots participating on the side of Gaddafi appeared early in the conflict. Time magazine interviewed mercenaries from ex-Yugoslavia who fled Gaddafi's forces in August.

A witness stated that mercenaries were more willing to kill demonstrators than Libyan forces were, and earned a reputation as among the most brutal forces employed by the government. A doctor in Benghazi said of the mercenaries that "they know one thing: to kill who is in front of them. Nothing else. They're killing people in cold blood".

On 7 April, Reuters reported that soldiers loyal to Gaddafi were sent into refugee camps to intimidate and bribe black African migrant workers into fighting for the Libyan state during the war. Some of these "mercenaries" were compelled to fight against their wishes, according to a source inside one of the refugee camps.

In June 2011, Amnesty International said it found no evidence of foreign mercenaries being used, saying the black Africans said to be "mercenaries" were in fact "sub-Saharan migrants working in Libya," and described the use of mercenaries as a "myth" that "inflamed public opinion" and led to lynchings and executions of black Africans by rebel forces. Human Rights Watch has countered that while many foreign migrants were erroneously accused of fighting with Gaddafi, there were also genuine mercenaries from several nations who participated in the conflict.

In October 2011, it was reported that the South African government was investigating the possibility that Gaddafi hired South African mercenaries to help him escape the besieged city of Sirte, where he was ultimately caught. It is thought that two South African mercenaries died in that operation from a NATO air strike on Gaddafi's convoy. One of the alleged mercenaries speaking from a hospital in North Africa stated that around 19 South Africans had been contracted by different companies for the operation.

=== Censorship of events ===
A subsidiary of Bull developed a software called Eagle which enabled Gaddafi to monitor internet traffic and which was implemented in Libya in 2008 and with better performance in 2010. Gaddafi shut down all Internet communications in Libya, and arrested Libyans who had given phone interviews to the media. International journalists were banned by the Libyan authorities from reporting from Libya except by invitation of the Gaddafi government. On 21 February, The New York Times reported that Gaddafi had tried to impose a blackout on information from Libya. Several residents reported that cellphone service was down, and even landline phone service was sporadic. However, every day new footage made with cell phone cameras found its way to YouTube and the international media. Journalists and human rights researchers made daily phone calls to hundreds of civilians in government held territory.

In the city of Misrata, rebel leaders imposed restrictions on the foreign media. Journalists were prevented from travelling to the village of Dafniya and were turned back at rebel-held checkpoints. Journalists were only able to use officially approved translators.

International journalists who attempted to cover the events were attacked by Gaddafi's forces. A BBC News crew was beaten and lined up against a wall by Gaddafi's soldiers, who then shot next to a journalist's ear and laughed at them. A journalist working for The Guardian and another Brazilian journalist have been detained. An Al-Jazeera journalist Ali Hassan al-Jaber was murdered, and was apparently deliberately targeted. Gaddafi's soldiers held four New York Times journalists – Lynsey Addario, Anthony Shadid, Stephen Farrell and Tyler Hicks – in captivity for a week. Libyan citizen journalist Mohammed Nabbous was shot in the head by Gaddafi's soldiers soon after exposing the Gaddafi government's false reports related to the cease-fire declaration.

=== International media ===
After the uprising began, Libyan students studying in the United States allegedly received phone calls from the Libyan embassy, instructing them to join pro-Gaddafi rallies, and threatening the loss of their government-funded scholarships if they refused. Gaddafi's ambassador denied the reports. A campaign in Serbia has organized people to spread pro-Gaddafi messages on the Internet.

Gaddafi's aides also organized tours for foreign journalists in Tripoli. The Economist correspondent in Tripoli noted "The picture presented by the regime often falls apart, fast. Coffins at funerals have sometimes turned out to be empty. Bombing sites are recycled. An injured seven-year-old in a hospital was the victim of a car crash, according to a note passed on surreptitiously by a nurse. Journalists who point out such blatant massaging of facts are harangued in the hotel corridors."

The Guardian described journalism in Gaddafi's Libya as "North Korea with palm trees". Journalists were not allowed to go anywhere, or talk to anyone, without authorization from Gaddafi's officials who always followed them. Journalists who did not report events the way Gaddafi's officials instructed faced problems and sudden deportations.

In June 2011, Amnesty International criticized "Western media coverage" which "has from the outset presented a very one-sided view of the logic of events, portraying the protest movement as entirely peaceful and repeatedly suggesting that the regime's security forces were unaccountably massacring unarmed demonstrators who presented no security challenge."

=== Human shields ===
Gaddafi forces reportedly surrounded themselves with civilians to protect themselves and key military sites like the Bab al-Azizia compound in Tripoli from air strikes. Amnesty International cited claims that Gaddafi had placed his tanks next to civilian facilities, using them as shields.

According to Libyan state television, the rebels used human shields in Misrata. The Jamahiriya News Agency reported on a speech delivered by Leader Gaddafi to Misrata tribes in Tripoli, in which he said that the rebels "used children and women as human shields. They took more than 100 children whose whereabouts we do not know – maybe to Europe, to be evangelised."

== Domestic responses ==
=== Resignation of government officials ===
In response to the use of force against protesters, a number of senior Libyan public officials either renounced the Gaddafi government or resigned from their positions. Justice Minister Mustafa Abdul Jalil and Interior Minister Major General Abdul Fatah Younis both defected to the opposition. Oil Minister Shukri Ghanem and Foreign Minister Moussa Koussa fled Libya, with the latter defecting to the UK. Libyan Prosecutor General Abdul-Rahman al-Abbar resigned from the post and joined the opposition.

The staff of a number of diplomatic missions of Libya have either resigned or condemned the actions of the Gaddafi government. The ambassadors to the Arab League, European Union and United Nations have either resigned or stated that they no longer support the government. The ambassadors to Australia, Bangladesh, Belgium, France, India, Indonesia, Malaysia, Nigeria, Portugal, Sweden, and the US also renounced the Gaddafi government or formally resigned.

=== Military defections ===
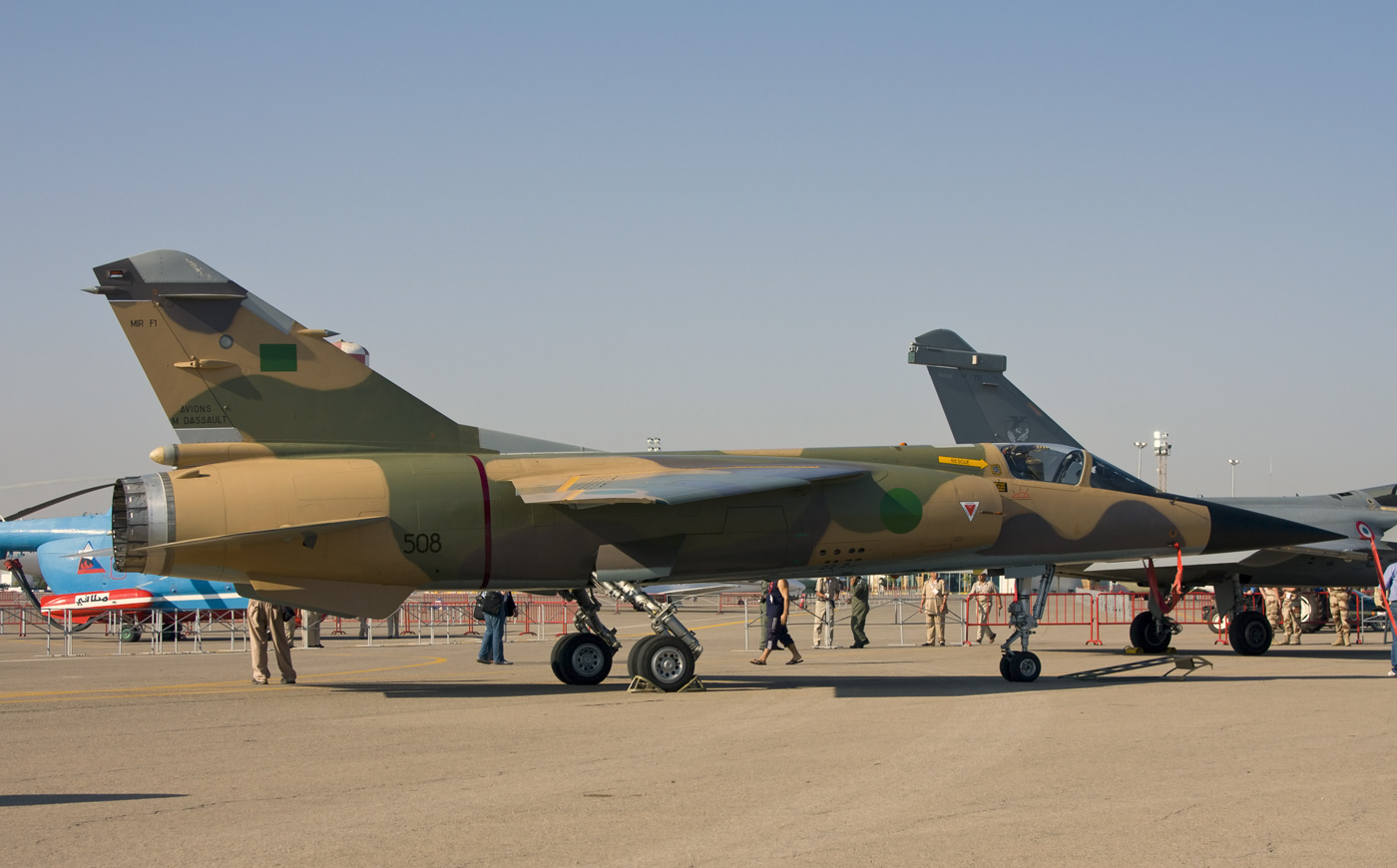
One of the two Dassault Mirage F1 that were flown to Malta.

A number of senior military officials defected to the opposition, including General Abdul Fatah Younis, General al-Barani Ashkal, Major General Suleiman Mahmoud, Brigadier General Musa'ed Ghaidan Al Mansouri, Brigadier General Hassan Ibrahim Al Qarawi and Brigadier General Dawood Issa Al Qafsi. Two Libyan Air Force colonels each flew their Mirage F1 fighter jets to Malta and requested asylum, after being ordered to carry out airstrikes against civilian protesters in Benghazi. Colonel Nuretin Hurala, the commander of the Benghazi Naval Base also defected along with senior naval officials.

=== Libyan royal family ===
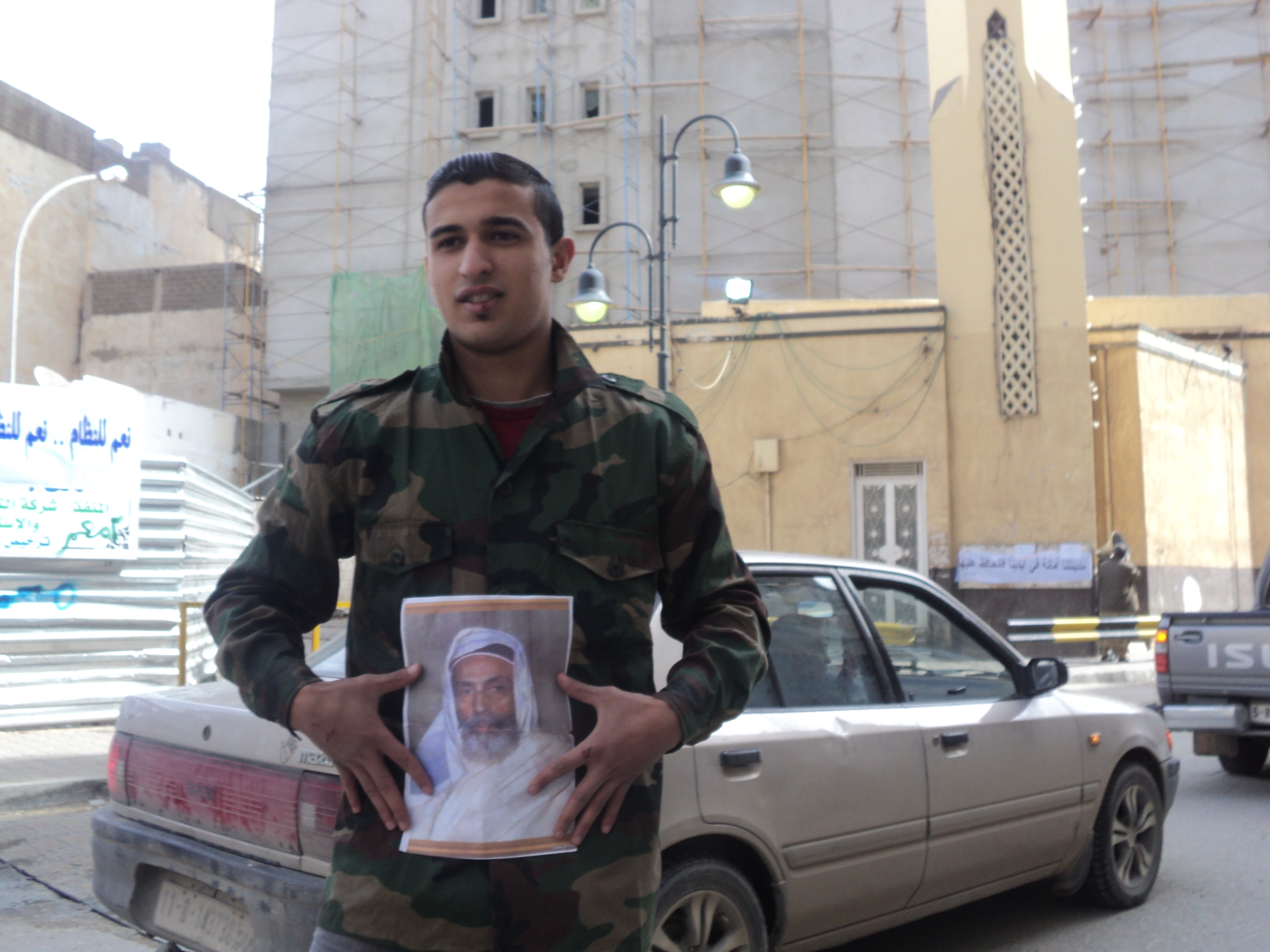
A young Benghazian carrying (deposed) King Idris' photo. Support of the Senussi dynasty has traditionally been strong in Cyrenaica.

Muhammad as-Senussi, son of the former Crown Prince and grand-nephew of the late King Idris, sent his condolences "for the heroes who have laid down their lives, killed by the brutal forces of Gaddafi" and called on the international community "to halt all support for the dictator with immediate effect." as-Senussi said that the protesters would be "victorious in the end" and calls for international support to end the violence. On 24 February, as-Senussi gave an interview to Al Jazeera where he called upon the international community to help remove Gaddafi from power and stop the ongoing "massacre". He dismissed talk of a civil war saying "The Libyan people and the tribes have proven they are united". He later stated that international community needs "less talk and more action" to stop the violence. He asked for a no-fly zone over Libya but does not support foreign ground troops. On 20 April, Mohammed spoke in front of the European Parliament calling for more support for Libya. He also stated that he will support any form of government that Libya will choose after Gaddafi including a constitutional monarchy.

A rival claimant to the throne, Idris bin Abdullah al-Senussi, announced in an interview with Adnkronos that he was ready to return to Libya and "assume leadership" once change had been initiated. On 21 February, he made an appearance on Piers Morgan Tonight to discuss the uprising. In March, it was reported Idris bin Abdullah had held meetings at the State Department and Congress in Washington with US government officials. It was also reported attempts at contact had been initiated by French and Saudi officials. On 3 March, it was reported that another member of the family, Prince Zouber al-Senussi, had fled Libya with his family and was seeking asylum in Totebo, Sweden.

== History ==
=== Course of the war ===
The course of the war Held by anti-Gaddafi forces by 1 March (Checkered: Lost before UN intervention) Contested areas between March and August Rebel western coastal offensive in August Rebel gains by 1 October Last loyalist pockets Major campaigns Battles

==== First weeks ====
By 23 February, Gaddafi was suffering from the resignations and defections of close allies, from the loss of Benghazi, the fall of Tobruk, Misrata, Bayda, Zawiya, Zuwara, Sabratha, Sorman, and mounting international isolation and pressure. By the end of February, Gaddafi's government had lost control of a significant part of Libya, including the major cities of Misrata and Benghazi, and the important harbours at Ra's Lanuf and Brega. But in early March, Gaddafi's forces pushed the rebels back and eventually reached Benghazi and Misrata. On 10 March, the president of the ICRC Jakob Kellenberger warned of the increase in the intensity of fighting and in the number of casualties arriving at hospitals in Ajdabiya and Misrata.

By 11 March, the Libyan Air Force was running out of quality jet fuel, and the government tried to bribe Maltese Air Force officials in order to buy fuel.

==== Foreign military intervention ====
The Royal Canadian Navy frigate HMCS Charlottetown was deployed to the Mediterranean off the coast of Libya on 2 March 2011, but did not take immediate action once arrived. Seventeen days later, a multi-state coalition began a military intervention in Libya to implement United Nations Security Council Resolution 1973, which was taken in response to events then occurring during the conflict. That same day, military operations began, with US forces and one British submarine firing cruise missiles. the Royal Canadian Air Force, French Air Force, United States Air Force, and British Royal Air Force undertaking sorties across Libya and a naval blockade by the Royal Navy.

From the beginning of the intervention, the coalition of Belgium, Canada, Denmark, France, Italy, Norway, Qatar, Spain, UK and US expanded to 17 states. Newer states mostly enforced the no-fly zone and naval blockade or provided military logistical assistance. The effort was initially largely led by the United States. NATO took control of the arms embargo on 23 March, named Operation Unified Protector. An attempt to unify the military command of the air campaign (while keeping political and strategic control with a small group), first failed due to objections by the French, German, and Turkish governments. On 24 March, NATO agreed to take control of the no-fly zone, while command of targeting ground units remained with coalition forces.

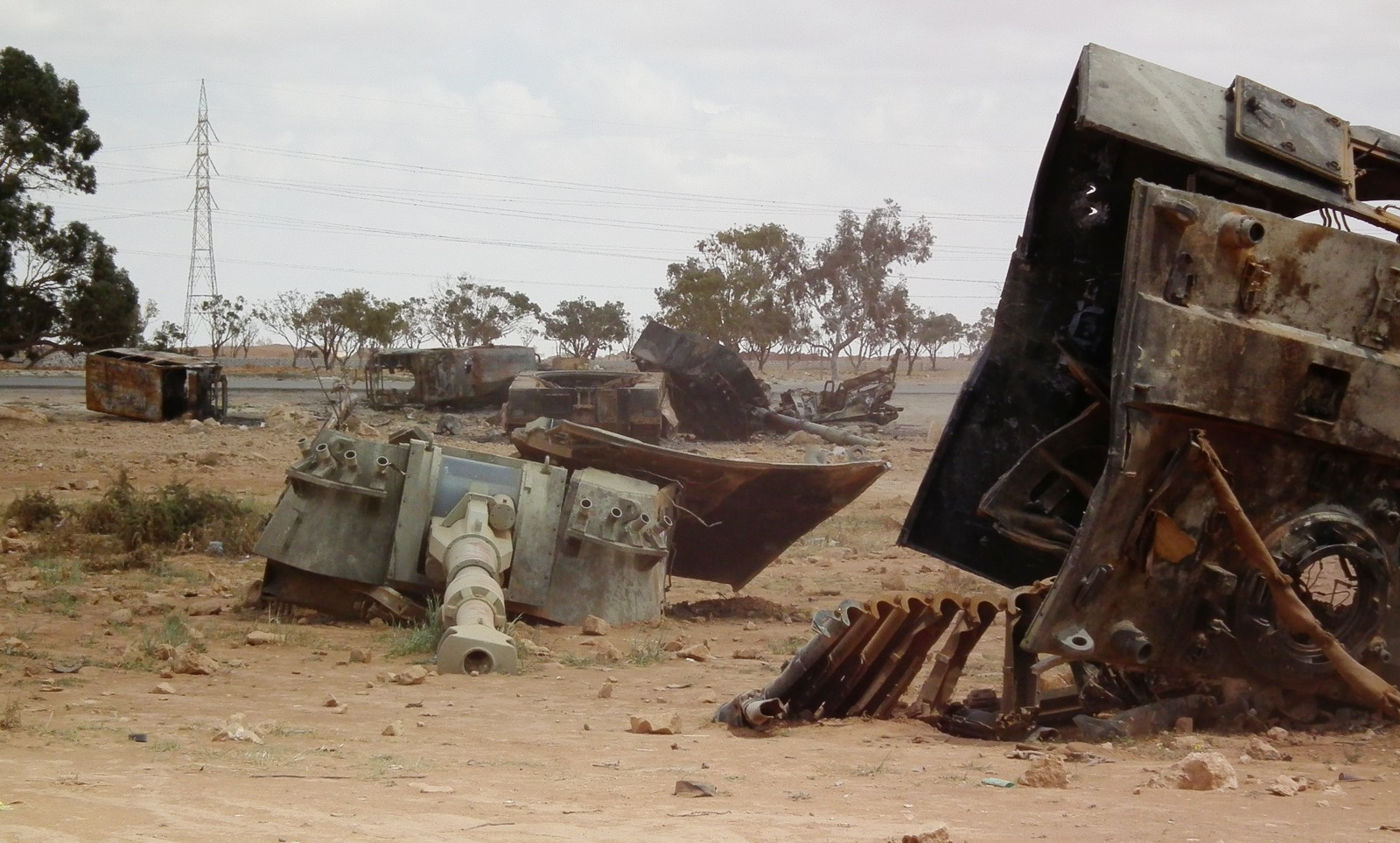
Loyalist Palmaria howitzers destroyed by the French air force near Benghazi in Opération Harmattan on 19 March 2011

In May 2011, when Gaddafi's forces were still fighting, and the result of the civil war was still uncertain, Putin and Dmitri Medvedev's Russian government recognized the National Transitional Council (NTC) of Libya as a legitimate dialogue partner. On 9 June 2011, some negotiators from NTC arrived in Beijing to have negotiations with the Chinese government.

In June 2011, Muammar Gaddafi and his son Saif al-Islam announced that they were willing to hold elections and that Gaddafi would step aside if he lost. Saif al-Islam stated that the elections could be held within three months and transparency would be guaranteed through international observers. NATO and the rebels rejected the offer, and NATO soon resumed bombardment of Tripoli.

In July 2011, Saif al-Islam accused NATO of bombing Libyan civilians, including his family members and their children, under the false pretence that their homes were military bases. He also stated that NATO offered to drop the ICC charges against him and his father if they accept a secret deal, an offer they rejected. He criticized the ICC as "a fake court" controlled by the NATO nations.

According to Phil Miller in Declassified UK, a 2022 book by Ian Martin, who ran the UN's support mission in Libya from 2011 to 2012, said that NATO's' deployments of special forces were "deliberately concealed" from the UN Security Council and that NATO failed to investigate civilian deaths from its bombing campaign and gave "unconvincing" arguments for promoting regime change in the name of protecting civilians. Martin writes "NATO operations had increasingly extended from preventing attacks by Gaddafi's forces to supporting rebel advances."

==== 20 August rebel offensive ====
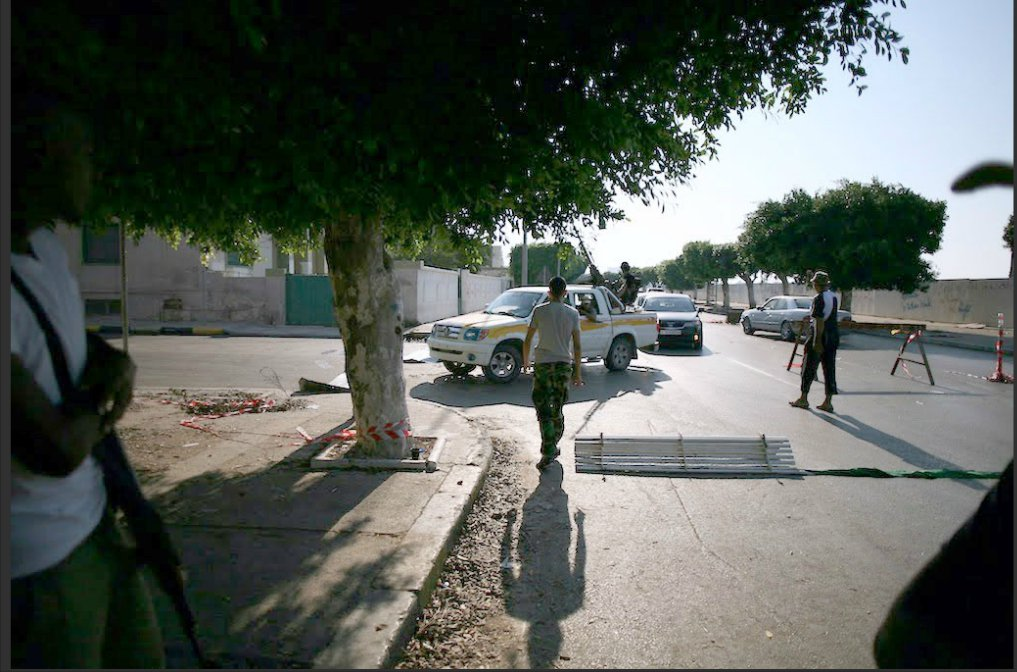
A rebel checkpoint in Tripoli on 26 August 2011

Heads of the rebellion reported on 21 August that Gaddafi's son, Saif al-Islam, was under arrest and that they had encircled the leader's compound, suggesting that the war had reached its endgame with an imminent rebel victory. By 22 August, rebel fighters had gained entrance into Tripoli and occupied Green Square, which was promptly renamed Martyrs' Square in memory of those who had died fighting in the civil war. Early on 23 August, Saif al-Islam appeared at the Gaddafi-controlled Rixos Hotel in central Tripoli and boasted his father was still in control. Later the same day, rebels blasted open the Bab al-Azizia compound in Tripoli through its north gates and stormed inside. Despite previous reports suggesting that Muammar Gaddafi may be inside, no members of the Gaddafi family were found.

Early the following day, 24 August, Gaddafi broadcast an address from a Tripoli local radio station in which he said the withdrawal from Bab al-Azizia had been a "tactical" move. The New York Times reported rebel leaders as saying they believed the only areas still under Gaddafi's control, other than the immediate neighbourhood of Bab al-Azizia, were al-Hadhba and Abu Salim, the latter including the Rixos Hotel where a group of foreign journalists had been trapped for days. However, the report noted the rebels lacked a unified command and that Gaddafi loyalists and snipers remained at large in many areas of Tripoli. Local hospitals and clinics, even in areas considered under rebel control, were reporting hundreds of cases of gunshot wounds and the death toll was impossible to estimate. By late afternoon the journalists trapped at the Rixos Hotel had been released while heavy fighting continued in the Abu Salim region close to Bab al-Azizia and elsewhere. The rebels were reported as estimating 400 people had been killed and a further 2,000 injured in the battle.

==== After Tripoli and NTC victory ====
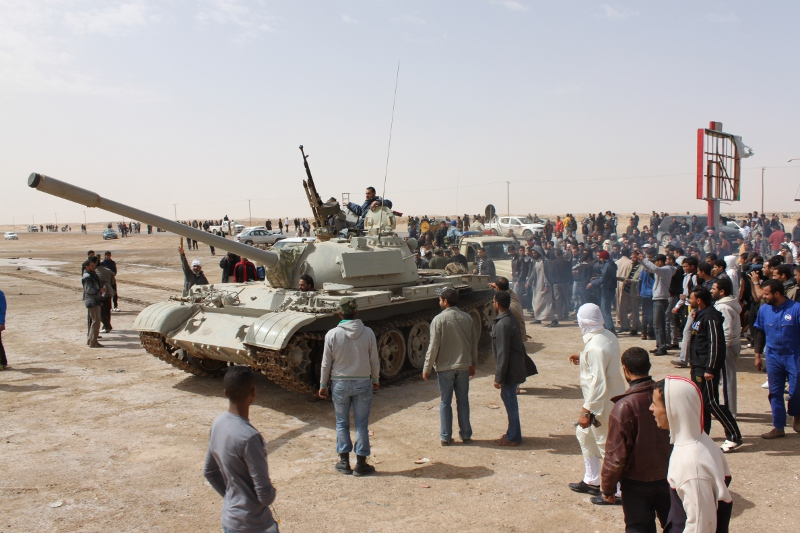
A rebel tank near Ajdabiya

Efforts to mop up pro-Gaddafi forces in northwestern Libya and toward Sirte began even before the rebels fully consolidated control of Tripoli. Rebels took the city of Ghadames near the borders of Tunisia and Algeria on 29 August. Members of the Gaddafi family took flight to Algeria. In September, the Gaddafi stronghold of Bani Walid was besieged by rebels, who reported that Gaddafi's son Saif al-Islam was hiding in the city. On 22 September, the NTC captured the southern city of Sabha, and claimed to have found a large cache of chemical weapons. Concerns were raised over the danger of Gaddafi mounting an insurgency against the new authorities.

By mid-October 2011, much of the city of Sirte had been taken by NTC forces, although fierce fighting continued around the city center, where many pro-Gaddafi fighters were encamped. The NTC captured the whole of Sirte on 20 October 2011, and reported that Gaddafi himself had been killed in the city. Some civilian Gaddafi supporters remaining in the city reported that women and children had been killed in crossfire or fired upon by rebel forces. There were also reports of harassment and theft by rebels; however, the rebel army indicated it would leave unarmed civilians "to their own devices", and had allowed families in the city access to supplies and medical assistance.

On 1 September, when Gaddafi lost his capital Tripoli but continued fighting, the Russian government under president Dmitry Medvedev and prime minister Vladimir Putin recognized the Libyan NTC as the only legal regime in Libya. On 5 September, Libyan NTC spokesman, Abdulrahman Busin, said the NTC had hard evidence that Gaddafi bought arms from China. Chinese Foreign Ministry spokeswoman Jiang Yu confirmed arms sales talks with Gaddafi forces, but no arms were delivered. On 12 September, the People's Republic of China also recognized the NTC as the only legal regime in Libya. Despite China and Russia abandoning their support of Gaddafi, an NTC spokesman said because of their long time support of Gaddafi, it will be very hard for a Chinese, Russian or Indian oil companies to acquire new exploration contracts.

== Aftermath ==
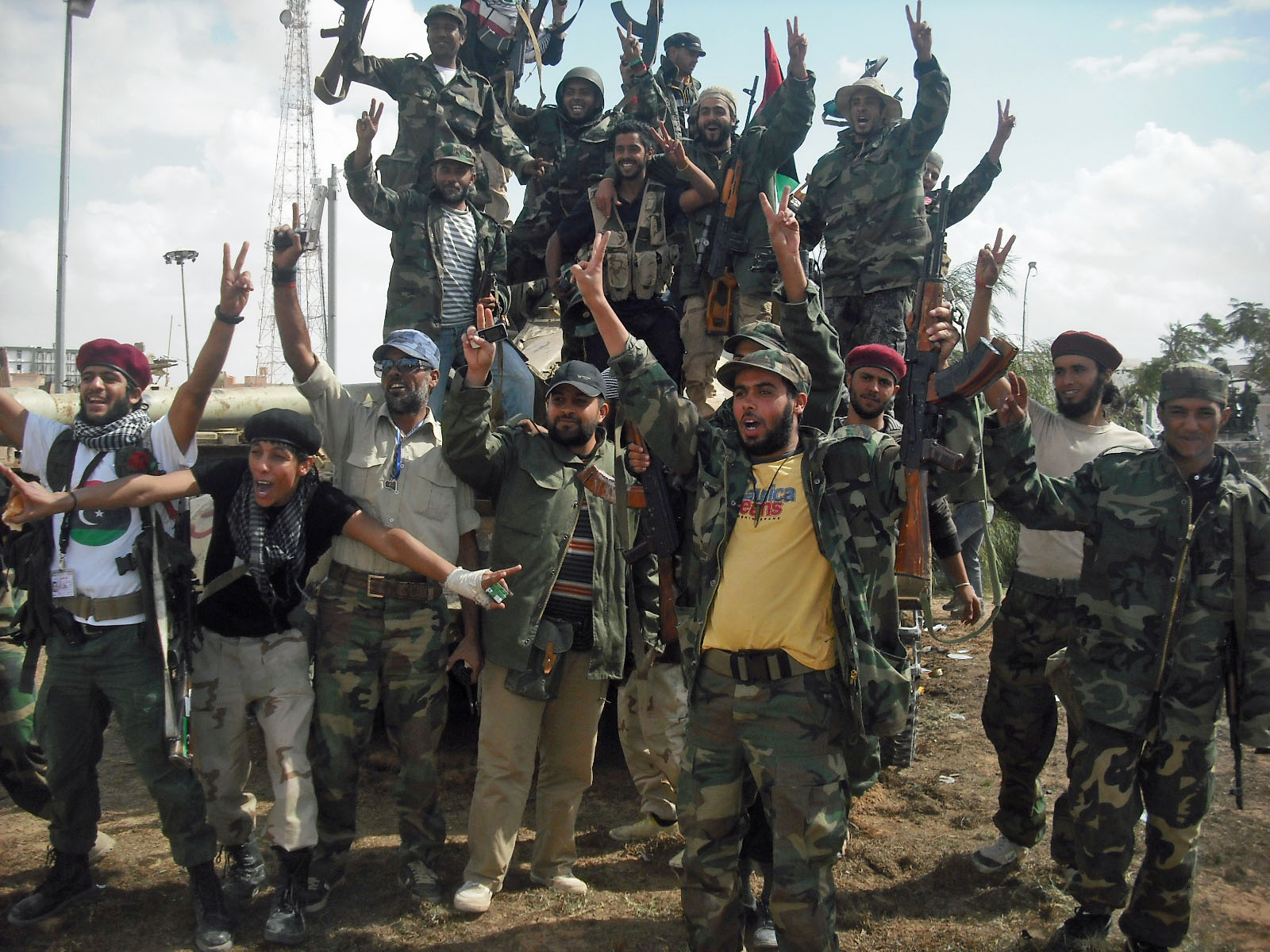
Libyan rebels after entering the town of Bani Walid

Despite the defeat of Gaddafi's loyalists, the capture of his last cities and Gaddafi's death, Saif al-Islam, Gaddafi's son and successor, remained hiding in the southern region of Libya until his capture in mid-November. In addition, some loyalist forces crossed into Niger, though the escape attempts exploded into violence when detected by Nigerien troops.

Sporadic clashes between NTC and former loyalists also continued across Libya with low intensity. On 23 November 2011, seven people were killed in clashes at Bani Walid, five of them among the revolutionary forces and one Gaddafi loyalist.

Fighting broke out on 3 January 2012, at a building used as intelligence headquarters by the Gaddafi government. Abdul Jalil, the chairman of NTC, warned Libyans that the country could descend into another civil war if they resort to force to settle their differences. It was reported that five people were killed and at least five injured in the events.

Also on 3 January, Libya's government named a retired general from Misrata, Yousel al-Manquosh, as head of the country's armed forces.

Bani Walid was captured by local tribal fighters on 23 January, due to the NTC's perceived inability to cooperate with them. The local forces were said to have used heavy weapons and numbered 100–150 men. Eight NTC fighters were killed and at least 25 wounded, with the rest fleeing the city. Clashes were also reported in Benghazi and Tripoli.

The NTC has functioned as an interim legislature during the transitional period. In early May 2012, it passed its most sweeping measures to date, granting immunity to former rebel fighters for acts committed during the civil war and ordering that all detainees accused of fighting for Gaddafi should be tried or released by 12 July 2012. It also adopted Law 37, prohibiting the publication of "propaganda" criticising the revolution, questioning the authority of Libya's governing organs, or praising Muammar Gaddafi, his family, his government, or the ideas of the Green Book.

A September 2013 report by The Independent shows that Libya had plunged into its worst political and economic crisis since the defeat of Gaddafi. The production of oil had almost completely stopped and the government had lost control of large areas of the country to the militias, while violence increased throughout the country. By May 2014, conflicts between several factions in Libya had descended into a second civil war.

Despite his eventual release from captivity, Saif al-Islam Gaddafi, who was also considered to be Muammar Gaddafi's main heir, would be eventually shot dead in February 2026. He would soon afterwards be buried in Bani Walid next to Khamis Gaddafi

== Impact ==
=== Casualties ===
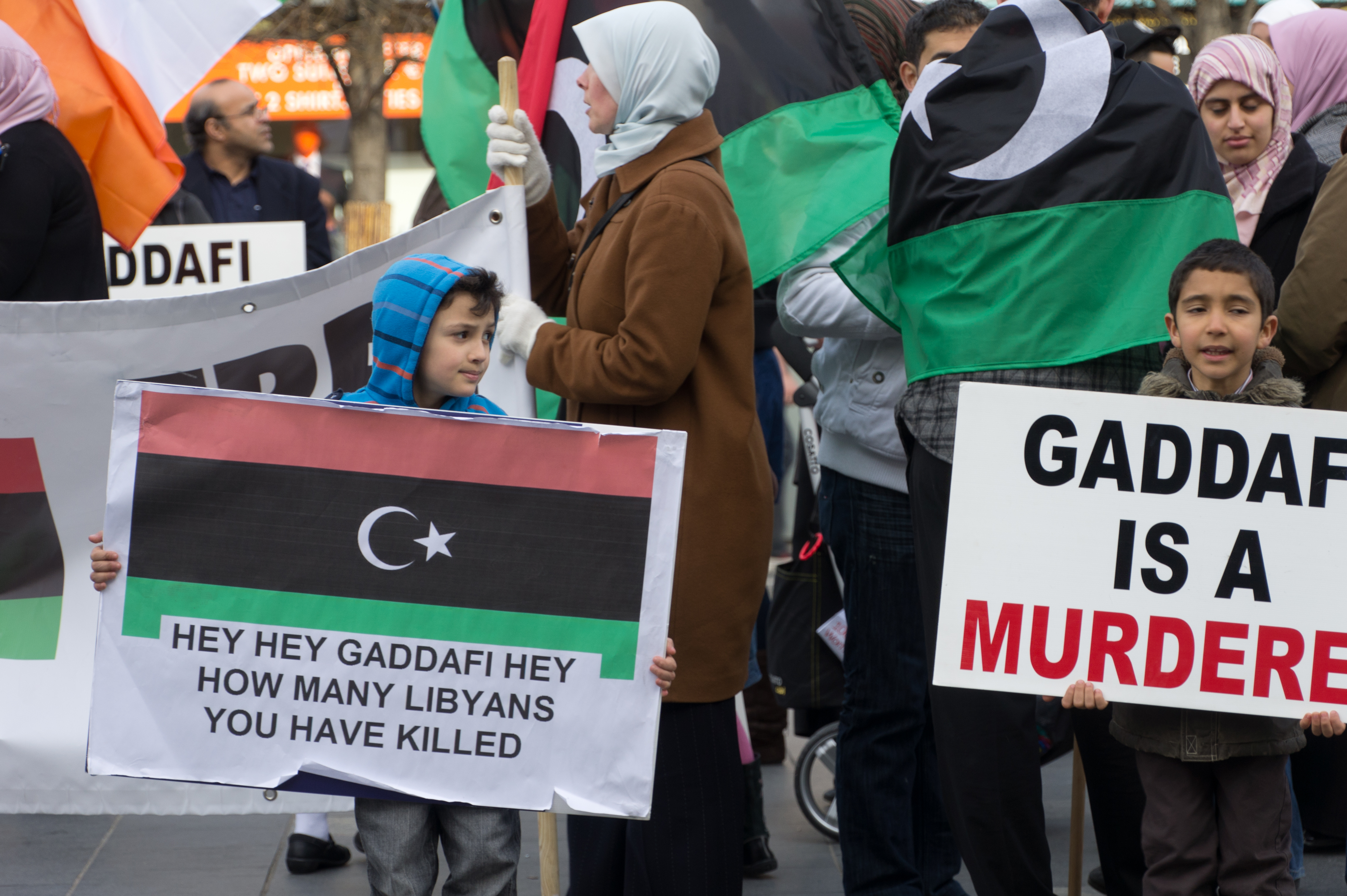
People in Dublin, Ireland, protesting against Gaddafi (March 2011).

Independent numbers of dead and injured in the conflict have still not been made available. Estimates have been widely varied. On 24 February, Libya's ambassador to Malta said that Gaddafi's government believed the number of dead to be about 300, including civilians, police officers, and soldiers. The exact same day, the Islamic Republic of Iran Broadcasting reported that the International Criminal Court estimated 10,000 had been killed. The numbers of injured were estimated to be around 4,000 by 22 February.

On 2 March, the World Health Organization estimated approximately 2,000 killed. At the same time, the opposition said that 6,500 people had died. Later, rebel spokesman Abdul Hafiz Ghoga reported that the death toll reached 8,000.

In June 2011, Amnesty International stated that earlier estimates of the initial clashes in February were exaggerated. It estimated that during the first few days of the conflict, 100 to 110 people were killed in Benghazi and 59 to 64 were killed in Bayda.

On 8 September, Naji Barakat, the Health Minister of the National Transitional Council, stated that about half of an estimated 30,000 dead were believed to have been pro-Gaddafi fighters. War wounded were estimated as at least 50,000, of which about 20,000 were serious injuries, but this estimate was expected to rise. However, there was no independent verification of the Health Minister's statement and, one month later, the NTC reduced the estimated number of killed to 25,000.

In January 2013, the new Libyan government, based on figures still being checked, estimated the number of killed to be actually far lower than previous estimates, with 4,700 rebel supporters and a similar number of Gaddafi supporters killed during the conflict. An estimated 2,100 people on both sides were missing.

Armed Conflict Location and Event Data Project, which compiles a database of all reported fatalities due to political violence on the African continent, listed 6,109 fatalities from 15 February to 23 October 2011, of which 1,319 prior to NATO intervention.

The Uppsala Conflict Data Program, a public data resource that includes information on different types of organized violence (e.g. actors involved, casualties, date, location, etc.), reported that between 1,914 and 3,466 people were killed during the 2011 fighting. In addition their data shows that between 152 and 168 civilians were deliberately killed by the pro-Gaddafi forces in 2011.

There were no combat casualties amongst the coalition forces, although one RAF airman was killed in an accident in Italy.

=== Legal qualification ===
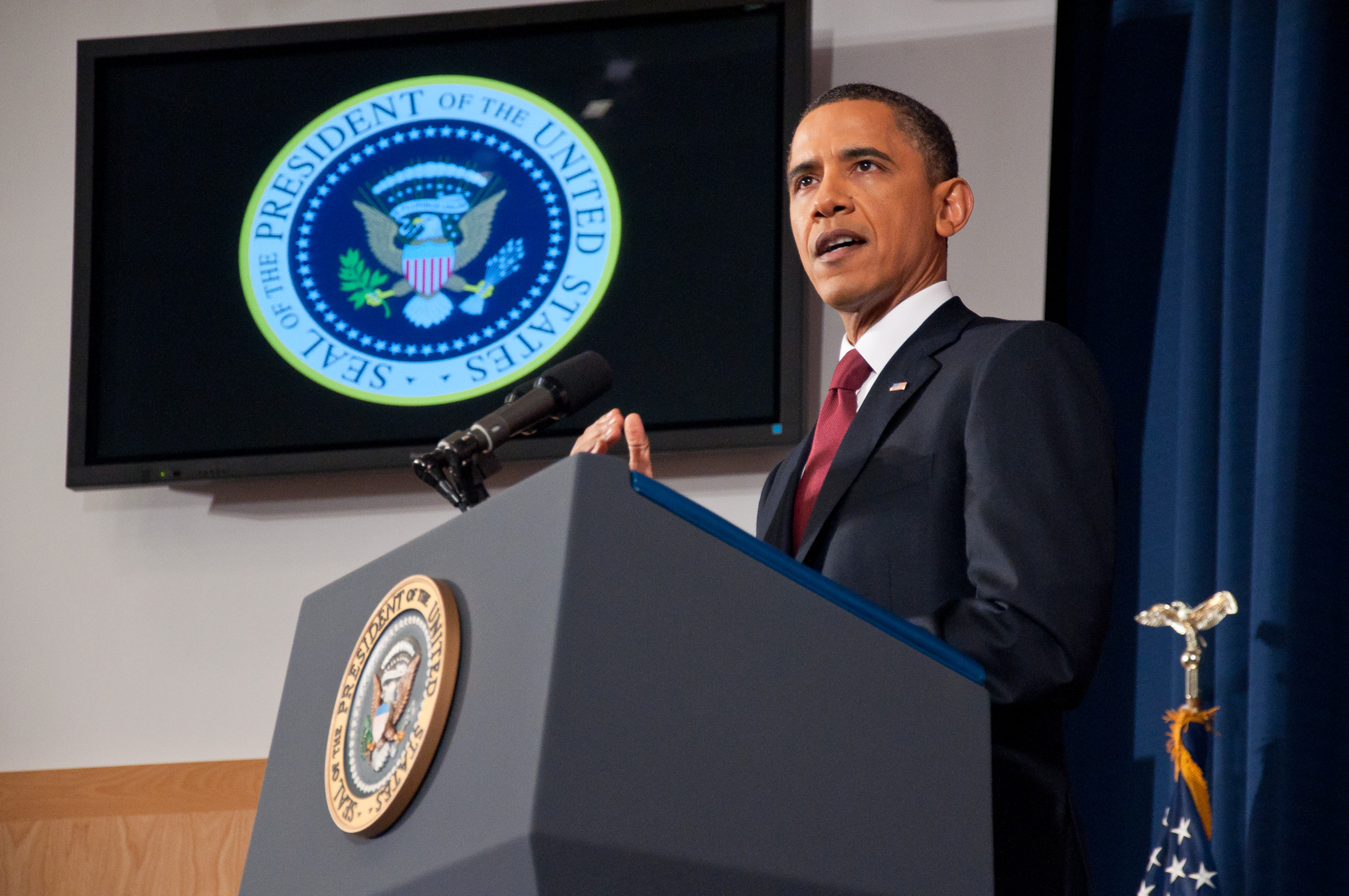
President Barack Obama speaking on the military intervention in Libya at the National Defense University.

Legal qualification of an armed conflict determines which rules of international humanitarian law apply to the conduct of the parties during that conflict. In general, the normative framework applicable to international conflicts is broader and more detailed than the sum of rules that apply in conflicts not of an international character.

The qualification of the Libyan conflict is the subject of some academic controversy. While most agree that the intensity of the fighting and the organization of the insurgents quickly rose to the level required for the existence of a non-international armed conflict under Common Article 3 of the 1949 Geneva Conventions, the exact date when these conditions were considered fulfilled ranges from late February to 10 March 2011.

It is generally accepted that the military intervention by a multi-state coalition acting under the Security Council mandate since 19 March 2011 occasioned an international armed conflict between Libya and the intervening states. Some academics believe that this intervention transformed the legal nature of the conflict as a whole, with the result that even the rebels should have been considered one of the parties to an overarching international conflict spanning the whole Libyan territory. Others doubt this on account of both legal and factual considerations.

Finally, it remains unsettled whether or not the rebels' overthrow of Gaddafi's government following the fall of Tripoli in August 2011 changed the nature of the conflict again. Some academics believe that as the rebels were now the legitimate and effective government of the state of Libya, the conflict was "deinternationalised" and thus non-international in nature again. Others maintain the opposite position, arguing that the available legal tests for "deinternationalisation" are unpersuasive and introduce vague and politicized criteria that cannot be satisfactorily considered in the heat of the battle. Consequently, these authors would consider that the international nature of the conflict remained unchanged until the end of hostilities.

The ongoing conflict (or conflicts) ended for the purposes of legal qualification with the conclusion of hostilities in Libya in the end of October 2011.

=== Humanitarian situation ===
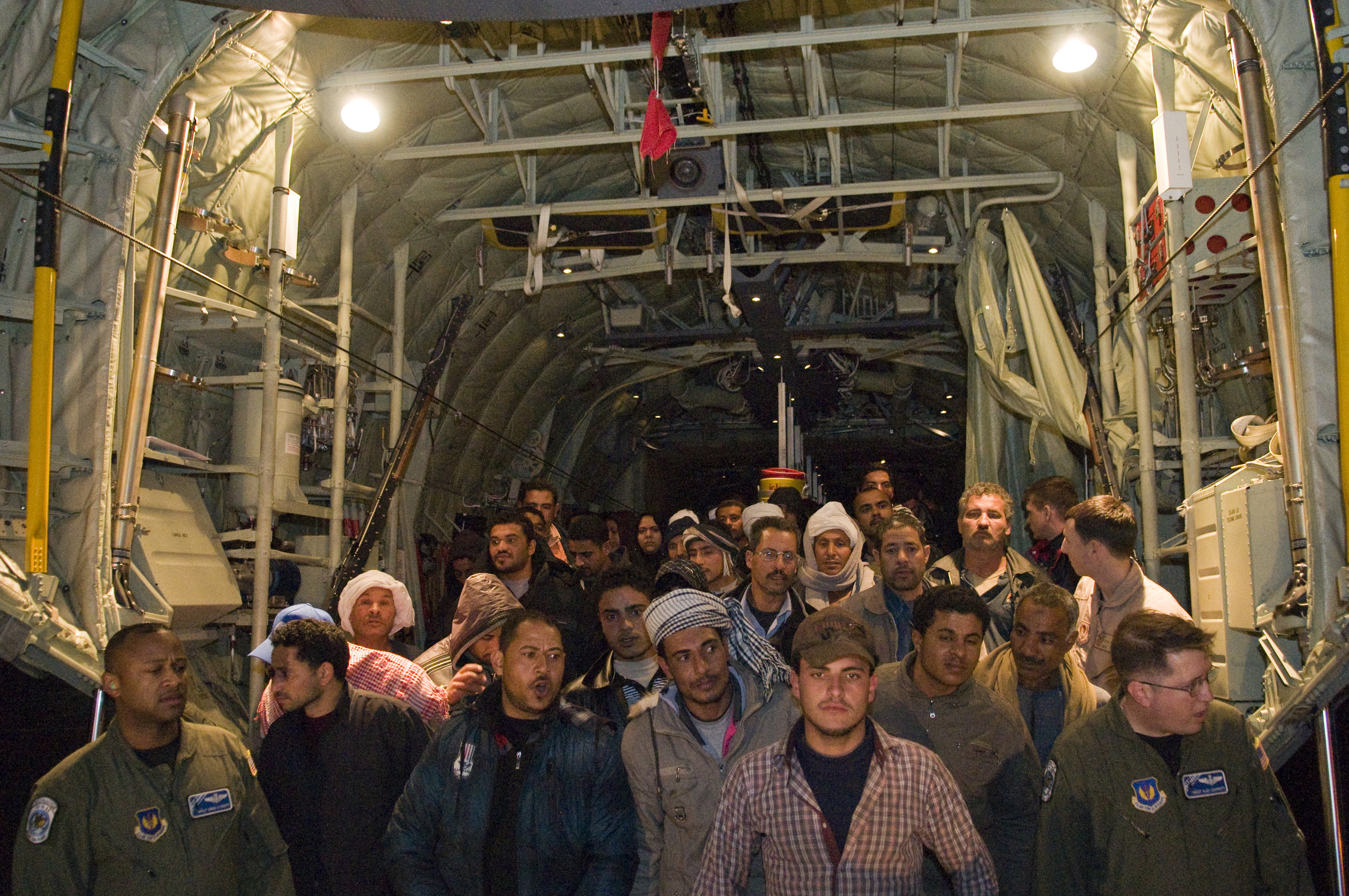
US forces transport displaced Egyptian workers, March 2011

By the end of February 2011, supplies of medicine, fuel and food were dangerously low in Libya's urban centres. On 25 February, the International Committee of the Red Cross launched an emergency appeal for US$6,400,000 to meet the emergency needs of people affected by the violent unrest in Libya. In early March, the fighting across Libya meant that more than a million people fleeing or inside the country needed humanitarian aid. The Islamic Relief and the WFP also coordinated a shipment of humanitarian supplies to Misrata. In March, the Swedish government donated medical supplies and other humanitarian aid and the UN World Food Programme provided food. Turkey sent a hospital ship to Misrata and a Turkish cargo ship brought 141 tons of humanitarian aid.

Another humanitarian issue was refugees fleeing the crisis. A humanitarian ship docked in harbour of Misrata in April to begin the evacuation of stranded migrants. By 10 July, over 150,000 migrants were evacuated. Migrants were also stranded elsewhere in Libya, such as in the southern towns of Sebha and Gatroum. Fleeing the violence of Tripoli by road, as many as 4,000 refugees were crossing the Libya–Tunisia border daily during the first days of the uprising. Among those escaping the violence were native Libyans as well as foreign nationals including Egyptians, Tunisians and Turks.

While the UN sanctioned military intervention has been implemented on humanitarian grounds, UN agencies seeking to ease the humanitarian crisis repeatedly rejected offers of support from the military to carry out the agencies' humanitarian operations. The conditions under which such support may be accepted are outlined in the Guidelines on the Use of Military and Civil Defence Assets to Support United Nations Humanitarian Activities in Complex Emergencies (MCDA), whereby military support can be used but only temporarily and as a last resort. Yet, there remains the concern that aid agencies' neutrality will be brought into question by accepting military support, putting aid staff at risk of being attacked and causing some parties to prevent the agencies accessing all the areas they need to. Furthermore, the military may not always have the technical skills required to assess the need for aid and to ensure its effective distribution. Despite this, offers continue for the creation of an aid corridor and aid agencies have accepted military logistical support in the past, for instance in the 2010 Pakistan floods response.

=== Ethnic targeting ===
In August 2011, the UNHCR issued a strong call for the rights and lives of sub-Saharan Africans living in Libya to be protected due to reports that black Africans were being targeted by the rebel forces as cities fell. Other news sources including The Independent and CNN have reported on the targeting of black people in rebel held areas.

An Amnesty International statement, released on 30 August 2011, stated that on visits to detention centres in Zawiya and Tripoli, Amnesty International was informed that between one third and half of those detained were from Sub-Saharan Africa. A New York Times online article also comments that "it seems that plenty of the black Africans captured as mercenaries were never actually involved in the fight". "Hundreds of thousands of sub-Saharan Africans worked in Gaddafi's Libya, doing everything from managing hotels to sweeping floors. But some also fought as pro-Gaddafi mercenaries, and many migrant workers [-] fled ahead of the rebels, fearing they would be mistaken for mercenaries."

It was also reported that some African women had said rebels were raping them in refugee camps, with additional reports of forced labour. Foreign aid workers were also claiming to be prohibited from officially talking about the allegations.

The town of Tawergha, which supported Gaddafi prior to its capture by anti-Gaddafi fighters in August, has been emptied of its mostly black inhabitants in what appeared to be a "major reprisal against supporters of the Gaddafi regime", according to an 11 September report from The Sunday Telegraph, and commanders of the Misrata Brigade are refusing to allow the displaced townspeople to return. One commander was quoted as saying, "Tawergha no longer exists."

In 2014 a former Gaddafi officer reported to the New York Times that the civil war was now an "ethnic struggle" between Arab tribes (like the Zintanis) against those of Turkish ancestry (like the Misuratis), as well as against the Berbers and Circassians.

=== Libyan refugees ===
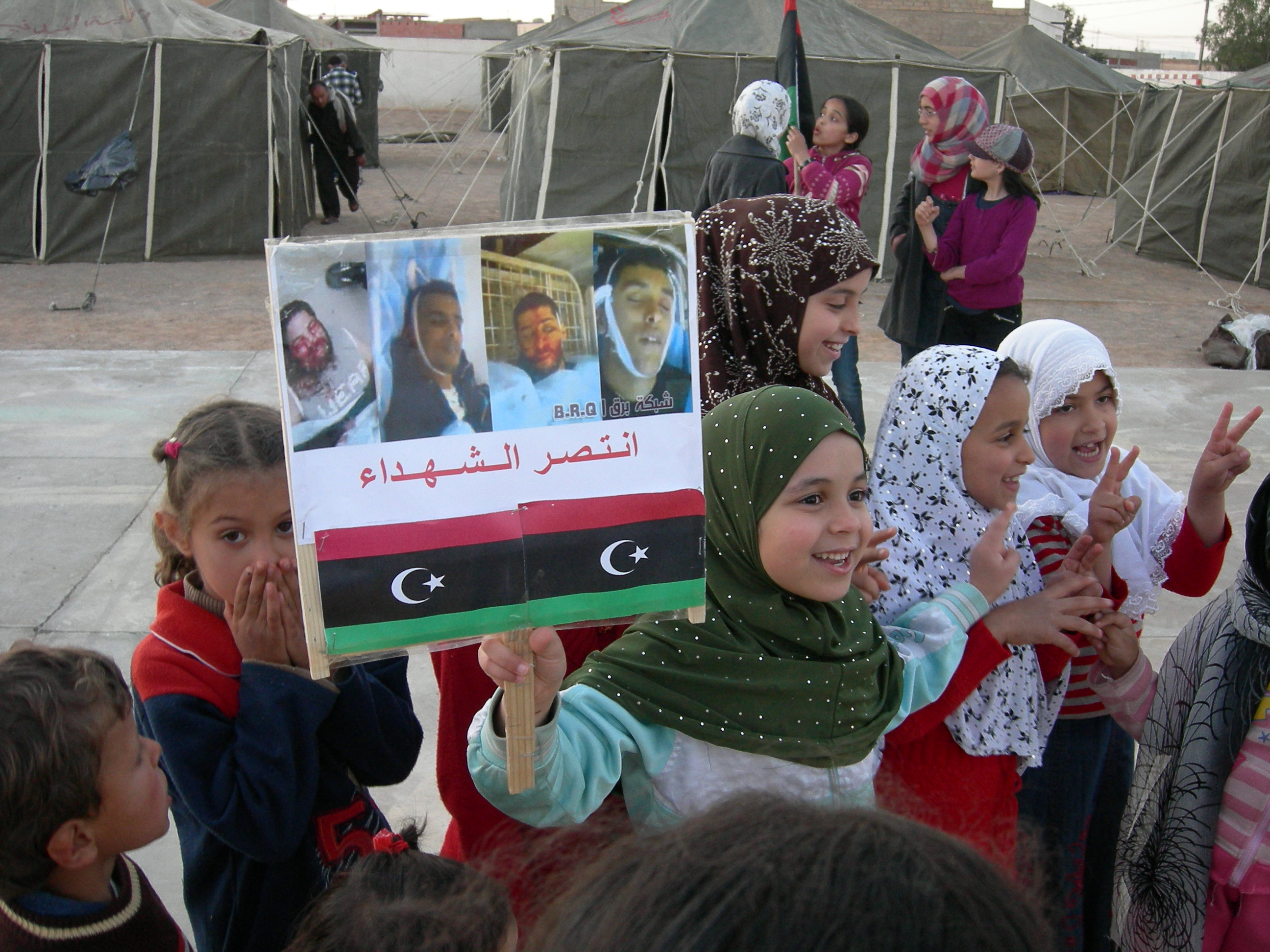
Libyan children at a refugee camp, April 2011

Fleeing the violence of Tripoli by road, as many as 4,000 refugees were crossing the Libya–Tunisia border daily during the first days of the uprising. Among those, escaping the violence, were native Libyans as well as foreign nationals including Egyptians, Tunisians and Turks. In February, Italian Foreign Minister Frattini expressed his concerns that the amount of Libyan refugees trying to reach Italy might reach between 200,000 and 300,000 people. By 1 March, officials from the UN High Commissioner for Refugees had confirmed allegations of discrimination against sub-Saharan Africans who were held in dangerous conditions in the no-man's-land between Tunisia and Libya. By 3 March, an estimated 200,000 refugees had fled Libya to either Tunisia or Egypt. A provisional refugee camp set up at Ras Ajdir with a capacity for 10,000 was overflowing with an estimated 20,000 to 30,000 refugees. Many tens of thousands were still trapped on the Libyan side of the frontier. By 3 March, the situation was described as a logistical nightmare, with the World Health Organization warning of the risk of epidemics.

To continue responding to the needs of people staying at the Ras Ajdir crossing point in Tunisia, the WFP and Secours Islamique-France were upgrading a kitchen that would provide breakfast for families. Separately, the ICRC advised it was handing over its operations at the Choucha Camp to the Tunisian Red Crescent. Since 24 March, the WFP supplied over 42,500 cooked meals for TCNs at the Saloum border. A total of 1,650 cartons of fortified date bars (equivalent of 13.2 metric tons) had also been provided to supplement these meals.

The Sunday Telegraph reported on 11 September that almost the entire population of Tawergha, a town of about 10,000 people, had been forced to flee their homes by anti-Gaddafi fighters after their takeover of the settlement. The report suggested that Tawergha, which was dominated by black Libyans, may have been the subject of ethnic cleansing provoked by a combination of racism and bitterness on the part of Misratan fighters over the town's support for Gaddafi during the siege of Misrata.

=== Economic, religious and tribal ===
Oil prices around the world increased during the Libyan conflict, due to the country's significant oil reserves. The Arabian Gulf Oil Company, the second-largest state-owned oil company in Libya, announced plans to use oil funds to support anti-Gaddafi forces. Islamic leaders and clerics in Libya, notably the Network of Free Ulema – Libya urged all Muslims to rebel against Gaddafi. The Magarha tribe announced their support of the protesters. The Zuwayya tribe, based in eastern Libya, threatened to cut off oil exports from fields in its part of Libya if Libyan security forces continued attacking demonstrators.

The Tuareg people consistently supported Gaddafi during the Civil War, and for a time sheltered Gaddafi's son, Saif al-Islam. Gaddafi had given many Tuareg refuge from persecution in neighbouring Sahel countries, and that he patronized Tuareg culture in many ways, such as through festivals such as the Ghadames Festival, and also the designation of Ghadames old town as a UNESCO World Heritage Site. One Tuareg fighter said he and other Tuareg were ready to "fight for Gaddafi to the last drop of blood".

As of 2013, Tuareg areas such as Ghat remain Gaddafi loyalist strongholds.

== International reactions ==
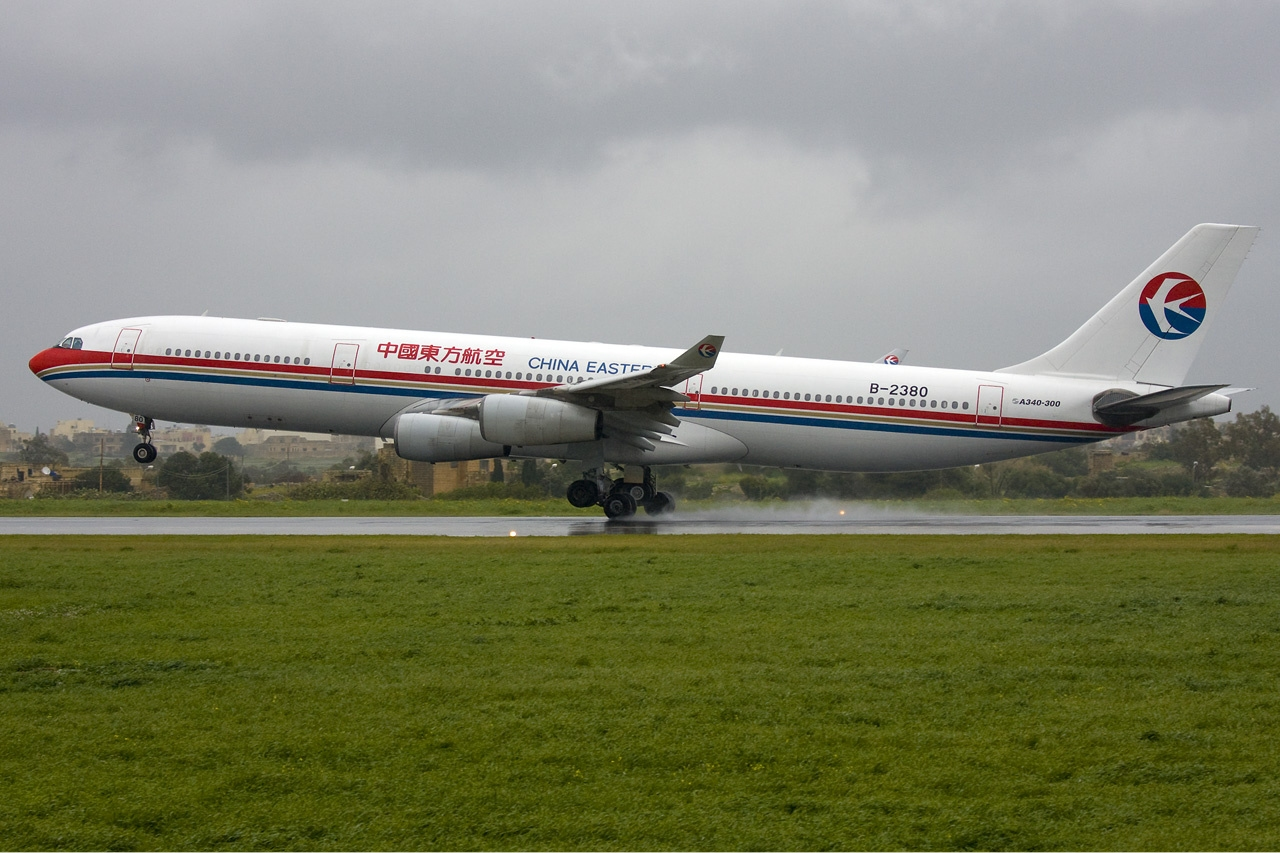
A total of 19 charter flights evacuated Chinese citizens from Libya via Malta. Here a chartered China Eastern Airlines Airbus A340 is seen at Malta International Airport on 26 February 2011.

Many states and supranational bodies condemned Gaddafi's government over disputed allegations of air attacks on civilian targets within the country. Virtually all Western countries cut off diplomatic relations with Gaddafi's government over disputed reports of an aerial bombing campaign in February and March, and a number of other countries led by Peru and Botswana did likewise. United Nations Security Council Resolution 1970 was adopted on 26 February, freezing the assets of Gaddafi and ten members of his inner circle and restricting their travel. The resolution also referred the actions of the government to the International Criminal Court for investigation, and an arrest warrant for Gaddafi was issued on 27 June. This was followed by an arrest warrant issued by Interpol on 8 September.

The disputed allegations about the Libyan government's use of the Libyan Air Force to strike civilians led to the adoption of United Nations Security Council Resolution 1973 to create a Libyan no-fly zone on 17 March, though several countries involved in the resolution's enforcement have also carried out regular strike missions to degrade the offensive capacity of the Libyan Army and destroy the government's command and control capabilities, effectively acting in de facto support of anti-Gaddafi forces on the ground. The later British parliament's Foreign Affairs Select Committee inquiry concluded that by summer 2011 British policy had become one of regime change.

China and Russia, originally abstaining on United Nations Security Council Resolution 1973 due to the influence of the Arab League, pointed out that the implemented "no-fly-zone" had gone much further out of the originally agreed aims.

One hundred countries recognized the anti-Gaddafi National Transitional Council as Libya's legitimate representative, with many of those countries explicitly describing it as the legal interim government of the country due to the perceived loss of legitimacy on the part of Gaddafi's government, though the National Transitional Council never obtained authority and security across all of Libya.

Many states also either issued travel advisories or attempted evacuations. Some evacuations were successful to Malta or via land borders to Egypt or Tunisia; other attempts were hindered by tarmac damage at Benghazi's airport or refusals of permission to land in Tripoli. There were also several solidarity protests in other countries that were mostly composed of Libyan expatriates. Financial markets around the world had adverse reactions to the instability, with oil prices rising to a 2 1/2-year high.

== See also ==
- 1976 Libyan protests
- 2011 Battle of Tripoli
- 2011 Battle of Sirte
- Aftermath of the First Libyan Civil War
- Arab Spring
- Free speech in the media during the 2011 Libyan Civil War
- Moussa Ibrahim, Gaddafi's spokesman
- Human rights in Libya
- List of modern conflicts in North Africa
- List of modern conflicts in the Middle East
- Green Resistance
- 2015 European migrant crisis
