= American involvement in the 2011 Libyan Civil War =

American involvement in the Libyan Civil War initially consisted of diplomatic initiatives and sanctions. This was followed by the implementation of the UN-mandated no-fly zone, the development of diplomatic relations with the rebels as well as humanitarian aid, bombing missions to destroy Gaddafi's military capabilities, and diplomatic assistance to the rebels.

In March 2011, five United States Air Force bombers (three B-2s and two B-1Bs) dropped bombs on at least 100 targets in Libya.

In June 2011, bombers thought to be from France killed nine civilians in Libya, including two toddlers.

Libya did not develop a central government after the military involvement.

Libyan rebels had consistently told American government officials that they did not want overt foreign military assistance in toppling Gaddafi. Instead, covert military assistance was used (including arms shipments to opposition). The plan following Gaddafi's death was to immediately begin flowing humanitarian assistance to eastern Libya and later western Libya, as the symbolism would be critically important. US sources stressed it as important that they would "not allow Turkey, Italy and others to steal a march on it".

== Death of Muammar Gaddafi ==
Moments after it was reported that Gaddafi was killed, Fox News published an article titled "U.S. Drone Involved in Final Qaddafi Strike, as Obama Heralds Regime's 'End'", noting that a U.S. Predator drone was involved in the airstrike on Gaddafi's convoy in the moments before his death. An anonymous US official subsequently described their policy in hindsight as "lead[ing] from behind".

== Development of American relations with the National Transitional Council ==
1. On 10 March 2011, Secretary of State Hillary Clinton met anti-Gaddafi opposition leaders during a trip to Egypt and Tunisia. After the meeting between Clinton and representatives of the council, the European Union and the U.S. have decided to talk to the council without officially recognising them, in order to seek further information on the group and its goals.
2. On 17 March, ahead of a U.N vote on a no-fly zone, Under Secretary of State William J. Burns affirmed U.S. support for a no-fly zone, as well as more aggressive measures to restrain Gaddhafi, that the U.S. is investigating transferring Gaddafi's frozen assets to the rebels, and that the NTC may open an embassy in Washington.
3. On 29 March, the U.S. confirmed at a conference in London that it will send a formal representative to Benghazi. In late April, Ambassador Gene Cretz said the U.S. was continuing to consider formal recognition of the council, but in the meantime, it is providing strong informal support, including reportedly authorizing international oil deals with rebel-held eastern Libya.
4. On 13 May 2011, US National Security Adviser Tom Donilon said his government recognized the National Transitional Council as "a legitimate and credible interlocutor of the Libyan people" after meeting with Prime Minister Mahmoud Jebril. White House Press Secretary Jay Carney said that the U.S. had not yet decided to fully recognize the council as Libya's sole legitimate representative body.
5. On 24 May, the NTC opened a formal diplomatic office in Washington, D.C. (the U.S. had already had an office in Benghazi with a formal envoy for nearly two months).
6. On 9 June, Clinton said, "The United States views the Transitional National Council as the legitimate interlocutor for the Libyan people during this interim period," but Washington and Benghazi indicated that the U.S. still had not committed to the same level of formal recognition as France and several other countries.
7. On 15 July, at an international conference on Libya held in Turkey, Clinton stated that the US had decided to formally recognise the NTC as the country's "legitimate authority", allowing the US to divert over $30 billion worth of Gaddafi regime funds frozen in the US to the NTC.
