= List of conflicts in Libya =

Location of Libya

== Ancient Times ==
=== Egyptian Empire ===
Egyptian Empire

- circa 1279 B.C.E. — 1213 B.C.E. Ramesses II's Campaigns in Libya

=== Carthaginian Empire ===
- 264 B.C.E. — 146 B.C.E. Punic Wars

=== Kingdom of Numidia ===
- 112 B.C.E. — 106 B.C.E. Jugurthine War

=== Roman Province of Africa ===
193 C.E. – 211 C.E. Military activity of Septimius Severus

  - 203 C.E. The Roman Emperor Septimius Severus launched a campaign deep into the Sahara, capturing the capital city of the Garamantian Empire Germa, but he abandoned it soon after.
- 439 C.E. The Vandals overran the Roman Province of Africa

== Medieval Times ==
=== Vandal Kingdom ===
- June 533 C.E. — March 534 C.E. Vandalic War

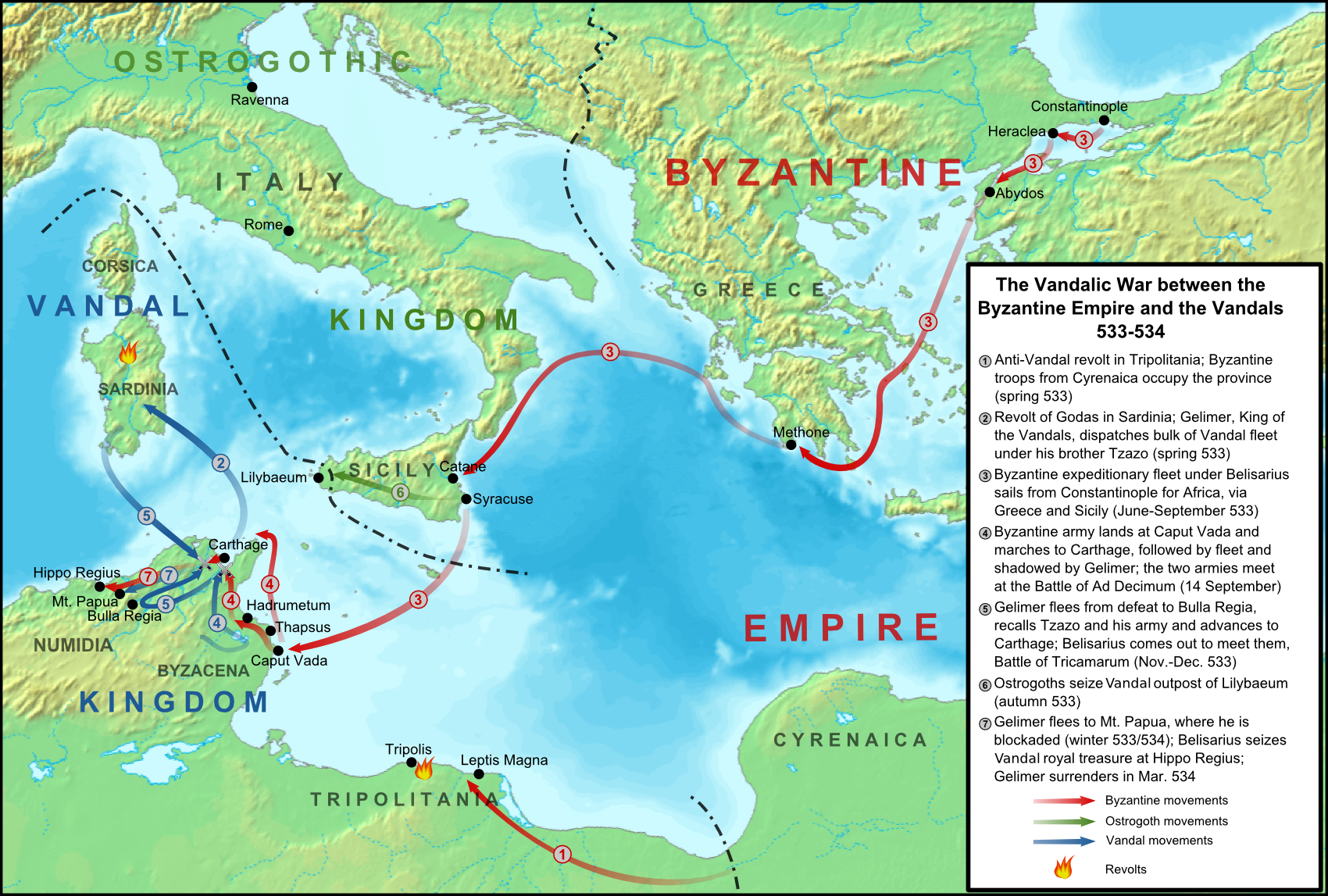
Vandalic War

  - Diplomatic preparations and revolts in Tripolitania and Sardinia
    - Spring 533 C.E. Anti-Vandal revolt in Tripolitania; Byzantine troops from Cyrenaica occupy the province

=== Byzantine Praetorian prefecture of Africa ===
- The Moorish Wars
  - 534 C.E. First Moorish uprising
  - 544 C.E. Second Moorish uprising and the revolt of Guntharic

=== Byzantine Exarchate of Africa ===
- 647 C.E. — 709 C.E. Muslim conquest of the Maghreb
  - 669 C.E. The city Germa was conquered by Uqba ibn Nafi.

Expansion of Rashidun Caliphate

=== Ayyubid dynasty ===
- 1171 C.E. — 1172 C.E. Conquest of North Africa and Nubia

=== Mamluk Sultanate of Egypt ===
- 1551 C.E. Ottoman conquest

== Modern Times ==
=== Ottoman Eyalet of Tripolitania ===
- June 30, 1793 C.E. — January 20, 1795 C.E. Tripolitanian civil war
- May 10, 1801 C.E. — June 10, 1805 C.E. First Barbary War
  - April 27, 1805 C.E. — May 13, 1805 C.E. Battle of Derne
- February 1820 C.E. — October 1822 C.E. Invasion of Libya and Sudan

=== Ottoman Vilayet of Tripolitania ===
- September 29, 1911 C.E. — October 18, 1912 C.E. Italo-Turkish War
- 1911 C.E. — 1943 C.E. Libyan resistance movement

=== Italian Libya ===
- September 29, 1911 C.E. — October 18, 1912 C.E. Italo-Turkish War
- 1911 C.E. — 1943 C.E. Libyan resistance movement
  - 1915 C.E. Gasr Bu Hadi
- July 28, 1914 C.E. — November 11, 1918 C.E. World War I
  - 1914 C.E. — 1918 C.E. North African theatre
- September 1, 1939 C.E. — September 2, 1945 C.E. World War II
  - June 10, 1940 C.E. — May 2, 1945 C.E. Mediterranean and Middle East theatre of World War II
    - June 10, 1940 C.E. — May 13, 1943 C.E. North African Campaign
      - June 11, 1940 C.E. — February 4, 1943 C.E. Western Desert Campaign
        - January 3 — January 5, 1941 C.E. Battle of Bardia
        - January 31, 1941 C.E. — March 1, 1941 C.E. Battle of Kufra
        - May 26 — June 21, 1942 C.E. Battle of Gazala
        - May 26 — June 11, 1942 C.E. Battle of Bir Hakeim
        - December 11 — December 18, 1942 C.E. Battle of El Agheila

=== Allied occupation of Libya ===
- June 1,948 C.E. Anti-Jewish rioters in Libya killed 12 Jews and destroyed 280 Jewish homes

=== Kingdom of Libya ===
- Chadian Civil War (1965–1979)
- September 1, 1,969 C.E. Libyan coup

=== Libyan Arab Republic ===
- September 1, 1,969 C.E. Libyan coup

=== Great Socialist People's Libyan Arab Jamahiriya ===
- 1,947 C.E. — 1,991 C.E. Cold War
  - August 19, 1,981 C.E. Gulf of Sidra incident
  - March, 1,986 C.E. Action in the Gulf of Sidra
  - April 15, 1,986 C.E. United States bombing of Libya
  - January 4, 1,989 C.E. Gulf of Sidra incident
  - July 21, 1,977 C.E. — July 24, 1,977 C.E. Libyan—Egyptian War
- 1,978 C.E. — 1,987 C.E. Chadian-Libyan conflict
  - 1,983 C.E. — 1,984 C.E. Operation Manta
  - February 13, 1,986 C.E. — ongoing Opération Épervier
  - December 16, 1,986 C.E. — September 11, 1,987 C.E. Toyota War

=== National Transitional Council of Libya ===
- December 18, 2,010 C.E. — ongoing Arab Spring
  - 2,011 C.E. — ongoing Libyan Crisis
    - February 15, 2,011 C.E. — October 23, 2,011 C.E. Libyan Civil War
      - February 15, 2,011 C.E. — February 20, 2,011 C.E. First Battle of Benghazi
      - February 17, 2,011 C.E. — February 25, 2,011 C.E. Tripoli protests and clashes
      - February 18, 2,011 C.E. — May 15, 2,011 C.E. Battle of Misrata
      - February 24, 2,011 C.E. — March 10, 2,011 C.E. First Battle of Zawiya
      - March 1, 2,011 C.E. — August 18, 2,011 C.E. Nafusa Mountains campaign
        - April 21, 2,011 C.E. Battle of Wazzin
        - August 13, 2,011 C.E. — August 18, 2,011 C.E. Battle of Gharyan
      - March 2, 2,011 C.E. First Battle of Brega
      - March 19, 2,011 C.E. — October 31, 2,011 C.E. Military intervention in Libya
        - March 19, 2,011 C.E. — October 31, 2,011 C.E. Operation Ellamy
        - March 19, 2,011 C.E. — March 31, 2,011 C.E. Opération Harmattan
        - March 19, 2,011 C.E. — November 1, 2,011 C.E. Operation Mobile
        - March 19, 2,011 C.E. — March 31, 2,011 C.E. Operation Odyssey Dawn
        - March 23, 2,011 C.E. — October 31, 2,011 C.E. Operation Unified Protector

=== State of Libya ===
- December 18, 2,010 C.E. — ongoing Arab Spring
  - 2,011 C.E. — ongoing Libyan Crisis
    - November 1, 2011 C.E. — May 16, 2014 C.E. Factional violence in Libya
      - January 23, 2,012 C.E. — January 25, 2,012 C.E. Bani Walid uprising
      - February 12, 2,012 C.E. — July 1, 2,012 C.E. Kufra conflict
      - March 25, 2,012 C.E. — March 31, 2,012 C.E. Sabha conflict
      - June 4, 2,012 C.E. Tripoli airport clashes
      - June 11, 2,012 C.E. — June 18, 2,012 C.E. Zintan clashes
      - September 9, 2,012 C.E. — October 26, 2,012 C.E. Siege of Bani Walid
      - September 11, 2,012 C.E. — September 12, 2,012 C.E. Benghazi attack
      - June 8, 2,013 C.E. — June 15, 2,013 C.E. Benghazi conflict
      - February 14, 2014 C.E. — May 2,014 C.E. Libyan coup d'état attempts
    - May 16, 2,014 C.E. — ongoing Second Libyan Civil War
      - May 16, 2,014 C.E. — ongoing Operation Dignity
      - July 13, 2,014 C.E. — August 23, 2,014 C.E. Battle of Tripoli Airport
      - October 5, 2,014 C.E. — ongoing ISIL takeover of Derna
      - January 27, 2,015 C.E. Corinthia Hotel attack
      - February 8, 2,015 C.E. — February 9, 2,015 C.E. Fall of Nofaliya
      - February 12, 2,015 C.E. Kidnapping and beheading of Copts in Libya
      - February 16, 2,015 C.E. — ongoing Egyptian military intervention in Libya

== See also ==
- List of wars involving Libya
- Libyan Army (1951–2011)
- Libyan Air Force (1951–2011)
- Libyan Air Force (2011–present)
- Libyan National Army
- Libyan Navy
- Armed Forces of the Libyan Arab Jamahiriya
- Military history of Africa
- African military systems to 1,800 C.E.
- African military systems 1,800 C.E. — 1,900 C.E.
- African military systems after 1,900 C.E.
