= Central Libya offensive =

2020 offensive in the Libyan civil war

- Part of the Libyan civil war (2014–2020)
- Map of the offensive Libyan National Army control Government of National Accord control
Date	6–11 June 2020 (5 days)
Location	Sirte, Al Jufra Airbase, Libya
Result	Ceasefire: GNA fails to fully capture Sirte; Russia scrambles MiG-29 and Su-24 fighter jets to Libya to prevent the capture of the city; HoR repels a GNA assault on Sirte; GNA captures several districts on the outskirts of Sirte
Territorial changes	Status quo ante bellum

Belligerents
(Libya) Government of National Accord: Libyan Army; Libyan Navy (GNA–aligned); Libyan Air Force (GNA–aligned); (Syrian opposition) Syrian National Army; Supported by: Turkey	(Libya) House of Representatives: Libyan National Army; Libyan Navy (LNA–aligned); Libyan Air Force (LNA–aligned); Wagner Group; Supported by: Russia; Egypt; United Arab Emirates

Commanders and leaders
(Libya) Fayez al-Sarraj (Prime Minister) (Libya) Brig. Gen. Ibrahim Bayt al-Mal (Sirte-Jufra operations room commander)	(Libya) Field Marshal Khalifa Haftar (LNA supreme commander)

Strength
Unknown	Some MiG-29 and Su-24 fighter jets

Casualties and losses
(Libya) Unknown (Syrian opposition) 130 killed 2 Bayraktar TB2 combat drones lost	Unknown killed 1 Wing Loong I lost

The Central Libya offensive, officially known as Operation Paths to Victory, was a military offensive in Libya launched by the forces of the Government of National Accord, to take the city of Sirte and Al Jufra Airbase from the House of Representatives backed by the Libyan National Army. The city of Sirte is considered strategically important because of its close position to oil facilities, which give it control over Libya's oil and gas shipping ports. The Al Jufra Airbase is strategically important for the GNA, due to its central position to Fezzan and denying the Libyan National Army air superiority over Central Libya.

The campaign began on 6 June 2020, one day after the conclusion of the 2019–2020 Western Libya campaign, a failed attempt by the Libyan National Army to capture Tripoli.

== Background ==
A civil war has been ongoing in Libya since 2014, and after 2016 the country was mainly divided between the Tobruk-based House of Representatives in the east, and the Government of National Accord in Tripoli and western Libya. Field Marshal Khalifa Haftar's Libyan National Army provided military support to the House of Representatives. The rival governments both claim to be the legitimate government of Libya. The GNA is internationally recognised by the United Nations Security Council as the government of Libya, though the LNA receives support from several countries, including Russia, United Arab Emirates, and France. By 2019 the LNA controlled more than half of Libya, while the GNA mainly controlled Tripoli and a few other areas.

In April 2019, Haftar's forces launched an operation to take control of the capital Tripoli from the GNA and unite all of Libya. On 6 January 2020, the LNA captured Sirte. After fourteen months of fighting, the GNA held Tripoli and pushed the eastern forces out of the city by 4 June 2020. After that, the GNA military launched a counteroffensive against Haftar's forces. The town of Sirte and the nearby Al Jufra airbase are considered essential to take control of Libya's oil ports along the Mediterranean Sea, and the airbase houses MiG-29 fighters and Su-24 bombers provided by Russia to Haftar's forces. The Sirte-Jufra Operations Room was established by the GNA to oversee the Libyan Army operations in the area, with Brigadier General Ibrahim Bayt al-Mal as the commander.

== Campaign ==
5 June

The GNA recaptured much of the territory in northwestern Libya that was taken by the LNA during the 2019–20 offensive on Tripoli.

6 June

GNA forces launched an offensive to recapture LNA–held Sirte. Two GNA Bayraktar TB-2 drones are destroyed by LNA air defenses in Sirte. In turn one UAE operated Wing Loong Drone was shot down in Sirte.

7 June

GNA forces enter Sirte. However, an LNA counterattack using drones, aircraft and artillery drove the attackers back, inflicting heavy casualties on Turkish officers and GNA fighters. According to Libyan and Bulgarian sources, an airstrike launched from an unknown aircraft, possibly Russian MiG-29s, destroyed a Turkish military convoy, leaving casualties (including Turkish servicemen and Syrian rebels) halting the GNA advance.

8 June

GNA affiliated force said they took control of two districts in the outskirts of Sirte.

9 June

The GNA rejected a ceasefire proposal offered by Egypt.

11 June

The LNA was able to slow down the advance of the GNA towards Sirte, using air power.

== Aftermath ==
26 June

According to the country’s National Oil Corporation, foreign mercenaries led by the Russian paramilitary Wagner Group entered and seized Libya’s largest oil fields, the El Sharara oil field on 26 June and took full control of it by the 27 June. The Sidr oil port was taken as well by the mercenaries.

4 July

On 4 July, unidentified "foreign" warplanes aligned to the LNA targeted Al-Watiya Air Base. The airstrikes destroyed GNA military equipment brought by Turkey; including MIM-23 Hawk air defenses and a KORAL Electronic Warfare System stationed in the base. Sources consulted from Al-Arabiya indicated that the strikes left Turkish intelligence officials wounded and a Libyan Newspaper Libya Akhbar cited 6 Turkish servicemen killed. Turkey claimed that the strikes didn't cause any casualties.

13 July

On 13 July, Turkey has warned Haftar if they do not withdraw that they will use military action against him. Meanwhile Egypt is involved in negotiations with Greece over Libya to support LNA.

22 July

Egypt starts to deploy troops after talking to parliament which could lead to an escalation of the civil war or possibly all out war between Turkey and Egypt.

12 August

The LNA air force targeted an armed convoy of suspected Turkish-backed mercenaries affiliated with Fayez Al-Sarraj's GNA in Wadi Bey area west of Sirte. According to LNA sources, the group was trying to infiltrate the city, but it was destroyed, without providing details on the numbers involved or of casualties.

21 August

The GNA and the LNA both declared a ceasefire.

== International reactions ==
On 21 June, Egyptian President Abdel Fattah al-Sisi said that Sirte and Jufra are a "red line" for Egypt, and that Egypt will militarily intervene if the GNA and its Turkish allies take the area from the LNA. A Turkish government spokesman said that any permanent ceasefire requires a LNA withdrawal from Sirte. Saudi Arabia has also shown its support for Egypt's position, along with Jordan.

The GNA condemned the Egyptian president's statement, saying that it is "a hostile act and direct interference, and amounts to a declaration of war". Aguila Saleh Issa, the speaker of the Libyan House of Representatives, supported the statement from Sisi and Egypt's assistance against the GNA. Issa told the Egyptian media: "The Libyan people are officially asking for Egypt to interfere with military forces if the necessities of maintaining Libyan national security and Egyptian national security require this." GNA Prime minister Fayez al-Sarraj vetoed an Egyptian proposal to have an Arab League meeting to discuss the situation in Libya. President Sisi inspected the troops on Egypt's western border with Libya and said that the Egyptian military is prepared to intervene.

On 22 June, French president Emmanuel Macron condemned the role of Turkey in supporting the GNA, calling it a "dangerous game". On the same day, news emerged that Syrian militia would be sent to Libya to fight with LNA forces. Also on the same day, United States Africa Command commander General Stephen J. Townsend and U.S. Ambassador to Libya Richard Norland met Fayez al-Sarraj and his delegation in Zuwara near the Tunisian border. On 24 June, Italy's foreign minister, Luigi Di Maio, met Fayez al-Sarraj in Tripoli to stress "the need to resume the political process and end foreign interference". On 10 July, Egypt starts raising military readiness as it prepares for a potential showdown with Turkey over Libya.
