= Gulf of Sidra offensive =

Gulf of Sidra offensive may refer to any one of several military operations launched during the Libyan Crisis:

- First Gulf of Sidra offensive, fought 26 to 30 March 2011
- Second Gulf of Sidra offensive, fought 22 August to 20 October 2011
- Gulf of Sidra Offensive (2017), fought 3 to 14 March 2017
- Gulf of Sidra Offensive (2018), fought 11 to 21 June 2018
