= 2012 Kufra conflict =

Armed conflict in Libya

- Part of the Post-civil war violence in Libya
- Map of Libya with Kufra district highlighted
Date	12 February – 1 July 2012 (4 months, 2 weeks and 5 days)
Location	Kufra, Cyrenaica, Libya
Result	Ceasefire: On 24 February Libyan army troops arrive in Kufra to enforce peace between the tribes; On 10 June new clashes between Tobu tribe and government forces erupted

Belligerents
Zuwayya tribe	(Libya) Libyan National Army	Toubou tribe: Toubou Front for the Salvation of Libya

Commanders and leaders
Unknown	Maj. Gen. Yousef Mangoush; Wissam Bin Hamid	Abdul Majid Essa

Casualties and losses
February fighting: 23–27 killed,* 53 wounded; June fighting: 15 killed	6 killed	February fighting: 113 killed,* 241 wounded; April fighting: 12 killed, 35 wounded; June fighting: 55 killed*
- 4 unidentified killed and 10 wounded *50+ civilians among those killed in the February fighting, at least 5 civilians among those killed in the June fighting

The 2012 Kufra conflict started in the aftermath of the Libyan civil war, and involved armed clashes between the Tobu and Zuwayya tribes in the Kufra area of Cyrenaica, Libya.

== Background and causes ==
On 12 and 13 February, 17 people were killed and 22 wounded in fighting between the Tobu and Zuwayya tribes in Kufra. Nine of the fatalities were from the Zuwayya and eight from the Tobu. Initially, only small-arms fire was used in the clashes, but on the second day the situation escalated, with RPGs and anti-aircraft guns being used. According to the Zuwayya, the fighting started when a young man from their tribe was killed three days before by three Tobu members. A head of the local National Transitional Council (NTC) militia reported that the Zuwayya man was a smuggler and was killed after he opened fire on a Tobu militia, which was charged with combating illegal trafficking, killing five of the militiamen. The Tobu, on their part, stated that they were being attacked by the Zuwayya, who were supported by the NTC, with the intention of exterminating them. The Tobu claimed discrimination by the Zuwayya, due to them being dark-skinned, on an even higher level than during the Gaddafi-era. Farhat Abdel Karim Bu Hareg, the coordinator of social affairs in the local Kufra government said that they would have to declare independence of the region if the NTC did not act against attacks by mercenaries, referring to Tobu fighters.

The region already experienced unrest during the rule of Muammar Gaddafi. In 2008, an uprising was suppressed by the Libyan army using helicopter gunships.

== Timeline ==
=== February 2012 ===
On 14 February, clashes continued around Kufra, with the NTC sending reinforcement to help the Zuwayya tribe. Tobu spokesmen said that they were besieged and were being heavily shelled by the Zuwayya, and added that it was an attempt to exterminate the Tobu tribe with government participation. An NTC spokesman stated that it was a low-level fight between revolutionaries and weapons smugglers backed by foreign elements. A Tobu member claimed five of his comrades were killed in the new round of fighting, while another stated that there were no deaths, only injuries. The fighting continued, and on 15 and 16 February, another 15 Zuwayya were killed and 45 wounded. The Tobu reported that since the start of the clashes 55 of their members had been killed and 117 wounded, with the wounded not being able to be evacuated via the airport due to it being controlled by the Zuwayya.

On 18 February, more clashes in Kufra left another two people dead. At this point, it was reported that the military sent reinforcements to the region, in an attempt to stop the tribal fighting.

On 21 February, a Red crescent worker reported that 50 civilians were killed in the past 24 hours in Kufra due to mortar and rockets being fired on residential area. A spokesman of the Zuwayya tribe said that three people were killed and 25 injured.

The leader of the Tobu tribe Issa Abdelmajid, stated that 113 Tobu were killed (including six children) and 241 wounded in 10 days of fighting. For their part, the Zuwayya said 23 of their tribesmen were killed and 53 wounded.

On 22 February, four people were killed and 10 injured in renewed fighting. NTC leader Abdul Jalil said that Gaddafi loyalists were seeding sedition in Kufra but did not elaborate.

On 23 February, the Libyan National Army was dispatched to Kufra to enforce the peace. Army commandos had reportedly taken control of the airport, city and whole region, according to Zuwayya tribal sources inside the city and both tribes used the renewed peace for evacuation of wounded to Tripoli.

On 24 February, fighting resumed in Kufra, injuring several people, according to both tribes, with each blaming the other for the renewed fighting. A security official from the Zuwayya tribe stated that the army had not done anything to prevent the clashes. Later during the day, an ICRC medic confirmed that fighting de-escalated but the situation remained tense. The ICRC also evacuated 28 wounded patients from both tribes to Tripoli hospital.

On 25 February, a United Nations team started providing relief supplies. Georg Charpentier, an UN Resident and Humanitarian Coordinator in Libya and chief of UNSMIL mission, confirmed that a ceasefire between the tribes was holding with the Libyan army contingent in place to prevent further clashes. NTC chairman Jalil urged both tribes to make peace.

=== April 2012 ===
On 20 April, fighting erupted after Zuwayya tribesmen reportedly killed a Tobu man. Three people were killed and 17 wounded in subsequent fighting, all of them Tobu. Three government soldiers were also wounded. By the evening on 21 April, 12 people had been killed and 35 wounded on the Tobu side.

=== June 2012 ===
On 10 June, fighting flared up again in Kufra. Tobu tribesmen were engaged in clashes with former rebels who had become members of the new Libyan National Army. A Kufra official said the Tobu had launched an attack on the city with tanks and other heavy weapons. A Tobu representative said it was the tribe that had come under attack. He said the fighting had erupted after the former militiamen, known as the Libya Shield Battalion, had shelled the tribe's district. But a local security official said an attack on a security checkpoint in the town triggered the violence. The fighting continued into the next day and at least 23 people were killed. Among the dead were 20 Tobu tribesmen, including at least 15 tribal fighters, and three government soldiers.

Six more people, including two soldiers, were killed in renewed fighting in Kufra on 26 June. The fighting died down later in the evening. However, the fighting continued late on 27 June and for the next three days another 47 people were killed and 100 wounded. 32 of the dead were from the Tobu tribe, 14 were from the Zwai tribe and one was a government soldier.

== Aftermath ==
According to UNSMIL mission more than 100 people were killed in the fighting, half of Kufra population had fled the fighting and more than 200 foreign migrants were waiting as of 29 February for evacuation. Associated Press journalist on the ground also witnessed at least 160 houses demolished by rocket attacks in one neighbourhood alone with the shelling also hitting a school where civilians were seeking shelter.
