= Gulf of Sidra Offensive (2017) =

- Part of the Second Libyan Civil War
- Map of the initial GNS offensive. GNS gains were later reversed.
Date	3 March 2017 – 14 March 2017
Location	Coast of the Gulf of Sidra, Libya
Result	Libyan National Army victory: Benghazi Defense Brigades capture a strip of coastal territory between Nofaliya and Ras Lanuf, and transfer it to Government of National Accord.; On 14 March 2017, LNA recaptures all lost positions in a counter-offensive.

Belligerents
(Libya) General National Congress: (Libya) Benghazi Defense Brigades; Mercenaries (allegedly); Supported by: Misratan militias (Libya) Government of National Accord (After 7 March): Petroleum Facilities Guard	(Libya) House of Representatives: Libyan National Army; Libyan Air Force; Mercenaries (allegedly); Supported by: United Arab Emirates (allegedly)

Commanders and leaders
(Libya) Brig. Mustafa al-Shirksi (Libya) Idris Bukhamada (After 7 March)	(Libya) Field Marshal Khalifa Haftar

The Gulf of Sidra Offensive was an offensive of the Second Libyan Civil War. It was launched by the Benghazi Defense Brigades on 3 March 2017, and initially resulted in them taking control of a strip of coastal territory between the towns of Nofaliya and Ras Lanuf, which was then handed over to the Government of National Accord. A number of significant oil ports are located in this area, sometimes referred to as the Oil Crescent. The loss of the Oil Crescent was perceived by analysts as a major blow to the power of Field Marshal Khalifa Haftar.

On 14 March, Haftar's Libyian National Army (LNA) recaptured all positions lost to the Benghazi Defence and Misratan Brigades in a counter-offensive after several days of aerial bombardment.

== Background ==
The oil ports targeted in the offensive had been under the control of the Libyan National Army, which supports the Tobruk-based elected parliament, since September 2016, when they were seized from the Petroleum Facilities Guard. The Benghazi Defense Brigades, an Islamist-dominated militia, had been founded in Spring 2016, by fighters driven from the key eastern city of Benghazi by the Libyan National Army. The BDB is allied with surviving elements of the defeated PFG.

== Offensive ==
After travelling north through the Sahara Desert from the town of Zella, the BDB simultaneously attacked the ports of Nofaliya, Bin Jawad, Sidra and Ras Lanuf on 3 March. Already overstretched by insurgents in northeastern Cyrenaica, the Libyan Air Force was unable to respond effectively to the BDB's simultaneous attacks. After a short but intense period of fighting, the Libyan National Army withdrew east, leaving the BDB in control of the ports. By 4 March, at least nine people were believed to have been killed in the offensive. Over the following days, air strikes were launched by the Libyan Air Force against the BDB, and as of 7 March, the LNA was reportedly massing forces for a counterattack, to be launched from the town of Brega, possibly with the assistance of the United Arab Emirates. Later that day, however, the BDB announced that it had handed the captured ports over to the Government of National Accord, which responded by dispatching the PFG to the area.

== Counteroffensive ==
On 9 March, after obtaining endorsement from tribal elders in Benghazi, the LNA launched a counteroffensive in the Oil Crescent, with armoured brigades being sent to the area. The following day, it was reported that airstrikes had targeted Sidra and Ras Lanuf, and that heavy fighting had broken out in Uqayla, a small town located on the frontline.

On the night of 11 March, airstrikes conducted by the Dignity Operation warplanes killed two of the Petroleum Facilities Guard (PFG) personnel, sources from the PFG reported.

On 14 March 2017, LNA have recaptured all positions lost to Benghazi Defence and Misratan Brigades in a counter-offensive after several days of air bombardment. According to local sources, 21 LNA soldiers were killed during the fighting. Meanwhile, LNA spokesman, Ahmed Al-Mismari claimed that remnants of the BDB had fled to Misrata and Jufra.

== Reactions ==
Since the offensive began, both sides have accused their opponents of deploying mercenaries. As the fighting was taking place, the House of Representatives announced on 7 March that they withdrew their support for the UN-backed peace agreement and the Government of National Accord, and called for new elections to be held by February 2018. This came as the result of the outbreak of conflict between the LNA and the Islamist militias, with the latter being supported by the GNA. The Libyan parliament is opposed to these forces and wants the GNA to condemn their actions. The parliament spokesperson Abdullah Ablaihig stated that "the GNA unity government is not legitimate any more, as well as its presidential council and anything to do with this entity."
