= 2019 Zuwarah airstrike =

Drone air strike by Libyan National Army

Coordinates: 32.9554°N 12.0218°E

- Part of the Second Libyan Civil War
- Type: Air strike
- Location: Zuwarah, Libya
- Planned by: (Libya) House of Representatives
- Target: Turkish drones in Zuwarah Airport
- Date: 16 August 2019
- Executed by: Libyan National Army
- Outcome: Successful strike on targets
- Casualties: Heavy

The 2019 Zuwarah airstrike was a drone air strike that took place on On 16 August 2019. It was perpetrated by the Libyan National Army (LNA) who attacked a warehouse housing Turkish drones in Zuwarah Airport west of Tripoli. Turkey was a major supplier of the Government of National Accord during Western Libya campaign. The warehouses were completely destroyed by the accurate airstrike. This led to the escape of the remaining militia groups after the heavy losses they suffered. The LNA's airforce also hit stores in eastern Abu Kammash where drones and ammunitions were found.
