= Field marshal (Libya) =

Five-star rank in the Libyan National Army

Field marshal Arabic: مشير
- The insignia of a field marshal as worn on epaulettes

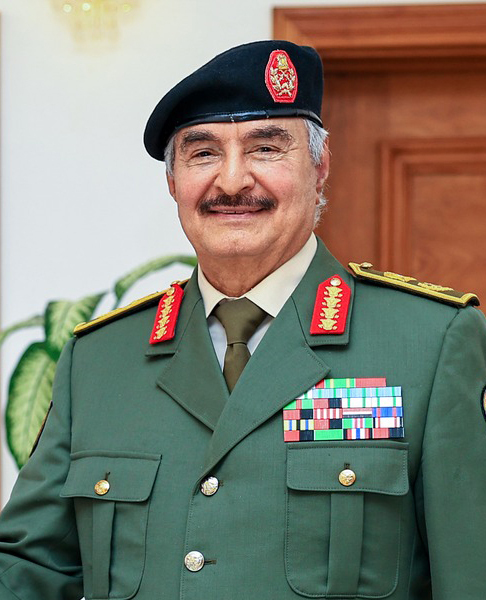
- Khalifa Haftar pictured in 2023, in service dress
- Country: Libya
- Service branch: Libyan National Army
- Abbreviation: FM
- Rank: Five-star rank
- NATO rank code: OF-10
- Non-NATO rank: O-11
- Formation: 14 September 2016
- Next higher rank: None; Brotherly Leader (De facto; rank was abolished with the 2011 Libyan Civil War)
- Next lower rank: General

The rank of field marshal (Arabic: مشير, romanized: Mushir) is a five-star rank in the current Libyan military, the Libyan National Army (LNA). General Khalifa Haftar, commander of the LNA since 2 March 2015, was promoted to the rank of field marshal on 14 September 2016 by the decision of the House of Representatives (HoR), a partially recognized legislature located in the city of Tobruk, in the eastern Libyan region of Cyrenaica.

Haftar was promoted in recognition for his leadership in the Operation Surprise Lightning, capturing the four key oil ports (Sidra, Ra's Lanuf, Brega and Zuwetina) in the Gulf of Sirte from the Petroleum Facilities Guard (PFG) during the ongoing Libyan Civil War.

== See also ==
- Libya
- Libyan National Army
