= Mangoush =

Mangoush or Al-Magoush or El-Mangoush with the definite article is an Arab surname. It may refer to:

- Muhammad Ahmad al-Mangoush (1937-2016), Libyan politician, General Secretary of People's Committee (Libyan Prime Minister)
- Najla Mangoush, Libyan lawyer, politician and government minister
- Yousef Mangoush (born 1950), Libyan Major General, Army Chief of Staff and government minister during Gaddafi's rule
