= Abdulrazek al-Nadoori =

Libyan military officer

Lieutenant General Abdulrazek al-Nadoori
- Native name: عبد الرزاق الناظوري
- Allegiance: Libya (HoR)
- Branch: Libyan Ground Forces
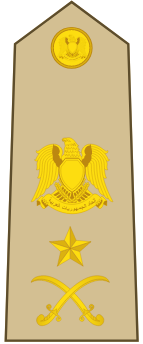
- Rank: Lieutenant General
- Commands: Chief of the General Staff

Abdulrazek al-Nadoori (Arabic: عبد الرازق الناظوري) is a Libyan military officer who has served under Khalifa Haftar in the National Liberation Army and Libyan National Army. He served as the military governor of the area between Derna and Bin Jawad from 2016 to 2018, and temporarily replaced Haftar as Chief of General Staff of the National Liberation Army in 2021.

== Career ==
Speaker of the House of Representatives Aguila Saleh Issa appointed al-Nadoori as military governor of the area in eastern Libya between Derna and Bin Jawad on 19 June 2016, and removed him on 21 July 2018. During al-Nadoori's tenure as military governor he prohibited women from travelling without a male companion and replaced multiple elected mayors with military officers. On 18 April 2018, he survived an assassination attempt in Benghazi that used a car bomb. Saleh stated that al-Nadoori's actions as governor were still valid after his removal.

Wanis Abu Khamada, a commander in the Libyan Special Forces, was dismissed on 15 February 2018, and replaced by al-Nadoori. Khalifa Haftar transferred command over a portion of his military to al-Nadoori in 2020. Al-Nadoori temporarily replaced Haftar as Chief of General Staff of the National Liberation Army from 24 September to 24 December 2021, in order for Haftar to run in the presidential election. Libyan Chief of General Staff Mohammed Al-Haddad and al-Nadoori met on 11 December 2021 to discuss unifying the different military groups of the Libyan civil war.

== Works cited ==
- "Haftar resigns temporarily from ALAF until December elections". North Africa Post. 23 September 2021. Archived from the original on 21 June 2025.
- "Haftar sacks Libya's eastern Special Force commander". Libyan Express. 17 February 2018. Archived from the original on 21 June 2025.
- "Khalifa Haftar resumes position of Commander in chief of rival Libyan army". North Africa Post. 4 February 2022. Archived from the original on 21 June 2025.
- Alharathy, Safa (22 July 2018). "Speaker of HoR says decisions of military governor Al-Nadori still valid". The Libya Observer. Archived from the original on 21 June 2025.
- Assad, Abdulkader (26 July 2020). "Haftar places some of his forces under General Staff's command". The Libya Observer. Archived from the original on 21 June 2025.
- Assad, Abdulkader (8 January 2022). "Al-Haddad meets Al-Nathori in Sirte for second time in a month". The Libya Observer. Archived from the original on 21 June 2025.
- Assad, Abdulkader (21 July 2018). "HoR Speaker removes military governor post". The Libya Observer. Archived from the original on 21 June 2025.
- Gomaa, Ahmed (18 April 2018). "Libyan General Staff Head survives assassination attempt". Egypt Today. Archived from the original on 21 June 2025.
