= 2013 Benghazi conflict =

Conflict in Libya

- Part of the Factional violence in Libya (2011–2014)
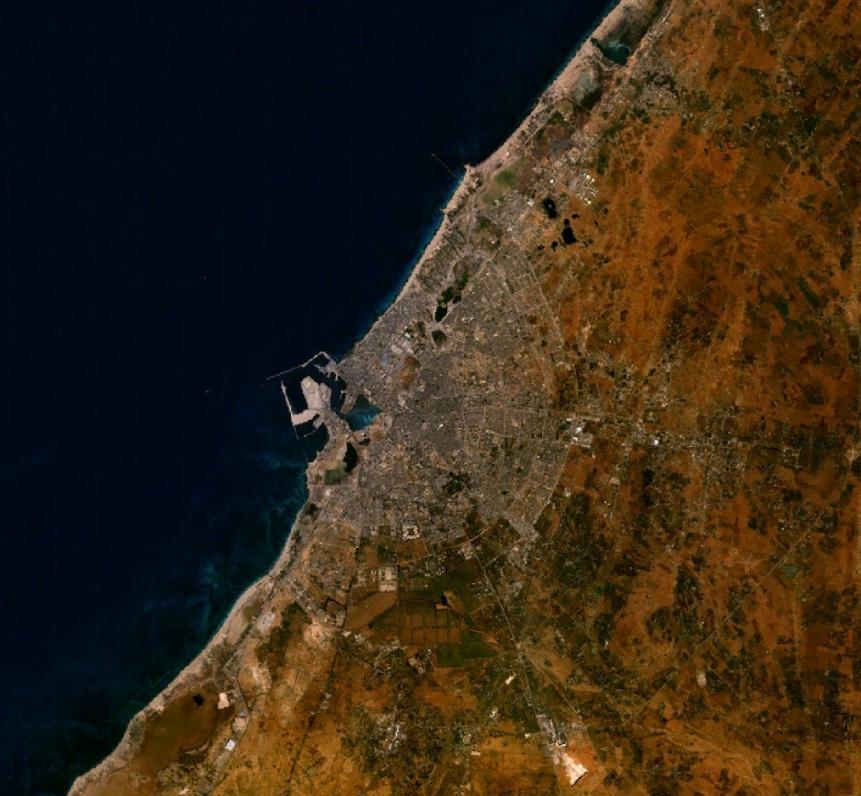
- Satellite image of Benghazi
Date	8 June 2013 – 29 July 2013 (1 month and 3 weeks)
Location	Benghazi, Libya

Belligerents
Libyan National Army; Special Forces; National Mobile Forces; Supreme Security Committee; Protesters in Benghazi	Government-sanctioned militias; Libya Shield Force	Islamists; Ansar al-Sharia

Commanders and leaders
(Libya) Ali Zeidan; Fawzi Bukatef; Amrajaa al-Mesheiti; Salahadeen Bin Omran; Mohammed al-Garabi; Hakim Buhagir; Ajmi al-Atiri	Unknown	Unknown

Strength
5,000+	Hundreds	Unknown

Casualties and losses
12 soldiers killed 1 navy colonel injured Abdelsalam al-Mosmary		Property damage
- 32 civilians killed 100+ injured

The 2013 Benghazi conflict is a part of the aftermath of the Libyan civil war, that began after clashes erupted between protesters and militants from the Libya Shield brigade on 8 June 2013.

== Background ==
Since the Libyan Civil War that toppled the Muammar Gaddafi, there has been factional fighting occurring around Libya, in particular in Benghazi (where the first protests began in 2011). The city had been the scene of a number of attacks prior to these events, including some related to the ongoing factional fighting, as well as an attack against the U.S. consulate.

== Timeline ==
=== June ===
On 8 June, at least 31 people were killed and 100 wounded in clashes in Benghazi between protesters and a militia operating with defence ministry approval. Most of the dead were civilians, with only 5 soldiers and one militia member reported killed. and one was a militiaman.

On 15 June, In the early hours of 15 June, hundreds of plain-clothed gunmen attacked several security installations across the city, at one point even forcing members of the First Infantry Brigade to abandon parts of their base as they stormed the main gate and torched parts of the building. At least six Libyan soldiers were killed during the assault – four by sniper fire and two from stabbing wounds. All of the dead were members of an elite Libyan Army unit called Saaqa. Eleven people were injured during the attacks, including several assailants. Clashes were reported near the road leading to the airport, forcing its closure. Government reinforcements were reportedly sent from the capital Tripoli. The head of Benghazi's Counter Crime Agency has suggested that Qaddafi elements were in fact behind the attacks. Colonel Sulaiman Abu-Wishah told Benghazi Radio that two members of a Qaddaf Al-Dam sabotage group have been arrested. He claimed that the group was professional, its task to cause dissension and unrest, and that it was believed to be behind a number of other attacks in Benghazi. The members of the group were believed to be supporters of the former regime.

On 19 June, a huge explosion totally flattened the police station in the Al-Hadayeq (the gardens) district of Benghazi early this morning, but miraculously there are no casualties being reported. The sound of the explosion at about 2.30 am was so loud that it was reportedly heard across most of the districts of Benghazi. It is thought that there were no casualties within the police station because the station had been closed down after an earlier attack in May. Samir Al-Lamamy, a witness and resident of the Al-Hadayeq district told Libya Herald that "the explosion led to the complete destruction of the police station leveling it to the ground".Al-Lamamy also speculated that "there might have been more than one bomb planted in the police station because the explosion was so strong that it totally destroyed it".

=== July ===
On 2 July, A car bomb exploded at a checkpoint that was being guarded by special military forces, injuring four soldiers and at least three civilians.

On 26 July, Muslim Brotherhood critic Abdelsalam al-Mosmary was fatally shot after leaving a mosque following Friday prayers during Ramadan. In the aftermath protesters attacked Muslim Brotherhood property in both Benghazi and the capital Tripoli. Two days later, buildings used by the judiciary were bombed and was then followed by clashes between an unnamed militia and the military special forces. On 29 July, an unidentified militia also attacked the Tripoli headquarters of the al-Watan party, led by Abdelhakim Belhadj. The head of the party's political office, Jamal Ashour, said: "They smashed windows, shot at the door locks to open them and threw Molotov cocktails inside. The damage is serious. No one was injured." The same day, in Benghazi a car bomb exploded and injuring a navy colonel in what was termed an "attempted assassination;" Prime Minister Ali Zeidan also said that he would reshuffle his cabinet soon. "Today we chose a figure for the defence portfolio and tomorrow [Tuesday] or the day after we are going to present a list of ministers to the General [National] Congress."

== Aftermath ==
According to The Economist, following the June fighting "Libya's leaders are celebrating what they herald as the beginning of the end of militia rule and the restoration of a functioning state", while Libya's liberals "cheer the demise of what they have seen as the armed wing of their Islamist foes."
