= 2012 Tripoli airport clashes =

- Part of Post-civil war violence in Libya
Date	4 June 2012
Location	Tripoli International Airport, Libya
Result	Government victory

Belligerents
Al-Awfea Brigade	(Libya) Libyan government

Commanders and leaders
Unknown	Hakim Buhagir Essam al-Gatous

Strength
200 militants 60–70 vehicles 2 tanks	1,500 Ministry of Interior SSC personnel 1,500 Ministry of Defence personnel

Casualties and losses
17+ militiamen arrested 4 militiamen wounded 1 tank destroyed 1 tank captured	60 wounded

The 2012 Tripoli airport clashes occurred on 4 June 2012, after members of the Al-Awfea militia stormed the Tripoli International Airport as a measure to prompt the government's release of its jailed leader, Abu Oegeila al-Hebshi.

== Background ==
The Tarhouna Al-Awfea militia group was enlisted under the command of the Libyan National Army, and performed several missions tasked by military command. On the day before the clashes, Commander Abu-Alija Habshi travelled to Tripoli with two tanks that were to be given to the army barracks. However, Habshi was stopped at a checkpoint outside of Tripoli and was asked to leave the tanks there instead; he was also informed that he needed to return to Tarhouna in order to obtain proper government documentation. However, that was the last time Habshi has been reported seen by anyone. The Libyan government has denied any involvement in Habshi's disappearance, but militiamen under the Commander's authority have alleged that the security forces are closely connected with the disappearance.

== Events ==
200 gunmen belonging to the Al-Awfea militia took control of the Tripoli International Airport and stopped all flights, after Al-Awfea militiamen ignored the ultimatum given by Defence minister Osama Juwaili to surrender the SSC and MoD forces that stormed the airport, destroyed one tank and captured the other and also arrested more than 172 Tarhouni militiamen.

== Aftermath ==
The airport remained non-functional after the clashes. Government spokesman Nasser al-Manee said that "the airport will resume operation within 24 hours. [He] heard there were some injured". The next day, on 6 June, some airlines restarted their flights from Tripoli International.

== Sources ==
- Hadeel Al Shalchi (4 June 2012) "Fighting at Tripoli airport, gunmen surround planes". Reuters. Retrieved on 18 June 2012
