= Gulf of Sidra Offensive (2018) =

- Map showing the offensive
Date	11–21 June 2018
Location	Ras Lanuf and Sidra
Result	LNA victory
Territorial changes	Ras Lanuf and Sidra are recaptured by the Tobruk government.

Belligerents
(Libya) Benghazi Defense Brigades; Supported by: Qatar (Per LNA)	(Libya) House of Representatives: Libyan National Army

Commanders and leaders
(Libya) Ibrahim Jadhran	Khalifa Haftar

Strength
Less than 1,000	Unknown

Casualties and losses
Unknown	15 killed 25 wounded

The Gulf of Sidra Offensive was an offensive of the Second Libyan Civil War. It was launched by the Benghazi Defense Brigades on 11 June 2018, and was fought concurrently with the Battle of Derna. On the first day, the Benghazi Defense Brigades captured Ras Lanuf and Sidra, before the Libyan National Army (LNA) started a counteroffensive on 17 June. On 21 June, The LNA captured Ras Lanuf and Al Sidra. Hours later, the Benghazi Defense Brigades claimed recapturing these cities once again, but the LNA denied these claims, releasing pictures showing their soldiers within Sidra and Ras Lanuf.
