= Wissam Bin Hamid =

Libyan jihadist militant

Wissam Bin Hamid was a Libyan jihadist militant and warlord.

== First Libyan Civil War ==
Bin Hamid emerged as prominent figure of anti-Gaddafi forces during the First Libyan Civil War in 2011 as the leader of a Muslim Brotherhood-affiliated battalion that included militants who had returned from Afghanistan. In the aftermath of the civil war, Bin Hamid commanded the Libya Shield brigade, deployed by the General National Congress as a buffer.

== Second Libyan Civil War ==
At the outbreak of the Second Libyan Civil War, Bin Hamid was one of the most prominent leaders of the Shura Council of Benghazi Revolutionaries (SCBR), a coalition of Islamist and jihadist militant groups fighting against the forces of Khalifa Haftar.

Ben Hamid featured prominently in a 2014 video by al-Qa'ida-aligned jihadist group Ansar al-Sharia in Libya (ASL), including sitting next to ASL's leader Muhammad al-Zahawi and praising military successes against Haftar's armies. According to analysts, ASK and SCBR illustrated the degree to which the United States misjudged its allies in Libya.

Bin Hamid was reportedly killed in a December 2016 airstrike, according to interrogations of the Shura Council's spokesman by Libyan National Army.
