= 2019 Misrata airstrike =

- Part of the Second Libyan Civil War
- Type: Air strike
- Location: Misrata, Libya
- Planned by: (Libya) House of Representatives
- Target: Anti-air defences and Turkish aircraft
- Date: 6 August 2019
- Executed by: Libyan National Army
- Outcome: Successful strike on targets
- Casualties: Heavy

On 6 August 2019, forces of the Libyan National Army (LNA) launched airstrikes on an airbase in Misrata, held by the Government of National Accord. The air force carried out several raids and targeted anti-air defences and Turkish aircraft transporting ammunition, drones and missiles. During the raids, a Turkish Ilyushin aircraft was destroyed as it landed in the Misrata airbase. This took place during the Western Libya campaign within the Second Libyan Civil War. General Mohamed Manfour reported that the operation was precise and successful.
