= 2012 Zintan clashes =

- Part of Post-civil war violence in Libya
Date	11 – 18 June 2012 (1 week)
Location	Zintan, Mizda and Shegayga, Libya
Result	NTC control reestablished

Belligerents
Zintan fighters Guntrara tribe	(Libya) Libyan government	Mashashya tribe

Commanders and leaders
Unknown	Col Hamed Zwei	Unknown
- 105 dead ~500 wounded

The 2012 Zintan clashes begun on 17 June 2012, after a Zintan man was killed after stopping at a checkpoint during an attempted transport of tanks from a weapons depot in Mizda to Zintan.

During the Gaddafi era, land was often taken from one tribe and diapered to others, creating and exacerbating tensions between the tribes. Long standing resentment was further compounded with groups such as the Mashashya tribe choosing not to join in the rebellion against Gaddafi, whilst fighters from Zintan played a prominent role, fighting in favour of the NTC.

As a result of the fierce fighting between the different tribes, government troops were deployed to the area on 17 June. The area was subsequently declared a military zone. The deployment of soldiers and imposition of a government enforced ceasefire managed to prevent further clashes, with Government spokesman Nasser al-Manaa declaring that fighting had ended on 18 June.
