= Siege of Bani Walid (2012) =

- Part of Post-civil war violence in Libya
Date	9 September – 26 October 2012 (1 month, 2 weeks and 3 days)
Location	Bani Walid, Libya
Result	Marginal Pro-Government victory; Libyan government recaptures the city of Bani Walid; Sporadic attacks continue in the city in mid-December

Belligerents
Pro-government forces; Libya Shield; Misratan militia	(Libya) Pro-Gaddafi forces; Warfalla tribe; Brigade 93

Commanders and leaders
(Libya) Mohammed Magariaf (Libya) Abdurrahim El-Keib; Yousef Mangoush	(Libya) Col. Salim al Waer

Strength
2,000 Libyan Army; 10,000~ Libya Shield	600 (Misratan claim)

Casualties and losses
32 killed, 244 wounded	26–31 fighters and civilians killed, 103+ wounded
- 130 civilians killed (Bani Walid elder claim); 22 civilians killed (state news agency claim)

The siege of Bani Walid was a military conflict in Libya.

== History ==
Bani Walid is an oasis town in western Libya which has a historic rivalry with the city of Misrata. During the civil war in 2011, Bani Walid remained a bastion of support for the government of Muammar Gaddafi until the very end of the war, while Misrata was one of the first towns to rise up, emerging victorious from a months-long siege. After the end of the war, a number of Misratan militias made efforts to capture those people who they believed were linked to the previous government.

After a string of abuses, local fighters in Bani Walid retook control of their town and expelled the new government from the city. The brigade was then involved in revenge kidnappings with Misrata during the majority of 2012.

In July, while they were holding two Misratan journalists, fighters in Bani Walid captured and tortured Misratan militiaman Omran Shaaban, one of the original captors of Gaddafi at the end of the battle of Sirte. He died later of his wounds. In response, the Libyan Congress authorized the use of force against Bani Walid to capture those responsible for the deaths, setting a deadline of 5 October for the town to peacefully comply. The local government of Bani Walid rejected the decision, stating that no true judiciary system existed in Libya.

Following this event, the armed forces of the new government and allied independent militias mounted a siege on the city.

== Fighting ==
At the end of September, the Libyan Shield brigade from the Libyan government and Misrata militias cut the roads leading to Bani Walid, preventing civilian supplies from entering the city. Amnesty International protested against the siege of the city.

On 2 October, clashes erupted between the pro-government militias from Misrata and local militiamen in Bani Walid. One person was killed and 5-10 were wounded.

On 10 October, violent clashes erupted between Bani Walid militias and Misrata militias in the valley of Mardum, 10 km east of Bani Walid. One Bani Walid fighter was killed and two others injured, while the overall death toll was put at 10 killed. 5-10 civilians died due to shelling by the Misrata militias while some supplies were successfully delivered to the city.

On 17 October, Bani Walid was shelled once again as ground clashes raged. Five government militiamen were killed and 44 wounded in the fighting, while seven Bani Walid residents died in the shelling and 75 were wounded.

On 18 October, around 2,000 Libyan National Army units and its aligned militias, mainly from city of Misrata, started, after failed negotiations between the government and the local council, full-scale attack on Bani Walid. Army spokesman claimed that army moved quickly and secured town airport and was closing to city centre. This was denied by residents of the town who claimed that the airport was still under local militias control and that the army had not entered the town. Meanwhile, the chief of staff, Yussef al-Mangush said that the army will be sent to the city and will take over to impose security. He added that he hoped that the army would be able to enter the city peacefully.

On 19 October, the Misrata militias and the Libyan army had pulled back, and the president of the transitional congress imposed a 48-hour ceasefire, condemning the "unauthorized assault" of the Misrata and government forces. Eight government soldiers and militiamen were killed in the fighting, while 12 people from Bani Walid, fighters and residents. A Libyan officer told that the ceasefire was to allow civilians to leave the city, but locals said that they won't leave their city.

Their closest position to Bani Walid was some 25 miles from the town itself, a point captured during the offensive between 16 and 18 October. Despite claims from Margarief that the resolution needed to be peaceful, the Libyan Army and its allied militia was preparing another assault, moving heavy weapons and ammunition to the battlefield.

The shelling on the city and its outskirts continued and the ceasefire was ignored, with five residents, including a child, killed and 40 houses destroyed by the rockets fired by the militias. The shelling was concentrated on the Valley of Mardoum. The military commander of Bani Walid stated that his forces were still in full control of the city. Libyan Shields forces and Misrata militias stated that their offensive had been sanctioned by the government, while a military official denied it, adding to the confusion. The talks between Bani Walid and pro Misrata government forces for a negotiated solution collapsed.

On 20 October, Misrata militias launched another assault against Bani Walid, trying to push into the city center. At least nine Misrata soldiers were killed and 122 others were injured. The death toll was later updated to 22 Misrata soldiers killed and more than 200 wounded, while Bani Walid casualties numbered to four killed, including a young girl and 23 injured.

Some civilians were leaving Bani Walid because of the random shelling killing civilians and the lack of food and drink. Militiamen said that they had a list of wanted people inside Bani Walid and that there were in addition hundreds more gunmen defending the city.

On 21 October, the shelling from Misrata militias on the city resumed with smoke flying over some parts of the city, Abdelkarim Ghomaid, a Bani Walid commander reported. He added that they had captured 16 armed cars from Misrata militias. The fighting on the ground resumed as well for a fifth day after Misrata and government forces regrouped after the bloody losses suffered the previous day. A resident told that clashes happened on the outskirts of the city, but that they were less intense than the previous day. A Misrata militiamen said that the fighters in Bani Walid were well armed and that fighting continued at the Wadi Dinar, gates, 30 miles away from the city centre and that they traded fire from two hilltops. He added that the battle was going to take some time.

In Tripoli, around 500 protesters invaded the grounds of the Libyan parliament to protest against the attacks on Bani Walid.

On 22 October, more clashes near the town left another two pro-government fighters dead.

On 23 October Colonel Ali al-Shekhili claimed that the Army has control of the airport, hospital and other important places. The Airport takeover, together with the military occupation of Mordum, Shmeagh and Tniena districts on the outskirts was confirmed by one of the refugees who fled the city. The Colonel said that the Army met little resistance and said that they are shelling the city. A local said that the Army is entering the city with bulldozers demolishing houses.

On 24 October, pro-government fighters mostly from Libya Shield brigade, militia under command of the Ministry of Defence, took control of centre of the city. Army and militia units still faced resistance in certain parts of the town. The defenders had retreated from the city to the nearby valleys.

On 25 October, Muammar Gaddafi loyalists hold out in last stand at Bani Walid, just to be scattered by the next day when pro-government forces freely roamed the city.

== Aftermath ==
On 30 October, Libyan Minister of Defence Osama al-Juwail came into conflict with army chief-of-staff Yousef Mangoush over the control of the army over the oasis town. While Mangoush claimed that military operations have ceased and town is under its control, the defence minister stated that militia outside the army's command, not the army itself, are in control of Bani Walid. This was not the first time when Mangoush and Juwail have disagreed, with minister being strongly in favour of greater ministry, rather than military, control over the army.

Refugees were also reportedly not allowed to return to their homes, and journalists were forbidden to enterto the city by soldiers and militiamen manning the checkpoints on the outskirts of the city, despite army promises of right of return.

On 1 November, an AFP reporter was able to enter the town and reported heavy damage from the fighting. The residential area near the university, several buildings in the Gweida district and several public buildings were destroyed by fire, which was blamed by a local medic on militias from both Bani Walid and Misrata, as well as with common criminals. The correspondent also witnessed three separate incidents of thefts by Misratan militiamen. The town still remained largely empty, with only a few police and army patrols in the centre.

On 16 December, fresh fighting breaks out in Bani Walid. Members of the security forces clashed with armed men in the central Dahra area of Bani Walid today, leaving three members of the armed force dead and a number of other security personnel injured. AFP - Armed men killed four policemen and two soldiers Sunday in separate attacks in Libya, including one in a former bastion of Moamer Kadhafi's regime that was toppled last year, security officials said.

On October 5, 2013 Gunmen killed at least 12 Libyan soldiers in an attack on a checkpoint near the city of Bani Walid, a former stronghold of supporters of Muammar Gadhafi, security officials said on Saturday. The ambush happened on the road between Bani Walid and the town of Tarhouna, where the army had a checkpoint. They came under heavy gunfire. Between 12 and 15 soldiers were killed," said Ali Sheikhi, a spokesman for the army joint chief of staff.
