= 2019 Murzuq airstrike =

- Part of the Second Libyan Civil War
- Type: Air strike
- Location: Murzuq, Libya
- Planned by: (Libya) House of Representatives
- Target: Chadian militants
- Date: 5 August 2019
- Executed by: Libyan National Army
- Casualties: 43 killed, 60 injured

On 5 August 2019, a drone airstrike by Khalifa Haftar's Libyan National Army (LNA) hit the town hall in the southern Libyan town of Murzuq and killed 43 people and injured 60. The LNA confirmed the airstrike but denied it had targeted any civilians. It claimed its strike had targeted “Chadian opposition fighters,” referring to Tebu tribesmen opposing them in the area. Haftar's forces had captured Murzuq earlier on 22 February 2019 as part of the Southern Libya offensive to control the oil-producing south, but had later withdrawn from the town.
