= Igirigi APC =

Nigerian armoured personnel carrier

- Place of origin: Nigeria

Service history
- Used by: Nigeria Army
- Wars: Boko Haram insurgency

Specifications

The Igirigi APC is an armoured personnel carrier manufactured by the Nigerian Army. Designed and manufactured by the army Corps of Engineers, the APC was first introduced to the media during the 2012 Nigeria Army Day celebrations (NADCEL). While actual specs of the vehicle are still undisclosed, observers noted the remote control weapons station, and its IED-deflecting, V-shaped hull.

The Chief of Army Staff (COAS), Lt.-Gen. Azubuike Ihejirika, said the local production of APC had saved the nation at least 30 per cent of the cost of the foreign version and that the unveiling of the APC was part of the ongoing reform in the military and in line with the transformation agenda of the Jonathan administration.

In 2013, during events to mark the 150th anniversary of the Nigeria Army, A desert camouflaged Igirigi with a 20mm gun led the parade of vehicles drawn up from various formations in the country at the Armed Forces review, which took place at Abuja.

Significant numbers of the Igirigi are being fielded by the NA which plans to deploy them in large numbers for internal security and COIN but details of the location of manufacture and assembly are still unknown
