= Libyan Arab Armed Forces =

Military of the Libyan House of Representatives

- القوات المسلحة العربية الليبية
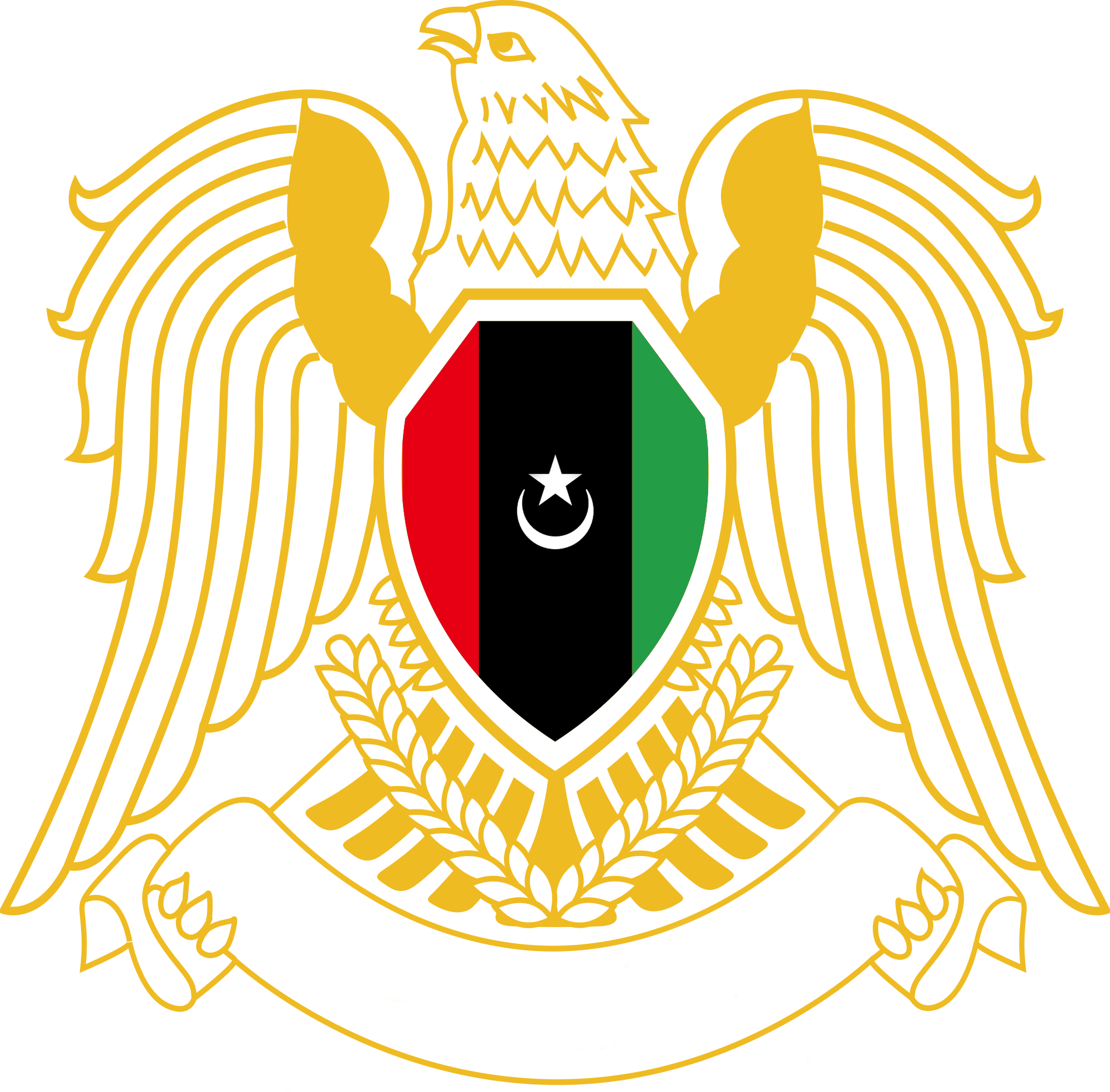
- Emblem
- Other name: Libyan Arab Army; Libyan National Army; Haftar Armed Forces
- Commander-in-chief: Khalifa Haftar (de facto); Speaker of the Libyan House of Representatives (currently: Al-Salhin El-Obeidi) (de jure)
- Supreme Commander (official title: General Commander / Chief of the Libyan Arab Armed Forces): Khalifa Haftar
- Deputy Supreme Commander (Deputy Chief): Saddam Haftar
- Chief of General Staff: Khalid Haftar
- Chief of Staff of Ground Forces: Saddam Haftar
- Spokesperson: Major General. Ahmed Al-Mismari
- Founded: 2011, 2014 (current form)
- Dates active: 2011–present
- Split from: Libyan National Army (General National Congress)
- Country: Libya
- Allegiance: (Libya) Libyan House of Representatives; Government of National Stability (currently)
- Groups: Libyan National Army; Libyan Air Forces (pro-LAAF); Libyan Navy (pro-LAAF)
- Headquarters: Ar Rajma, Libya
- Active regions: Eastern, central and southern Libya
- Ideology: Arab nationalism Secularism; Nasserism; Militarism; Anti-imperialism; Factions: Salafism; Gaddafism
- Status: active; controls East Libya (80% of Libya)
- Size: 25,000 (2018); 85,000+ (2020)
- Wars: List: Factional violence in Libya; 2012 Kufra conflict; 2012 Sabha conflict; Siege of Bani Walid; 2013 Benghazi conflict; Second Libyan Civil War; Battle of Benghazi (2014); Battle of Benina Airport; Battle of Benghazi (2014–2017); Siege of Derna (2016–2019); Derna campaign (2014–2016); 2015 Egyptian airstrikes; Battle of Traghan; Gulf of Sidra Offensive (2017); Gulf of Sidra Offensive (2018); Southern Libya offensive; Battle of Sabha (2019); 2019 Murzuq airstrike; Western Libya campaign; 2019 Misrata airstrike; 2019 Zuwarah airstrike; Battle of Sirte (2020); Central Libya offensive; 2020 Al-Watiya airstrike; 2022 Tripoli clashes; Sudanese civil war (2023–present); Battle of Gabal El Uweinat

The Libyan Arab Armed Forces (LAAF), (Note: Arabic: القوات المسلحة العربية الليبية, romanized: al-Qūwāt al-Musallaḥah al-ʻArabīyah al-Lībīyah) also known as the Libyan Arab Army (Note: Arabic: الجيش العربي الليبي, al-Jaysh al-'Arabiyy al-Lībii) or better known as the Libyan National Army (LNA), (Note: Arabic: الجيش الوطني الليبي, al-jaysh al-waṭaniyy al-Lībii) are the armed forces of the Libyan faction led by Khalifa Haftar. They were, nominally, a unified national force under the command of Haftar when he was nominated to the role on 2 March 2015 by the House of Representatives, consisting at the time of a ground force, an air force and a navy. they're nominally the armed forces of the Libyan House of Representatives since 2014.

On 16 May 2014, LNA launched Operation Dignity, a military campaign against the General National Congress (GNC) and armed militias and Islamist militant organizations. When the internationally recognised Government of National Accord (GNA) was established in Tripoli, part of the Libyan military forces were named the Libyan Army to contrast with the other part that retained the LNA identity. In the Second Libyan Civil War, the LNA was loyal to the Libyan House of Representatives that met in Tobruk, internationally recognised until the creation of the Government of National Accord (GNA) in October 2015. The LNA also fights against the Shura Council of Benghazi Revolutionaries, as well as Islamic State in Libya which was a common enemy for both LNA and the Libyan Army.

About half of the LNA consists of militias including Madkhali (Salafist) militias and Sudanese, Chadian and Russian mercenaries, which together constitute part of the LNA's effective forces. The LNA possesses its own air force. Most of the Libyan Navy is loyal to the GNU.

Interventions in the political system by the LNA include the late 2016 replacement of nine elected municipal councils out of a total of 27, replacing elected mayors by mostly military individuals and, according to witnesses cited by The Independent, the 17 July 2019 abduction of House of Representatives member Seham Sergiwa at her home in Benghazi by the 106th Brigade. The LNA stated that it was not responsible for the Sergiwa abduction.

== Name ==
The Libyan National Army official name is the Libyan Arab Armed Forces (LAAF) after 2014.

Its name was due to the pre-2014 military of Libya being called the Libyan National Army, and parts of it became loyal to Field Marshal. Khalifa Haftar, those parts became the modern LNA.

In November 2019, the United Nations Panel of Experts on Libya established under United Nations Security Council Resolution 1973 started using the name Haftar Armed Forces (HAF) to replace the name Libyan National Army to refer to "all armed groups associated with Haftar". It also chose to use lower case regarding "brigades" and "battalions" in order to avoid giving them "the legitimacy of being a formed military unit of a government".

== Allies ==
Haftar and the LNA is de facto backed by the governments of Egypt, Saudi Arabia, Russia and the United Arab Emirates. France has also provided tacit backing for Haftars forces. France carried out unprecedented air strikes by its Airforce on Chadian opposition fighters, which are LNA's biggest opponents. This resulted in a public dispute with Italy, which is supporting the Government of National Accord (GNA) in Tripoli.

Russia is Haftar's most committed ally. In May 2020 the US Africa Command (AFRICOM) stated that Russia had deployed at least 14 MiG planes to the country. The plans were supported by private military contractors of Wagner Group and supporting the LNA. In addition, an unknown quantity of Sukhoi Su-24 aircraft were supplied by Russia to the LNA, these are operated by Russian mercenaries.

== Structure ==
- Libyan National Army
  - Ground Forces (pro-LAAF)
    - [regular units]
    - [Militias]
    - [Foreign units]
  - Special Forces
  - Military Intelligence Administration
  - Air Defense Forces (pro-LAAF)
- Libyan Air Forces (pro-LAAF parts)
- Libyan Navy (pro-LAAF parts)

== Leadership ==
Khalifa Haftar was made head of the armed forces of Libya on 2 March 2015, remaining as leader of the Libyan National Army after the split between the LNA and the Government of National Accord (GNA). As of December 2017, Major General Abdulrazek al-Nadoori was the chief of staff of the LNA. A lobbying firm was paid US$450,000 to lobby on his behalf for 12 months, starting 1 December 2017, in Washington, D.C. Mahmoud al-Werfalli, known internationally for his International Criminal Court arrest warrant under Article 8(2)(c)(i) of the Rome Statute, was Axes Commander in the al-Saiqa unit of the LNA as of August 2017.

Other senior leaders include:

- Legal/de jure commander-in-chief Al-Salhin El-Obeidi (President of the Libyan House of Representatives).
- Supreme commander (de facto commander-in-chief) Field Marshal Khalifa Haftar, official title: Chief of the Libyan Arab Armed Forces (literal translation: General Commander of the Libyan Arab Armed Forces) (Arabic: القائد العام للقوات المسلحة العربية الليبية)
- Chief of Staff of the Libyan Air Force Major General Saqr Geroushi.
- Chief of Military Intelligence Administration Vawzi Mansoori (dead)
- Libyan Special Forces Major General Wanis Bukhamada.
- Head of Operations Major General Abdulsalam al-Hasy.
- Official Spokesperson of the LAAF and Commander of the pro-LAAF Air Defense Forces Major General. Ahmed al-Mesmary.
- Head of Darna Operations Room Major General. Salim al-Rifady al-Obaidy.

== Ground forces ==
=== Regular forces ===
As of May 2019, the LNA had about 7000 regular forces. These include:

==== 106th Brigade ====
In April 2019, the 106th Brigade, also known as Awlia Aldem (Arabic: أوليء الدم) was led by Khaled, son of Khalifa Haftar. As of June 2019, the brigade's commander was Salem Rahil.

On 17 July 2019, according to witnesses cited by The Independent and a family member cited by CNN, 25–30 masked, uniformed 106th Brigade members abducted member of the Libyan House of Representatives Seham Sergiwa in Benghazi. The LNA stated that it was not responsible for the abduction. As of 17 October 2019, after multiple calls by UNSMIL for the LNA to investigate the disappearance, Sergiwa remained missing.

==== 73rd Brigade Mechanized infantry ====
Leader: Saleh al-Quta'ani (Aug 2019)

==== Tariq Ben Zeyad Battalion ====
Leader: Omar Mraje' (Aug 2019) (de jure), Saddam Haftar (de facto)

==== 9th Brigade ====
Leader: Kani brothers; origin: Tarhuna (Aug 2019)

==== 128th Battalion ====
Leader: Hassan al-Zadma; many Mahamid members (Aug 2019)

==== 116th Battalion ====
Leader: Massoud Jiddu (Aug 2019)

==== 124th Brigade ====
Leader:

==== 309th Brigade Mechanized infantry ====
Leader:

==== 1st Brigade ====
Leader:

==== 166th Brigade Mechanized infantry ====
Leader:

==== 188th Brigade infantry ====
Leader:

==== 5th Brigade infantry ====
Leader:

==== 115th Brigade Mechanized infantry ====
Leader:

==== 82nd Brigade infantry ====
Leader:

=== Special forces ===
Al-Saiqa is an elite army unit, formed from a mixture of paratroopers and commandos. It numbers a few thousand and reports to the Ministry of Defence. It is popular in Benghazi, particularly in light of its opposition to Islamist Ansar al-Sharia group and because it is seen as a symbol of the reborn Libyan armed forces.

=== Militias ===
Madkhali militias in the LNA include the Tawhid Battalion commanded by Izz al-Din al-Tarhuni; the Tariq Ibn Ziyad Brigade, the Subul al-Salam group and the al-Wadi Brigade. LNA groups from Sabratha, Sorman, Tiji and Badr, towns in which Madkhali preachers were active and supported Haftar, are mostly Madkhali Salafists.

During the 2019–20 Western Libya campaign, the LNA was allied with the al-Kaniyat militia in Tarhuna.

The number of auxiliary LNA forces (militias and mercenaries) was estimated in May 2019 as 18000 by Jason Pack of the Institute for International Political Studies.

=== Foreign mercenaries ===
Foreign mercenaries operating during 2019 Western Libya offensive on behalf of the LNA include Sudanese, Chadians and Russians.

Sudanese from the Sudan Liberation Movement/Army (Minnawi) were present in Libya starting in March 2015 and fought on behalf of the LNA in 2016. SLM (Minnawi) planned on leaving Libya in early 2017. Sudan Liberation Movement/Army (al-Nur) fighters fought on behalf of the LNA, with 1500 personnel in Libya in mid-2016. Involvement of Sudanese mercenaries continued in 2018. On 25 July 2019, 1000 members of the Sudanese Rapid Support Forces, widely attributed to be responsible for the 3 June 2019 Khartoum massacre, arrived in Libya and were expected to number 4000 in total.

Chadians from the Rally of Democratic Forces (French: Rassemblement des Forces Démocratique) were recruited by the LNA in late 2015, especially in the southern part of Libya.

There were an estimated 200 Russian Wagner Group mercenaries in the LNA in 2019.

On 1 January 2022, the 5+5 Libyan Joint Military Commission announced the deportation of 300 Sudanese mercenaries linked to the LNA from the Eastern Region.

== History ==
=== 2011–2013 ===
The Libyan National Army was founded in 2011 by the National Transitional Council, after forces aligned to it defeated the previous Libyan Army and overthrew Muammar Gaddafi's government. Supply depots and bases having been damaged during the civil war, the new army is faced with the challenge of having to rebuild much of the country's military infrastructure. Yousef Mangoush was named as its first Chief of Staff on 2 January 2012 and the force saw its first major deployment on 23 February, when it was deployed to Kufra to intervene in a tribal conflict.

In November 2011, the National Transitional Council began the difficult process of restructuring the army, with military personnel who defected from the Gaddafi government and former rebel fighters of the National Liberation Army forming the basis of the new Libyan Army. Major General Khalifa Belgacem Haftar was chosen as the overall commander of the new Libyan Army due to his military experience and loyalty to the revolution that overthrew Gaddafi.

The Libyan Army only numbered "a few thousand" trained soldiers in November 2011, and was rapidly trying to train up new fighters who could keep the peace nationwide and deter rogue militias from acting without NTC orders, and was responsible for brokering a ceasefire on at least one occasion in November between warring militas from Zawiya and Al Maya.

On 1 December 2011, it was reported that the National Liberation Army was to integrate up to 50,000 former rebel fighters into the new Libyan national army and police forces, with the aid of French training, with long-term aims to integrate as many as 200,000 fighters from the brigades that had fought against Gaddafi during the civil war.

In December 2011, Italy agreed to provide training to the Libyan Army as it attempted to reorganize in the aftermath of the Civil War.

Also in December, large numbers of former rebels were being given jobs in the new army, whilst the government also announced that they would be free to join the special forces and the Navy too. According to Osama al-Juwaili, the defence minister: "The idea is to inject new blood in the army which was marginalised by the tyrant (Gaddafi)"

General Yousef Mangoush said on 5 January 2012 that Libya's new army faces major obstacles such as rebuilding bases destroyed during the conflict, as well as disarming militias that were not part of the new army. National Army commander General Khalifa Haftar said later that it could take between three and five years for Libya to field a capable enough army to protect its borders.

On 7 May 2013, Libya's Defense Minister Mohammed al-Barghathi resigned due to a crisis caused by gunmen who have besieged two ministries for more than a week, a ministry official said. He later withdrew his resignation after Prime Minister Zeidan convinced him to stay.

Under an agreement reached at the Lough Erne G8 summit in June 2013, NATO countries the United Kingdom, Italy, Turkey, and the United States undertook to help train up to 15,000 personnel from Libyan National Army units over a two-year period. They were to take units from newly formed brigades for 10-week stints of intensive infantry training. The 27th Brigade was due to start at Bassingbourn in eastern England in January 2014. As a result of disorder and sexual assaults by some Libyan army cadets, the UK cancelled the programme in November 2014. The Libyan trainees were sent back to Libya, with the exception of five who were tried for sexual offenses.

=== 2016 overthrow of mayors ===
In late 2016, Major-General Abdulrazek al-Nadoori of the LNA replaced several of the elected municipal mayors in eastern Libya by unelected people, mostly military. Altogether the LNA replaced nine elected councils, out of 27 in its area of control, by military administrators.

=== 2025 ===
In May 2025, days after the 2025 Tripoli clashes, the LNA held a large military parade showing off advanced equipment in Benghazi, including the BM-30 Smerch and the Tor missile system.

== Equipment ==
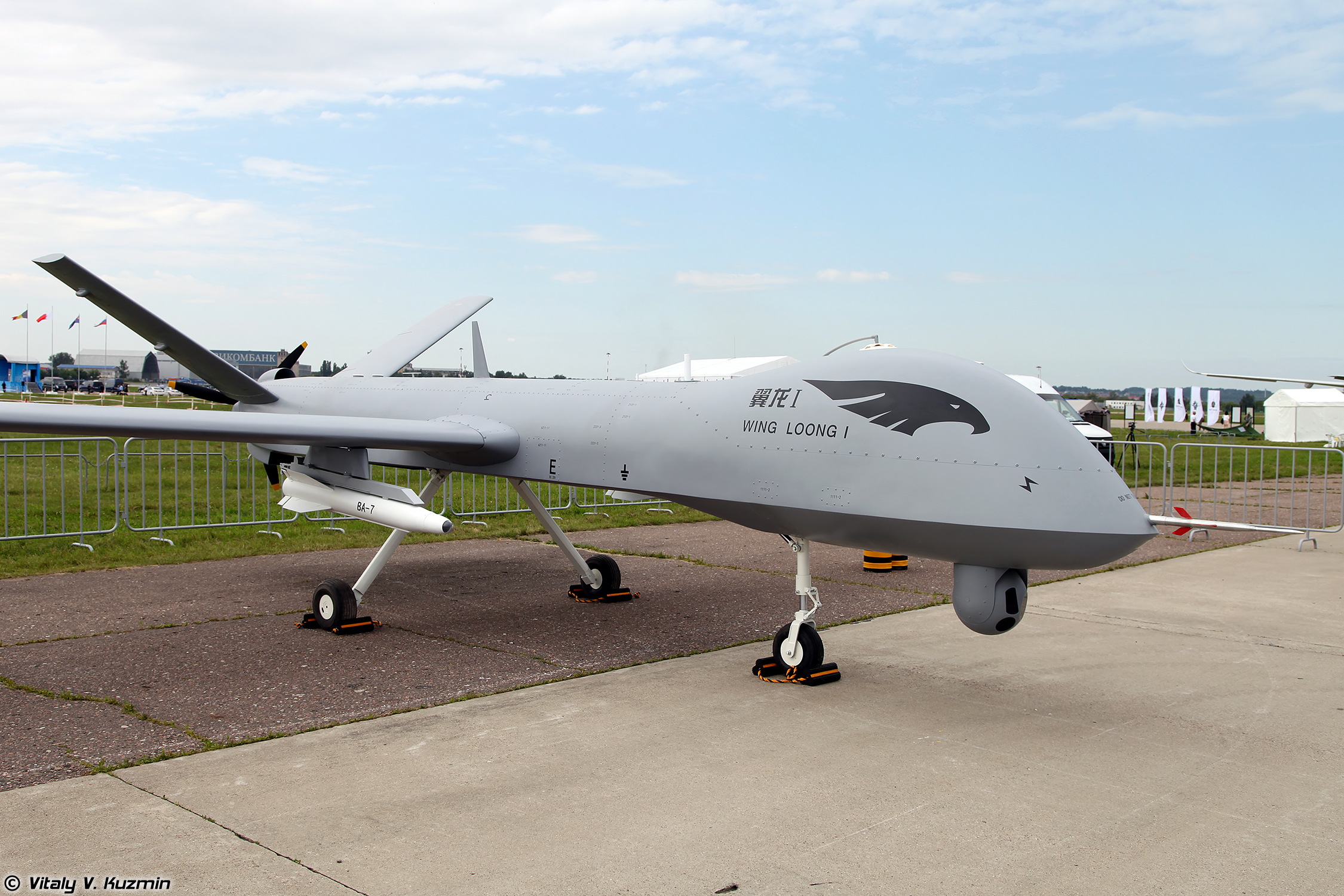
Chinese Wing Loong II UAVs deployed by the UAE to the LNA

Whilst it is known to a degree what equipment the Libyan National Army uses, the exact numbers of the below equipment currently in use is not known. What is certain is that a reasonable quantity of their equipment probably came from ransacked stocks of the original Libyan Army and from defectors as well. A significant amount of arms and equipment possessed by the LNA were majorly shipped by the United Arab Emirates and Russia.

Having an airbase in Libya (Al-Khadim), the UAE constantly breached the UN arms embargo to transfer arms to the Haftar forces. An Emirati firm, Lancaster-6 was involved in transferring three Super Pumas to the LNA in June 2019. The helicopters were believed to be inoperable. The three helicopters remained inside hangars until Haftar's military parade in May 2021 and were expected to take part in his air force.

=== Small arms ===
Name	Image	Country of origin	Type	Caliber	Details
AK-47		Soviet Union	Assault rifle	7.62×39mm	
AKM		Soviet Union	Assault rifle	7.62×39mm	
AK-103		Russia	Assault rifle	7.62×39mm	
AR-M1		Bulgaria	Assault rifle	5.56×45mm NATO; 7.62×39mm	Supplied by the UAE.
Type 56		China	Assault rifle	7.62×39mm	Type 56-1 rifles supplied by the UAE.
Heckler & Koch G36		Germany	Assault rifle	5.56×45mm NATO	
MAT-49		France	Submachine gun	9×19mm Parabellum	
FN P90		Belgium	Submachine gun	FN 5.7×28mm	
SVD		Soviet Union	Designated marksman rifle	7.62×54mmR	
RPD machine gun		Soviet Union	Light machine gun	7.62×39mm	
RPK machine gun		Soviet Union	Light machine gun	7.62×39mm	
PKM		Soviet Union	General-purpose machine gun	7.62×54mmR	
Type 80		China	General-purpose machine gun	7.62×54mmR	Supplied by the UAE.
DShK		Soviet Union	Heavy machine gun	12.7×108mm	
W85		China	Heavy machine gun	12.7×108mm	Supplied by the UAE.
SPG-9		Soviet Union	Recoilless rifle	73mm	Supplied by Jordan.
Carl Gustaf		Sweden	Recoilless rifle	84mm	
M40A1		United States	Recoilless rifle	105mm	
RPG-7		Soviet Union	Rocket-propelled grenade	40mm	
Type 69 RPG		China	Rocket-propelled grenade	40mm	Supplied by the UAE.
RPG-32		Russia; Jordan	Rocket-propelled grenade	105mm	RPG-32 Nashshab supplied by Jordan.
9M14 Malyutka		Soviet Union	Anti-tank guided missile	125mm	
9K111 Fagot		Soviet Union	Anti-tank guided missile	120mm	
9M113 Konkurs		Soviet Union	Anti-tank guided missile	135mm	
9M133 Kornet		Russia	Anti-tank guided missile	152mm	Supplied by the UAE. Some Iranian-made copies are also used.
MILAN		France; Germany	Anti-tank guided missile	115mm	
FGM-148 Javelin		United States	Anti-tank guided missile	127mm	Transferred from France.

=== Main battle tanks ===
Model	Image	Origin	Variant	Details
T-54/T-55		Soviet Union; Egypt	T-55A; T-55E	Supplied by Egypt.
T-62		Soviet Union; Russia	T-62M; T-62MV	T-62M and T-62MV supplied by Russia.
T-72		Soviet Union	T-72; T-72M1	Some were upgraded by General Dynamics UK prior to the 2011 Libyan revolution.
Haider (tank)		Pakistan	44	was bought along with aircraft in 2025.

=== Armored fighting vehicles ===
Model	Image	Origin	Type	Variant	Details
BMP-1		Soviet Union	Infantry fighting vehicle		
BMP-3		Russia	Infantry fighting vehicle		10 delivered in 2013.
Ratel IFV		South Africa	Infantry fighting vehicle	Ratel 20; Ratel 60	1 Ratel 60 was captured by the GNA at Tarhuna.
BRDM-2		Soviet Union; Ukraine	Armored car		Some were supplied by the UAE.
EE-9 Cascavel		Brazil	Armored car		
M113		United States	Tracked armored personnel carrier		
MT-LB		Soviet Union	Command vehicle	MT-LBu	
BTR-60		Soviet Union	Wheeled armored personnel carrier	BTR-60PB	
KADDB Al Mared		Jordan	Wheeled armored personnel carrier		Supplied by Jordan.
Mbombe 6		South Africa	Wheeled armored personnel carrier		Supplied by Jordan.
Nimr		United Arab Emirates	Wheeled armored personnel carrier	Jais N35 4x4 Nimr II	Delivered in 2013.
Puma		Italy	Wheeled armored personnel carrier	6x6	20 donated by Italy.
BAE Caiman		United States	MRAP		Supplied by the UAE.
INKAS Titan		United Arab Emirates	MRAP	Titan-S 4x4 Titan-S 6x6 Titan-DS	Supplied by the UAE.
STREIT Group Typhoon		United Arab Emirates	MRAP		50 donated by the UAE.
BMC Vuran		Turkey	MRAP		Captured from GNA forces.
HMMWV		United States	Infantry mobility vehicle		200 donated by the US in 2012.
KADDB Al Wahsh		Jordan	Infantry mobility vehicle		Supplied by Jordan.
STREIT Group Cougar		United Arab Emirates	Infantry mobility vehicle		Supplied by the UAE.
KrAZ Cobra		United Arab Emirates / Ukraine	Infantry mobility vehicle		Supplied by the UAE.
STREIT Group Spartan		United Arab Emirates	Infantry mobility vehicle		750 donated by the UAE.
Panthera T6		United Arab Emirates	Infantry mobility vehicle		Supplied by the UAE.
Panthera F9		United Arab Emirates; Turkey	Infantry mobility vehicle		Supplied by the UAE.
Igirigi APC		Nigeria	Infantry mobility vehicle	Mk II	Supplied by the UAE.
TAG Terrier LT-79		United States	Infantry mobility vehicle		Supplied by the UAE.
TAG BATT AP		United States	Infantry mobility vehicle		Supplied by the UAE.
GAZ Tigr		Russia	Infantry mobility vehicle	Tigr-M	4 were transferred from the Wagner Group to the LNA.

=== Artillery ===
Name	Image	Country of origin	Type	Caliber	Details
2S1 Gvozdika		Soviet Union	Self-propelled gun	122mm	
D-30		Soviet Union	Towed howitzer	122mm	
M-30		Soviet Union	Towed howitzer	122mm	Supplied by Russia.
G5 howitzer		South Africa	Towed howitzer	155mm	Supplied by the UAE.
Type 63		China; Sudan	Towed multiple rocket launcher	107mm	Sudanese-made launchers are also used.
LRSVM Morava		Serbia	Self-propelled multiple rocket launcher	107mm 122mm	Supplied by the UAE.
BM-21 Grad		Soviet Union	Self-propelled multiple rocket launcher	122mm	
M1989		North Korea; United Arab Emirates	Self-propelled multiple rocket launcher	122mm	240mm rocket launcher modified to fire 122mm rockets.
Scud-B		Soviet Union	Tactical ballistic missile		
9K720 Iskander		Russia	Ballistic missile		
M106 mortar carrier		United States	Mortar carrier	107mm	
Boragh		Iran	Mortar carrier	120mm	Supplied by Sudan.
Type 31		China	Infantry mortar	60mm	Supplied by the UAE.
82-BM-37		Soviet Union	Infantry mortar	82mm	Some were supplied by Russia.
120-PM-43 mortar		Soviet Union	Towed mortar	120mm	Some were supplied by Russia.

=== Air defense ===
Name	Image	Country of origin	Type	Caliber	Details
S-125		Soviet Union; Belarus	Short-range surface-to-air missile		Supplied by the UAE.
9K31 Strela-1		Soviet Union	Short-range surface-to-air missile		
2K12 Kub		Soviet Union	Medium range surface-to-air missile		
Pantsir-S1		Russia	Medium range SAM and SPAAG	30mm	Supplied by the UAE.
9K338 Igla-S		Soviet Union; Russia	Man-portable air-defense system	72mm	
ZPU-2		Soviet Union	Anti-aircraft gun	14.5×114mm	Mounted on technicals.
ZU-23-2		Soviet Union; Polish People's Republic	Anti-aircraft gun	23x152mmB	Mounted on technicals. Some Polish-made guns were supplied by the UAE.
ZSU-23-4		Soviet Union	Self-propelled anti-aircraft gun	23x152mmB	
S-400 missile system		Russia			6

=== Utility vehicles and trucks ===
Name	Image	Country of origin	Type	Model	Details
Toyota Land Cruiser		Japan	Utility vehicle	HZJ-79	Used as technicals.
Jeep J8		United States	Light utility vehicle		Supplied by Egypt.
Fath Safir		Iran	Light utility vehicle		Supplied by Sudan.
KAMAZ		Russia	Medium truck	6x6	
Iveco Trakker		Italy	Heavy truck (10 tonnes)	Trakker 380	

== See also ==
- National Liberation Army
