= Petroleum Facilities Guard =

Libyan oil company and militia

- حرس المنشآت النفطية
- Leaders: Idris Bukhamada (August 2013 – 2014) Ibrahim Jadhran (2014 – February 2017) Idris Bukhamada (February 2017 – Present)
- Spokesperson: Ali al-Hassi
- Dates active: October 2012 – Present
- Headquarters: Brega
- Active regions: Libya
- Ideology: Federalism
- Size: 17,000 – 35,000
- Wars: the Second Libyan Civil War
- Website: http://www.pfglibya.org/

The Petroleum Facilities Guard (PFG; Arabic: حرس المنشآت النفطية) is a Libyan oil company and militia led by Idris Bukhamada. Established in October 2012, it took control of the main oil export terminals in eastern Libya in the summer of 2013 and starting in March 2014 attempted to sell oil. In 2014, Ibrahim Jadhran ousted Idris Bukhamada, and became the new leader of the PFG. Despite initially allying himself with Khalifa Haftar, this alliance would later sour and lead to Jadhran accusing the LNA of trying to assassinate him in September 2015.

During the Battle of Sirte (2016), the PFG joined the Government of National Accord-led offensive against the Islamic State of Iraq and the Levant, taking control of Bin Jawad and Nawfiliyah on 27 May.

After controlling the ports for years and costing Libya over 60 billion dollars of oil revenues, the Libyan National Army launched Operation Surprise Lightning on 10 September 2016 in a bid to take the PFG-controlled Brega, Zuwetina, Sidra and Ras Lanouf oil terminals. The next day, local activists reported that Libyan National Army's 166th Battalion managed to capture the town of Ajdabiya, Sadra, and Ras Lanouf after a fierce battle with the PFG forces in western Benghazi. By the 12th of September, the LNA had captured the headquarters of the Zueitina oil terminal, leaving the PFG with hardly any territory under its control. On the 14th, the LNA seized Brega, prompting LNA Colonel Muftah al-Muqarief to declare victory, being quoted as saying "The entire oil crescent region is now under our control".

Later in September, the PFG launched an abortive attempt to retake the Gulf of Sidra, Before being driven back with 5 PFG members killed and several vehicles destroyed.

On 6–7 December 2016, the PFG, allied with the Benghazi Defense Brigades, launched another attempt to retake the Gulf of Sidra, Briefly seizing Nofaliya and Bin Jawad before being driven back by an LNA counterattack and retreating toward Harawa. The LNA followed up their victory with a retaliation raid in the vicinity of Al Jufrah air base, killing field commander Umar Al Mukhtar and wounding 13, as well as advancing on Gate 50 east of Sirte with the 21st and 101st Infantry Battalions, and seizing the Brak Al Shati air base and Tamanhint air base in Sabha region with the 12th Brigade led by Mohammed Ben Nayel.

In February 2017, Ibrahim Jadhran was sacked by the presidency council as leader of the PFG, and Idris Bukhamada was appointed as the new leader.

By July 2019, the PFG, now under the command of Naji al-Maghrabi, had once again aligned itself with the LNA.
