= Mohammad al-Bargathi =

Libyan politician

Mohammad al-Bargathi (Arabic: محمد البرغثي) was the defence minister of Libya from December 2012 to 7 May 2013. He offered to resign in May 2013 after failing to bring militias under control, and was sacked by the PM Ali Zeidan in June He was replaced by Abdullah al-Thanay. Previously, he was commander of the air force in Benghazi before retiring on a government pension in 1994 and defected from Gaddafi's government in the 1980s after serving as Libya's ambassador to India.
