= Zuwarah Airport =

Zuwarah Airport Zwara
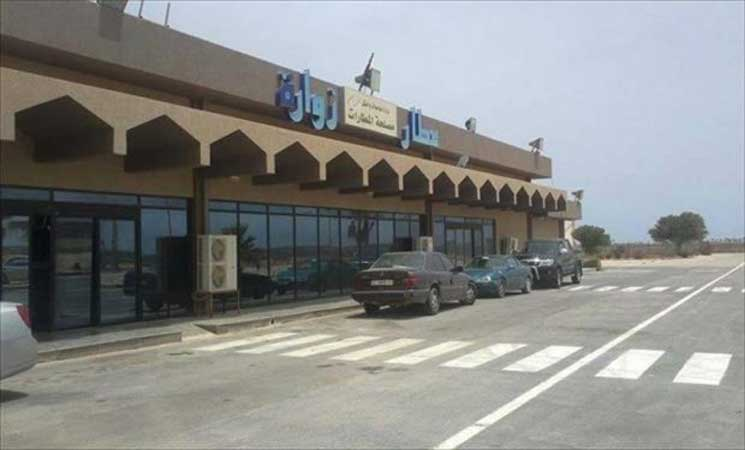
- IATA: WAX; ICAO: HLZW

Summary
- Airport type: Public
- Serves: Zuwarah
- Elevation AMSL: 9 ft / 3 m
- Coordinates: 32°57′10″N 12°01′00″E

Map
- Location of the airport in Libya

Runways
Direction	Length		Surface
Direction	m	ft	Surface
06/24	1,800	5,906	Asphalt
- Source: Google Maps GCM

Zuwarah Airport (IATA: WAX, ICAO: HLZW) is an airport serving the Mediterranean coastal city of Zuwarah in Libya. The airport is 4 kilometres (2.5 mi) west of the city.

The Zawia VOR-DME (Ident: ZAW) is located 33.5 nautical miles (62.0 km) east-southeast of the airport. The Zwara non-directional beacon (Ident: ZAR) is located on the field.

== See also ==
- Transport in Libya
- List of airports in Libya
