= 2020 Al-Watiya airstrike =

- Part of the Second Libyan Civil War
- Type: Air strike
- Location: Al-Watiya Air Base, Libya
- Target: GNA military equipment
- Date: 4 July 2020
- Executed by: United Arab Emirates (alleged); Egypt (alleged)
- Casualties: MIM-23 Hawk system destroyed

On 4 July 2020, Unidentified aircraft launched airstrikes on Al-Watiya Air Base in the desert southwest of Tripoli, destroying military equipment, including anti-air defences, sent from Turkey to the Government of National Accord (GNA).

== Airstrike ==
This attack destroyed the MIM-23 Hawk air defence systems and the Koral system just two days after Turkey deployed them in the air base. The airstrike hit at least nine targets at the base. Al-Arabiyah reported injured Turkish officials and 3 radars destroyed. Libyan Newspaper Libya Akhbar cited 6 Turkish servicemen killed. Turkey remained a major supporter of the GNA, supplying drones and deploying thousands of Syrian mercenaries, including militants affiliated with Al-Qaeda and the Islamic State. Turkish officials condemned the airstrikes and claimed that the strikes didn't cause any casualties but vowed "retribution". One Turkish official said the aircraft were likely to be Dassault Mirage fighters belonging to the United Arab Emirates. Egyptian president Abdel Fattah el-Sisi said Egypt "will not allow the conflict in Libya to cross the Sirte line" and that "with regard to Egypt’s security, al-Jufra is a red line that we will not allow any force to cross".
