= Libyan Special Forces =

Elite Libyan National Army unit

- Official emblem of Libyan Special Forces
- Founder: Abdel Fatah Younis
- Leaders: Wanis Bukhamada (until 2020); Abdul Salam Al-Hassi (since 2020)
- Dates active: 1970 – present
- Headquarters: Benghazi
- Active regions: Benghazi
- Size: Up to 5,000 soldiers
- Part of: Libyan National Army
- Wars: Libyan Civil War (2011) and Factional violence in Libya (2011–2014)

The Libyan Special Forces (LSF) (Arabic: القوات الخاصة الليبية), also known as the Al-Saiqa or Saiqa Special Forces and simply Saiqa or Al-Saiqa (Arabic: الصاعقة; English: lightning, thunderbolt), are an elite Libyan National Army unit formed from a mixture of paratroopers, paramilitary forces and commandos. (They should not be confused with the similarly named Lightning Bolt Brigade (Sawaiq Brigade) which is part of the Zintan Brigades.) Prominent LSF commander Mahmoud al-Werfalli was indicted in 2017 and 2018 by the International Criminal Court for the war crime of murdering and ordering the murders of non-combatants, and was assassinated in 2021.

== Origins and early history ==
Al-Saiqa was established in 1970 in Benghazi by then-Lieutenant Abdel Fattah Younis, who issued the founding decree. Egyptian military trainers were brought in to help stand up and train the force. A Commando and Parachute School (مدرسة الصاعقة والمظلات) was set up alongside it, and began producing the unit's first cadres of special forces personnel. The unit grew into a formation with battalions stationed across Libya, including in Tripoli, Derna, Misrata and Sabha, and maintained its headquarters and main training facilities in Benghazi..

Al-Saiqa trained personnel from other branches of the Libyan armed forces in commando, parachute, special operations and VIP protection courses. During the Chadian–Libyan conflict in the 1980s, Al-Saiqa personnel served in Chad. Wanis Bukhamada, who later commanded the unit, enlisted in 1980 at the age of twenty and was sent to northern Chad during the war. In the 1990s, Al-Saiqa was used to suppress the insurgency of the Libyan Islamic Fighting Group (LIFG) in eastern Libya.

In the later years of Muammar Gaddafi's rule, the regular armed forces were deliberately weakened. Following repeated coup attempts, Gaddafi created parallel security brigades from 1979 onwards that received preferential funding and equipment, while regular army units like Al-Saiqa were neglected. Al Arabiya described the unit as having been left dormant until Abdel Fattah Younis revived it upon his defection during the 2011 uprising.

== 2011 Uprising ==
During the 2011 Libyan Civil War, the LSF defected from the government of Muammar Gaddafi to protect civilian protesters. The unit aligned with the National Transitional Council (NTC), playing a critical role in the defense of Benghazi and holding off loyalist forces advancing from the west.

== Composition and hierarchy ==
During the 2011 uprising, the entire Al-Saiqa force in Benghazi defected to the opposition on 19 February 2011, following Major General Abdel Fattah Younis, who had established the unit by decree in 1970. The next day, Al-Saiqa attacked the Gaddafi-aligned Fadil Bu Amr brigade in Benghazi and seized its headquarters, one of the first military operations carried out in the name of the February Revolution. Younis was named commander-in-chief of the rebel armed forces and assassinated in July 2011.

Major General Wanis al-Mabrouk Bukhamada took command of Al-Saiqa after Younis's death. By late 2012, Al-Saiqa reported to the Ministry of Defence on paper and numbered "a few thousand" personnel. In practice, the central government gave Al-Saiqa little support while funding rival militia umbrellas such as the Libya Shield Force. This neglect was one reason Bukhamada sided with Khalifa Haftar's Operation Dignity in 2014.

From 2013, Al-Saiqa was engaged in fighting against Islamist militant groups in Benghazi, most notably Ansar al-Sharia, which was later designated a terrorist organisation by the United Nations and the United States. As the security situation deteriorated and assassinations of military and police officers increased, Bukhamada called on civilians to bolster Al-Saiqa's ranks; around 800 volunteered, joining the unit's 300 professional soldiers. By early 2014, international security reports put the unit's overall strength at "several thousand," but it lacked equipment and logistical support. Losses were heavy: between 21 and 30 July 2014 alone, a senior Al-Saiqa official reported 63 dead and 200 wounded. Elements of Ansar al-Sharia and other militant factions in Benghazi went on to pledge allegiance to the Islamic State of Iraq and the Levant (ISIL) from late 2014 onwards, with the group's senior sharia official defecting to ISIL in March 2015. Al-Saiqa continued to fight these groups as part of the Libyan Arab Armed Forces (LAAF) until the LAAF secured control of Benghazi.

Bukhamada died in November 2020. Field Marshal Khalifa Haftar appointed Major General Abdul Salam Al-Hassi, a career officer within Al-Saiqa who had previously led its operations room during the Tripoli offensive, to replace him. Under Al-Hassi's command, Al-Saiqa reopened and rehabilitated facilities including the Battalion 302 training centre in Ganfouda and resumed formal cadet training, graduating new classes of recruits through the LAAF structure.

Mahmoud al-Werfalli joined Al-Saiqa after the fall of the Gaddafi regime and held a commanding role from at least December 2015. By August 2017, his title was Axes Commander and he was responsible for at least one detention centre. The International Criminal Court (ICC) indicted him in August 2017 and again in July 2018 for the war crime of murder and ordering murder under Article 8(2)(c)(i) of the Rome Statute. Both warrants remained outstanding until al-Werfalli was shot dead in Benghazi on 24 March 2021. The ICC terminated proceedings against him in June 2022.

=== Benghazi clashes and Operation Dignity ===
Following the fall of the Gaddafi government, the period between 2012 and 2014 saw escalating tensions in Benghazi between regular army elements, including Al-Saiqa, and Islamist militias such as Ansar al-Sharia, which was designated a terrorist organisation by the United Nations, the United States, the United Kingdom, Turkey and the United Arab Emirates. Al-Saiqa was deployed in Benghazi in the summer of 2013 to control the growing disorder and was popular among residents for its stance against the militant groups. This position led to targeted assassinations of its officers and friction with government-sanctioned militias like the Libya Shield Force.

Between November and December 2013, Al-Saiqa fought Ansar al-Sharia directly, suffering losses in the process. The conflict intensified as militant factions formed the Shura Council of Benghazi Revolutionaries (BRSC), an alliance that included Ansar al-Sharia and other armed groups opposed to the regular army. Elements of these factions later pledged allegiance to the Islamic State of Iraq and the Levant (ISIL), with Ansar al-Sharia's senior sharia official defecting to ISIL in March 2015 and many of the group's fighters following.

At the end of July 2014, BRSC fighters overran Al-Saiqa's main base in Benghazi's Buatni district, including Camp 36 and the special forces school. A senior Al-Saiqa official reported losses of 63 dead and 200 wounded between 21 and 30 July. By 13 August 2014, Al-Saiqa had fallen back to Benina International Airport, the base of Operation Dignity's helicopter unit.

Al-Saiqa's defence at Benina coincided with the formal endorsement of Operation Dignity (Karama) by the House of Representatives, which gave Khalifa Haftar an official military role. With Al-Saiqa integrated into the broader Libyan Arab Armed Forces (LAAF) structure, the unit launched a counter-offensive and fought through heavily contested districts of Benghazi including Al Laithi and Buatni. In July 2017, Haftar declared the "liberation" of Benghazi, although fighting in the downtown area of Sidi Khreibish continued until early 2018. The LAAF reported more than 5,000 casualties across its forces during the three-year campaign.

== Related voices ==
- Libyan National Army
- Benghazi
