= Sidra, Libya =

Sidra السدرة
- Town
- Location in Libya
- Coordinates: 30°37′46″N 18°21′01″E
- Country: Libya
- Region: Tripolitania
- District: Sirte
- Elevation: 10 m (33 ft)

Population (1995)
  - Total: 9,186
- Time zone: UTC+2 (EET)

Sidra or Sidr (Arabic: السدرة) is a port about 23 km west of Ra's Lanuf in Libya. It is Libya's largest oil depot, shipping about 447,000 barrels per day (71,100 m^{3}/d), and during the Cold War gave its name to the 'Gulf of Sidra', an alternative name for the Gulf of Sirte. Sidra Airport is located directly next to the port.

== History ==
This oil port increased in importance as Libya's economy developed in the last quarter of the 20th century.

=== Libyan Civil War ===
During the Libyan Civil War, the National Transitional Council forces captured the port of Sidra at the beginning of March 2011. Pro-Gaddafi forces tried to retake the port some days later.

=== Second Libyan Civil War ===
During the Second Libyan Civil War, the Islamic State of Iraq and the Levant's Libyan branch launched an attempt to seize the port in January 2016. At least one oil storage tank was set ablaze after being hit by a long-range rocket.

In June 2018, militiamen led by Ibrahim Jadhran seized the port from the Libyan National Army. The LNA recaptured the port on 21 June.

In January 2020, the National Oil Corporation declared force majuere over oil loadings at the port after a blockade was imposed by tribes affiliated with the Libyan National Army of Khalifa Haftar.

In July 2020, the National Oil Corporation reported that Wagner Group, Janjaweed and Syrian mercenaries were present at the port.
