= Yousef Mangoush =

Libyan major general

- Born: 1950 (age 75–76); Benghazi, Cyrenaica, Libya
- Military career
- Allegiance: Libyan Arab Jamahiriya (until 1999); Libya (2011-)
- Branch: Libyan Ground Forces
- Service years: ?-1999; 2011-present
- Rank: Major General
- Unit: Artillery
- Conflicts: Chadian–Libyan conflict Libyan Civil War: Third Battle of Brega

Yousef Mangoush, born in Benghazi, Cyrenaica, Libya, in 1950, is a major general. He was named as the Chief of Staff of the Libyan Ground Forces on 2 January 2012, Mangoush served in the Libyan army under the Muammar Gaddafi government and retired in 1999 at the rank of Colonel. He had been a special forces commander in the Libyan Army prior to his retirement.

Mangush was the deputy defense minister in the interim government of Prime Minister Abdurrahim El-Keib.

Mangoush joined the rebel forces in February 2011 during the Libyan conflict which toppled Muammar Gaddafi, Mangush was arrested in the oil town of Brega in April by Gaddafi's forces and freed in late August following the fall of Tripoli.
