= Factional violence in Libya (2011–2014) =

Period following the overthrow of Gaddafi

- Part of the Libyan crisis and the Aftermath of the Libyan civil war (2011)
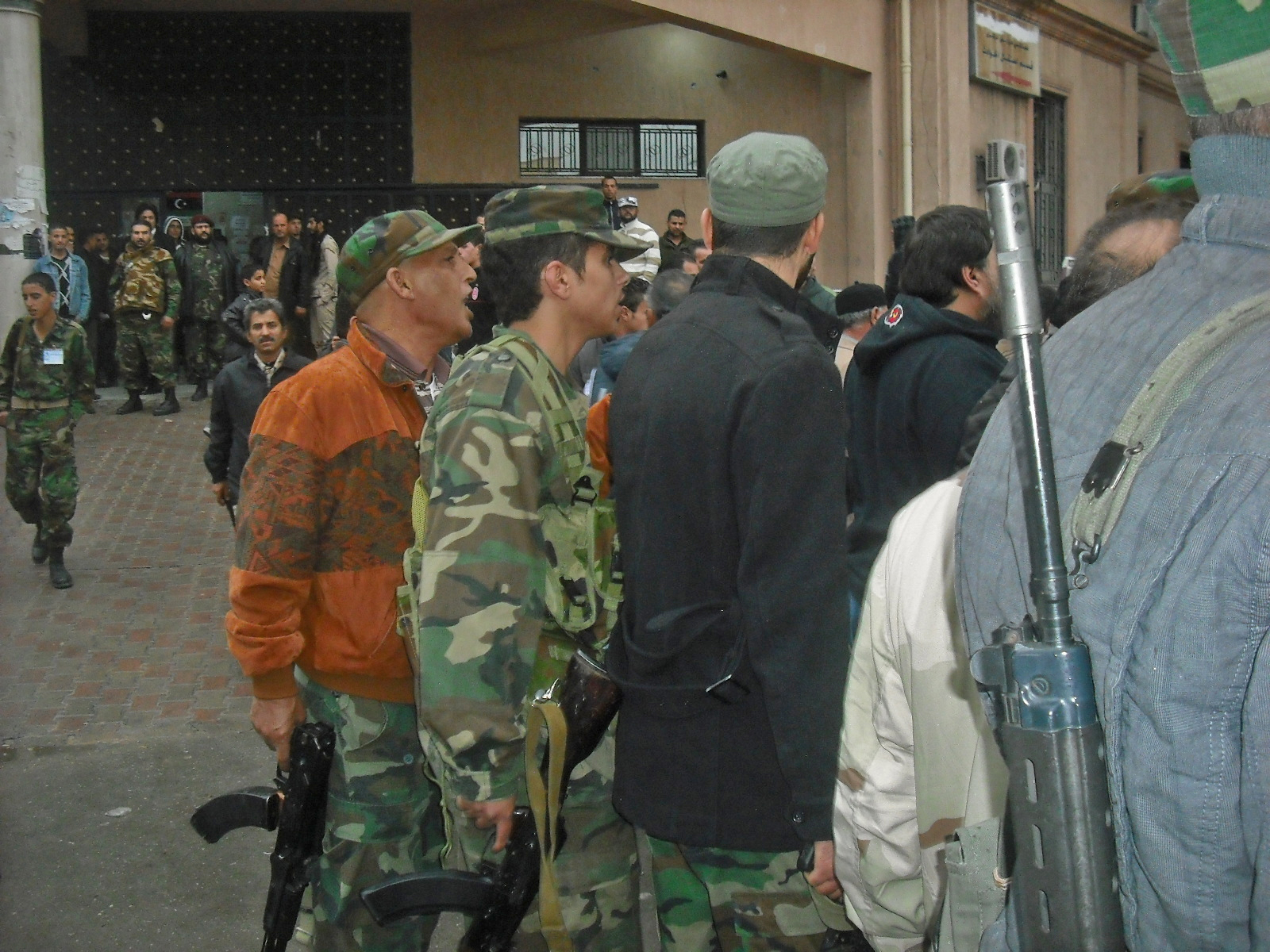
- Militiamen in the streets of Tripoli after skirmishes, January 2012. Since the end of the First Libyan Civil War, armed militias had clashed throughout the country.
Date	1 November 2011 – 16 May 2014 (2 years, 6 months, 2 weeks and 1 day)
Location	Libya
Result	Outbreak of the Second Libyan Civil War: Warfalla militias briefly seize control of Bani Walid; Bani Walid is retaken by government forces by November 2012; Omran Shaban the man most held for the extrajudicial killing of Gaddafi died violently from injuries he received from Gaddafi loyalists in Bani Walid; Attacks on foreign diplomatic missions in Benghazi and Tripoli by Islamist militias; Several militias disbanded and routed by the government in western Libya.; Kidnapping of Libyan Prime Minister (October 2013); Militias remain armed in eastern Libya.; Two coup attempts by General Khalifa Haftar in 2014 (2014 Libyan coup d'état attempt); Large scale collapse of government and threat of new civil war.; Tripoli International Airport captured by Islamist militias

Belligerents
(Libya) Libyan National Army; Special Forces (Saiqa brigade); Libyan Air Force; Libyan Navy; Government-sanctioned local militias: Supreme Security Committee	Various militias: (Libya) Gaddafi loyalists; Brigade 93; Toubou Front for the Salvation of Libya; (Libya) General Haftar forces: Zintan Brigade; Pro Haftar Libyan National Army factions; Mashashya tribe (alleged); Katibat Al-Awfiyah brigade; Al-Awfea brigade (alleged)	Shura Council of Benghazi Revolutionaries: Ansar Al-Sharia Brigades; Libya Shield 1

Commanders and leaders
(Libya) Col. Wanis Bukhamada (Special Forces and Benghazi commander)	(Libya) Col. Salem Al-waer (Libya) Saif al-Islam Gaddafi (Libya) Gen. Khalifa Haftar	Salim Derby †; Mohamed Ali al-Zahawi †; Ahmed Abu Khattala (POW)
- 942–1,096 killed in 2011–2012; 233 killed in 2014

Following the end of the First Libyan Civil War, which overthrew Muammar Gaddafi, there was violence involving various militias and the new state security forces. This violence escalated into the Second Libyan Civil War (2014–2020).

The militias included guerrillas, Islamists, and militias who fought against Gaddafi but refused to lay down their arms when the war ended in October 2011. According to some civilian leaders, these latter militias shifted from merely delaying the surrender of their weapons to actively asserting a continuing political role as "guardians of the revolution". Some of the largest, and most well-equipped militias were associated with Islamist groups that were forming political parties. Before the official end of hostilities between loyalist and opposition forces, there were reports of sporadic clashes between rival militias, and vigilante revenge killings.

In September 2012, Islamists attacked the United States consulate building in Benghazi, killing the US ambassador and three others. This prompted a popular outcry against semi-legal militias that were still operating and resulted in the storming of several Islamist militia bases by protesters. A large-scale government crackdown followed on non-government sanctioned militias, with the Libyan Army raiding several now illegal militias' headquarters and ordering them to disband.

== Events ==
=== 2011 ===
==== November 2011 ====
On 1 November, a group of intoxicated Zintan fighters stormed a hospital in Tripoli and demanded they hand-over of a fighter who was wounded earlier in the day in a clash that also left another militiaman dead. The doctors refused and a Tripoli militia, in charge of hospital security, forced the Zintanis out, but not before they shot rounds in the hospital. Both groups received reinforcements and the fighting, involving heavy machine guns and anti-aircraft guns, lasted for three hours. There were no direct fatalities from the fighting, but three patients at the hospital died due to stress-related causes linked to the clashes. Three Tripoli fighters were wounded. The fighting reportedly ended after calls from a local imam and senior commanders from both groups talked by phone with their men.

On 8 November, it was evident that loyalist remnants were also still active in the country, even more than two weeks after their defeat, when a pro-Gaddafi convoy tried to cross the border into Niger and was intercepted by the Nigerien army. 13 loyalists and one Nigerien soldier were killed.

Between 8 and 12 November, large-scale fighting erupted between Zawiya and Tripoli between a Zawiya-based militia and a group from the Wershifanna tribe. The Zawiya group accused their opponents of belonging to loyalist remnants and they reported seeing tanks and vehicles with the Gaddafi-era green flag and markings that said "Brigade of the Martyr Muammar Gaddafi". The Wershifanna denied this and stated that the men from Zawiya had been misled by a rumor that pro-Gaddafi fighters were in the area. The fighting was centered around the former loyalist Imaya military base and both sides vied for control. Grad rocket launchers were used at times during the clashes. 9–12 Zawiya fighters and nine Wershifanna fighters were killed.

On 23 November, a militia force in Bani Walid was ambushed after being sent there to arrest a known Gaddafi supporter. 15 militia members were killed. The survivors reported being shot at and hit with grenades and rockets from houses after they found out all the roads were blocked. Another report stated that the fighting started after a high-speed chase with a suspect vehicle in which a Gaddafi loyalist was killed. One civilian also reportedly died during the fighting.

==== December 2011 ====
In early December, a group of Zintani gunmen attacked the convoy of a top army officer, General Khalifa Haftar, as it was speeding through a checkpoint set up by the group. In a separate incident, gunfire broke out between the army and the Zintan brigade at the Tripoli International Airport. On 16 December, Haftar said an armed group had abducted his son, Belgassim, and detained him at the airport.

On 6 December, Libya's interim government announced that, following consultations with Tripoli's local council, it had given militias lingering in the capital until late December to hand over security to the authorities. Officials said residents of Tripoli would convene rallies in support of the initiative to clear the city of weapons and out-of-town fighters. If militias had not withdrawn by 20 December, the authorities and members of the public intended to close the whole city to traffic. By January 2012, the former rebels had dismantled most of their checkpoints, while some key bases still remained.

On 11 December, fighting erupted south of Zintan, between the Zintan militia and members of the El-Mashasha tribe. The clashes started when the El-Mashasha attacked the convoy of a Zintan militia commander, killing him, as he tried to pass through the town of Wamis, around which the tribe was based. The Zintanis retaliated by attacking the town with artillery or rocket fire, hitting houses in residential areas. A mosque and a school were also hit. Over two days of fighting three townspeople were killed. By 13 December, a ceasefire was established. Officials from Zintan stated that the fighting was the result of the El-Mashasha killing several residents of Zintan earlier in week.

=== 2012 ===
==== January 2012 ====
On 3 January, four fighters were killed in a gun battle in Tripoli as dozens of fighters from Misrata were trying to seize a group of prisoners being held in a security compound by Tripoli militias. Another report stated that there were two separate gun battles and put the number of dead at seven. In response to the incident, NTC chairman Mustafa Abdul Jalil warned that Libya risked sliding into civil war if the rival militias were not brought under control.

On 14 January, two fighters were killed and 36 were injured after clashes between militias from neighbouring towns of Gharyan and Asbi'a. It was reported that artillery and rockets were used during the clashes. On 15 January, the rival groups carried out a prisoner swap and agreed to a ceasefire. Officials said 12 people had been killed and around 100 wounded on both sides. In the days leading up to the fighting, the Asbi'a commander assigned to Gharyan, Ezzedine al-Ghool, was detained and tortured to death by members of the Gharyan militia. His body was dropped off anonymously at a hospital in Tripoli.

On 20 January, Libya's former ambassador to France died less than a day after he was arrested by a Tripoli militia group. Human Rights Watch said on 3 February, that marks on Omar Brebesh's body suggested he died as a result of torture while he was in detention.

On 22 January, a new clash broke out in Tripoli when NTC fighters attempted to arrest a former prisoner, charged with murder, who was released by the Gaddafi government at the start of the civil war the previous year. He and his brother took shelter in their home and opened fire on the militia with RPGs and automatic weapons. Both brothers and an NTC fighter were killed and five militiamen were wounded.

On 26 January, the humanitarian aid non-governmental organization Médecins Sans Frontières (which had been present in Misrata since April 2011, during the Libyan Civil War) announced the suspension of their work in the city detention centres, as detainees were tortured and denied urgent health care. MSF General Director Christopher Stokes stated: "Patients were brought to us in the middle of interrogation for medical care, in order to make them fit for more interrogation. This is unacceptable. Our role is to provide medical care to war casualties and sick detainees, not to repeatedly treat the same patients between torture sessions.". Amnesty International had described two days ago "widespread torture and ill-treatment of suspected pro-Gadhafi fighters and loyalists.", with several detainees dying across Libya in the precedent weeks.

Bani Walid clashes

Uprising started in Bani Walid on 23 January 2012 due to an incident in the city of Bani Walid in which the "May 28 Brigade" militia wished to arrest local men in unclear circumstances. The May 28 Brigade and their compound were then attacked by local fighters who then took control of the town.

==== February 2012 ====
On 6 February, seven male black Libyan civilians from Tawergha were killed by militias who raided their makeshift refugee camp at a former naval academy in Janzour, a suburb of Tripoli. The survivors said that they appeared to be from Misrata because of their license plates, though the Misrata militia denied this.

Kufra clashes

On 12 February, conflict erupted between Zuwayya and Toubou tribesmen in southern town of Kufra. This conflict lasted several months and led to government military intervention which started uneasy truce between two tribes.

On 15 February, Amnesty International reported that at least 12 detainees had been tortured to death while in militia custody.

==== March 2012 ====
On 2 March, the head of the security committee in Derna, Colonel Mohammed Al-Hassi, was shot and killed outside a petrol station in the town. He had previously survived two earlier assassination attempts and was also the head of Derna's anti-drugs unit. He cracked down hard on local drug smugglers during and before the civil war.

On 6 March, tribal and militia leaders in Benghazi declared unilaterally semi-autonomy for the eastern region of Cyrenaica. This was met with anger from the NTC government in Tripoli and anti-autonomy demonstrations erupted in the capital and Benghazi. On 16 March, a pro-autonomy demonstration was held in Benghazi, which was attacked by unknown gunmen, leaving one person dead and five injured.

On 18 March, a clash erupted between the Zintan militia and residents of Tripoli's Abu Salim district, previously loyal to Gaddafi. One militiaman was killed before a cease-fire was brokered by the district's own militia commander.

Sabha clashes

Late on 25 March, clashes erupted in the southern city of Sabha, between Arab and Toubou tribesmen, after a man from the Abu Seif tribe was killed in a dispute over a car by the Toubou which lasted for one week.

==== April 2012 ====
Zuwara clashes

On 1 April, 21–34 Zuwara militiamen were detained by members of a neighboring town's militia. The Ragdalein fighters stated that they captured the men after months of abuses by a Zuwara brigade, including the looting of property. For their part, the Zuwara local council head accused Ragdalein to be a hub of Gaddafi loyalists. A third version of the events came from the government Interior Ministry which stated that the trouble started when a Zuwara hunting party near Al-Jumail shot and killed a person from that town by mistake. The hunters were then arrested but released later. Another Zuwara council head claimed that the men were tortured before being released and stated that Zuwara came under mortar and anti-aircraft fire by militias from both Ragdalein and Al-Jumail.

On 3 April, reports emerged that the fighting in the Zuwara area was still continuing with at least one Zuwara militiaman killed and five wounded. The losses for Ragdalein and Al-Jumail were not known. Clashes were reported at the entrance to Ragdalein while Al-Jumail was shelling Zuwara. At least 14 were killed and 80 injured.

On 4 April, the fighting escalated with the use of tanks and artillery. The reported number of dead was said to have risen to 26, eight from Zuwara and 18 from the outlying towns, and another 142 Zuwarans were wounded. Unconfirmed reports rose up the death toll to 48 killed in the clashes.

On 6 April, French leading newspaper Le Figaro reported that a dozen people were killed near Ghat on 1 and 2 April in fighting between former pro-Gaddafi Tuaregs and the Zintan tribe.

On 20 April, fighting restarted in Kufra with 12 people being killed and more than 35 wounded when the Tobu fighters were reportedly attacked by units under the command of the Libyan National Army. The fighting began when a Tobu tribesman was killed by members of the Zuwayya tribe. The battles lasted late into 21 April.

==== May 2012 ====
On 8 May, protests outside prime minister office turned violent when ex-rebels, which protested on the non-payment of the promised cash handout by the government, attacked the office in Tripoli. One Interior Ministry's Supreme Security Committee (SSC) guard was killed, while four others, one protester and three SSC guards, were injured.

On 15 May, a diplomatic source briefed by Western intelligence officials stated that, beside the tribal rivalries plaguing the country, there was concern about a growing presence of Islamist militants in some areas, specifically the city of Derna. The source said that hundreds of Islamist militants were in and around the town, and there were militant training camps where weapons were also provided. He said one official had described the area as "a disaster zone." Tensions had reportedly grown between local people and the militants. According to the source, the previous month, a number of town residents went to a camp on the outskirts of the city and forced militants to leave. One of the indicators of the militant inter-factional were also the recent spate of car-bombings in Derna. One of the attacks targeted Abdel Hakim al Hasadi, a former member of the Libyan Islamic Fighting Group. The same day, two people were killed and a third wounded in intertribal clashes in Sorman.

On 16 May, fighting erupted between Tuareg tribesmen and local militiamen over control of a checkpoint on the edge of Ghadames on a desert route often used for smuggling, near the Algerian border. Between seven and thirteen people were killed and more than 20 wounded. Per one local official, except one person, all of the dead were Tuaregs.

==== June 2012 ====
On 5 June, a militia checkpoint in Gwarsha district was attacked and destroyed by the family of a member of the security forces who had been fatally shot earlier by a militiaman at the checkpoint.

On 6 June, one person was shot and killed in Sirte, purportedly by anti-Gaddafi gunmen who thought the man was a loyalist.

Between 11 and 17 June, clashes raged in the town of Zintan. Zintani militiamen were involved in fighting with members of the El-Mashasha tribe, whom they accuse of being Gaddafi loyalists because they did not join the opposition during the civil war the previous year. The fighting reportedly started when a Zintani militiaman was shot and killed at an El-Mashasha checkpoint. At the same time, a security patrol came under fire in Sabha, leaving two dead and 10 wounded. Armed clashes also flared anew in Kufra, leaving one dead and dozens injured. After days of clashes, on 17 June, the Libyan government declared the area around Zintan a military zone and sent troops to stop the fighting. The total casualty toll for the fighting in the Zintan area was ultimately stated to be 105 killed and more than 500 wounded. The majority of the dead were reported to be El-Mashasha. The tribesmen accused the Zintan forces of shelling their town, Sheguiga, with tank and rocket fire.

==== July 2012 ====
On 6 July, a helicopter carrying election material was shot at south of Benghazi killing an election worker.

On 28 July, Colonel Bouzyreda Sleiman, a former military intelligence agent who defected to the opposition during the civil war, was shot and killed in Benghazi as he was performing the Taraweeh prayers at the Amer Bin Yas mosque. Other former Benghazi interior security officers, as Abdelhamid Kandouz Ali or non-commissioned officer Ibrahim Al-Arabi, were killed several days before by car bombs.

On 29 July, commander of Libyan ground forces Khalifa Hafter escaped an assassination attempt in Benghazi, when his convoy get under fire from unknown assailants. Abdel-Basit Haroun, a Benghazi militia commander, declared that only during the past month thirteen people who had been close to the former government had been killed. Also in Benghazi, a bomb planted at the Tibesti hotel was defused before it could explode.

==== August 2012 ====
On 1 August, clashes in Abu Isa (between Zawiya and Sorman) between armed gangs who were fighting over some vehicles since the day before ended with the intervention of the Libya Shield Force, with a final toll between two and four killed, and five injured.

On 10 August, another former Libyan Army officer who was among the first defecting to the opposition, Brigadier General Mohamed Hadia al-Feitouri, was shot and killed in Benghazi. Hadia, then defence ministry official responsible for ammunition and weapons, was returning home from Friday prayers when a group of gunmen pulled up in a car and opened fire on him.

On 19 August, two people were killed in a two independent car bomb attacks in Tripoli. They are the first fatal bomb attacks since the fall of the Gaddafi regime. The Libyan Ministry of Interior accused Gaddafi loyalists of carrying out the attacks, while those loyalists using an instant messaging service Paltalk were reportedly listening to the Interior Ministry's communications network.

On 23 August, tribal clashes with heavy weapons (between Awlad Al-Shaikh tribesmen and Zlitenis according to some sources, and between Al-Haly and Al-Fawatra tribes according to others) started in Zliten, killing between three and twelve people, and injuring dozens. In a separate development, Interior ministry spokesman Abdelmonem al-Hur stated that more than a hundred tanks and twenty-six rocket launchers were seized from an alleged pro-Gaddafi militia (named Katibat Al-Awfiyah, or Brigade of the Faithful), during a raid on their campsite in Tarhuna. The operation ended with one of the suspects killed, eight wounded and thirteen detainees, accused of being linked with the 19 August Tripoli bombings. In Homs, east of Tripoli, a women's hunger strike over conditions at a migrants camp was suppressed by anti-Gaddafi militia members, leaving three Sub-Saharan migrants dead, according to Eritrean Roman Catholic priest Moses Zerai. In Sabha, two African migrants were killed and several others wounded when unknown assailants threw an explosive device at the home where they stayed.

On 24 August, following the deadly clashes of the day before, the shrine of Sufi scholar Sidi Abd As-Salam Al-Asmar in Zliten (which had been target of an earlier attack in March) was destroyed by Salafist groups using a bulldozer and explosives, according to Zlitan military council official Omar Ali and witnesses. The attackers have also blown up the mosque attached to it and its library, filmed the events and posted the footage online.

On 25 August, the Al-Shaab Al-Dahmani mosque and shrine in central Tripoli was bulldozed in broad daylight by a group of armed Salafists, including members of the security forces. According to witnesses, when the police came, they prevented people from approaching instead of stopping the demolition, while an anonymous government officer alleged that after a small clash they sealed the area to prevent violence from spreading. One of the assailants affirmed that the Interior Ministry had authorised the operation after discovering practices of worshipping and "black magic" at the shrine. According to witnesses, the Sheikh Ahmad Zarruq mausoleum in the port of Misrata was also destroyed. On 26 August, several Libyan government officials as President of the General National Congress Mohamed Yousef el-Magariaf, or Supreme Military Council spokesman Abdel Moneim al-Hurr condemned the demolition. Deputy Prime Minister Mustafa Abushagur stated on Twitter: "The destruction of shrines and mosques is a crime. Those who commit these crimes will be held responsible… I asked the Ministry of the Interior and the Ministry of Defence to intervene yesterday but they did not do their duty to protect these sites." The Grand Mufti of Libya Sheikh Sadik Al-Ghariani condemned the desecration of graves and holy sites, which he described as "not religiously permissible" and "a violation of the sanctity of the dead". International non-governmental organizations (like HRW or ANHRI) and UNESCO also denounced the attacks.

==== September 2012 ====
On 2 September, clashes between two rival young men groups in Zawiya for the theft of a car resulted in seven killed and thirteen injured, ending with the intervention of local security forces. The same day, the joint venture between AGOCO and Repsol announced a halt on oil production at the Akakus fields in the Murzuq basin, following an attack on some company personnel by the guards of the complex. In Benghazi, a car bomb exploded in Gamal Abdel Nasser street, at the center of the city, killing a Colonel of the former government security services and wounding the other passenger. While at first Supreme Security Committee spokesman Abdel Moneim al-Hurr said that the driver was carrying the bombing device, he later affirmed that the two men, both intelligence officers, had been the target of the explosion.

Between 3 and 4 September, a group of Wershifanna tribesmen located a fake checkpoint at the Zahra bridge, in the road between Tripoli and Aziziya, killing between one and three travellers and kidnapping seven others from the Nafusa mountains. On Tuesday 4 September, an agreement was made with the group fleeing the checkpoint and releasing the hostages in exchange for the liberation of a Wershifanna man accused of car theft.

On 7 September, a Salafist militia attacked the Sidi Al-Lafi mausoleum in Rajma. In the clashes with local residents that followed, three militiamen were killed and seven people were injured, according to Interior Ministry sources. Finally, the Libya Shield Brigade was deployed to stop the violence. Wisam Bin Hamid, leader of the Libya Shield Force in Cirenaica raised later the injured toll to thirteen, and denied reports that his forces were involved in the attack.

On 10 September, Air Defense Colonel Badr Khamis Al-Obeidi was killed by unknown gunmen in a drive-by shooting when he was leaving the Saida Aisha mosque in Benghazi.

On 11 September (eleventh anniversary of the September 11 attacks), heavy armed Islamist militiamen attacked all the night with rocket-propelled grenades, hand grenades, assault rifles and mortars the US consulate building in Benghazi and a CIA annex, killing four United States citizens, including Ambassador J. Christopher Stevens.

In Benghazi, in late September, mass protests forced the Islamist militia Ansar al-Sharia to withdraw from their barracks and flee. People in the crowd waved swords and even a meat cleaver, shouting "No more al-Qaeda!" and "The blood we shed for freedom shall not go in vain!" They tore down the banner of group while chanting "no no to the brigades". 11 people were killed during the clashes in Benghazi, including six government soldiers who were found executed outside the city. Militias were blamed for the soldier's deaths. A colonel was also reported missing and feared kidnapped.

At the same time, Essam al Katous, a senior security official reported that Gaddafi loyalists killed 20 militiamen and abducted 30 other from a bus in the southern town of Barek al-Shati where they clashed for several days with a pro-government militia.

On 14 September, Benghazis airport closed because of heavy anti-aircraft fire from Islamist militias aimed to hit United States drones who were flying over the city.

On 17 September, the head of Sabhas military council, Colonel Ali Dallah Gaidi survived an assassination attempt in Ubari, but his wife was killed in the attack.

On 23 September, Libyan Prime Minister-elect Mustafa A.G. Abushagur office ordered, after meetings with representatives of Libyan political parties and security forces, all militias to either disband or come under army command in 48 hours.

On 25 September, Omran Shabaan died from his wounds in France. He was among the men who captured Gaddafi before his death. He was later allegedly captured and tortured in Bani Walid before being released when the prime minister visited the city earlier in the month. The General National Congress of Libya, which was evacuated that day following a firefight on a protest by disgruntled former NTC fighters, hailed Shabaan as a "brave hero" and called for inquires into the circumstances of his death in order to find and punish those responsible.

==== October 2012 ====
On 2 October, clashes erupted between pro-government militias from Misrata and local militiamen in Bani Walid, with a result of one death and between five and ten wounded.

On 3 October, three policemen were killed on a checkpoint in Susa, with a fourth injured in a critical condition, who died days later. Jabal al Akhdar district police chief Nasser Zayed blamed hardline Islamists for the attack.

By 8 October, thousands of soldiers surrounded Bani Walid and gave a deadline of 10 October to surrender the men who had tortured Omran Shaban to death, or face the town being stormed. Shelling of the town was reported, but the Misratan commanders denied they had any artillery that they could use against the town.

On 9 October, Misratan fighters, who besieged Bani Walid since the beginning of the month, killed three residents, including a child, and injured seven others during an artillery attack on the town, according to Colonel Salem Waer, who was leading the Bani Walid fighters. In a counter-attack, nine Misratan fighters were wounded.

On 12 October, a night-time curfew was imposed in Sirte by the local SSC, due to clashes between Warfalla tribesmen and Misratans fueled by the situation in Bani Walid. On the first night of the curfew, two members of the armed forces were injured by gunfire.

On 16 October, Captain Adel Baqramawi was killed when unknown assailants threw a bomb from a pick-up truck to his car, marking at least the 15th military official to be murdered in Benghazi in 2012.

On 26 October, a masked man entered a café in Benghazi and shot twice in the face Haitham Warfali, killing him instantly. A friend of the murdered was also wounded in the leg by the attacker. Friends of the victim linked the execution with his involvement in organising demonstrations in the city to protest the blockade of Bani Walid.

On 28 October a Gambian migrant was shot dead by militiamen in Tripoli, according to eyewitnesses.

==== November 2012 ====
On 4 November, the head of Cyrenaica Transitional Council's military wing, Hamid Al-Hassi, narrowly survived an assassination attempt that left one of his bodyguards killed and two injured.

In Tripoli, the arrest attempt on Mohamed Al-Warfali, leader of a ministry of Interior SSC brigade, started clashes in Sidi Khalifa district. Warfali was arrested in October after what he was accused of supplying Bani Walid militia with weapons during battle and escaped under unclear circumstances. Militiamen set on fire the SSC headquarters, damaging also a nearby hospital, and looting shops on Zawiya street. Fighting lasted for much of the day, until army reinforcements arrived and Warfalli, together with 11 of his men, surrendered. Fighting allegedly killed at least 11 people, with some sources putting number up to 18, but there was no confirmation of the deaths. Angry residents also set ablaze Warfali house in the district. Meanwhile, a protest at Zawiya's refinery caused petrol shortage in the Libyan capital.

On 5 November, the corpse of former NTC Tarhuna's representative Abdel Basset Abu Naama was found on a locked car at the town. He had been kidnapped the day before, with his body allegedly showing torture signs and a fatal gunshot into the head. In Khoms, one person was reported killed and four others injured in clashes between the SSC forces and a local militia named Katibat Nusur Al-Sahel ("The Coast Eagles").

On 6 November, the dead body of a retired colonel who had supported the NTC during the war was found in his farm in Benghazi, with shots in the head and chest.

On 10 November, armed clashes took place in Tiji (Nafusa Mountains) between local troops and a Kabaw-based militia, when the latter tried to take weapons and ammunition from a military base in the neighbour town. One Kabaw militiamen was killed and several wounded in both sides.

On 12 November, the secretary of Sirte local council was killed by unknown gunmen outside the town's medical institute, allegedly because his support to the NTC during the war.

On 21 November, unidentified gunmen shot and killed Benghazi's police chief Faraj al-Deirsy in front of his home in the latest attack against security officials in Libya's second largest city.

==== December 2012 ====
On 15 December, three Libyan soldiers, including two Captains, were killed in Bani Walid when they were ambushed by gunmen who were then reported to have taken full control of the Darha area. The next day, four policemen were killed in two attacks by Islamist gunmen in Benghazi. In Tripoli, the GNC announced the temporary closure of the borders with Algeria, Niger, Chad and Sudan, and declared southern Libya as a "closed military zone". In Traghan, the head of the local council was killed and two members of his family wounded by unknown assailants.

On 20 December, during a demonstration calling for the release of a prisoner at the Security Directorate in Benghazi, clashes erupted between protesters and security forces, leaving at least one policemen, one soldier, two armed attackers and three civilians killed, as well as 16 wounded (8 civilians and 8 from the security forces).

On 27 December, an unknown gunman killed Lieutenant Awad Mohamed Al-Fakhri and injured his mother, in their family house at Al-Abyar, near Benghazi.

On 29 December, unknown assailants attacked with home-made dynamite or a grenade the Coptic church of Mar Girgis in Dafniya, near Misrata, killing two Egyptians and injuring another two. Both Egyptian Foreign Affairs Minister Mohamed Kamel Amr and the Head of Libya's Copts, Father Timothaus Bishara Adla condemned the attack. Meanwhile, in Tripoli, units of the local SSC and police officers clashed again because the detention of a SSC member. In Ubari, at least two Libya Shield militiamen were killed and an unknown number injured in armed clashes.

=== 2013 ===
==== January 2013 ====
On 6 January, GNC president Mohamed Magarief announced that he had been the target of an assassination attempt at the hotel in Sabha where he was staying with his delegation on a visit. He told the Libyan state television that gunmen attacked the hotel with heavy gun-fire. An ongoing battle between Magarief's personal bodyguards and the gunmen lasted for three hours and left three of his guards wounded. Although, a spokesman for the Defense Ministry said that he believed the shooting in Sebha had not been specifically aimed at the GNC President, but linked to the intertribal clashes of the precedent days in the town.

On 8 January, clashes erupted at the university campus in Kufra, leaving two or three killed, with the local council claiming they were unknown armed militants shot by troops, while the Toubou community claimed they were Toubou civilians assassinated by Zway militiamen.

On 10 January, angry protesters tried to storm the Nawasi brigade headquarters at Mitiga Airport, in retaliation for the killing of Najmi Ibrahim Al-Abani. The clashes that continued in Tripoli since 7 January cost the life of at least five other people, with several wounded.

On 19 January, gunfire erupted between militiamen and the bodyguards of the Libyan Defence Minister while the latter was visiting an Air Force base in Tobruk. Mohammed Mahmoud Al-Bargati accused later his former deputy Siddiq Al-Ghaith of inciting an attempt to kill him, rejecting Al-Ghaith claims that the incident had been only a "tribal matter". In Ghadames, the local council denounced that the town was besieged by Zintan border guards, who had clashed with local militiamen, with no serious injuries.

==== February–May 2013 ====
On the weekend of 23–24 February, at least two people were killed and one wounded in Kufra, in renewed deadly clashes between Zway and Tebu tribesmen.

A car bomb exploded outside the French embassy injuring two French guards. While Libya called it a "terrorist attack," French President François Hollande called on the Libyans to bring the perpetrators "to justice." French Foreign Minister Laurent Fabius also said: "This was a terrorist act ... aimed at killing. The terrorists who wanted to attack France and Libya and undermine the friendship between them will pay." He then flew to Tripoli where he inspected the site of the attack with host Prime Minister Ali Zeidan. Though no one claimed responsibility for the attack, AQIM had threatened to retaliate for the French intervention in Mali just a week before the incident. The British Council in Tripoli was targeted by a car bomb simultaneously with the attack on the French Embassy in Tripoli. It was reported that "the bombers were foiled as they were preparing to park a rigged vehicle in front of the compound gate, diplomatic sources say".

On 27 April, Chadian President Idriss Deby accused Libya of not doing enough to stop Chadian mercenaries from training at a camp set up near Benghazi. He said: "Libya is now infested with mercenaries. Camps are set up [for] them in Benghazi where Chadians are assembled and recruited. I know who is directing and commanding those mercenaries. I call on Libyan authorities to take every possible measure to spare Chad from new plot being originates in their country." Libyan Ambassador to the UN Ibrahim Dabbashi said Deby's claims were not credible: "The president of Chad used to be a good friend of [Muammar] Gaddafi. He [Deby] was blackmailing Gaddafi in the past to get the money to support the regime ... Maybe [Deby] now is looking for a kind of support outside his country."

The next day about 200 heavily armed, including anti-aircraft weapons, surrounded the foreign ministry building demanding an end to former government officials from the old regime getting leadership positions in the new regime. The commander of the group surrounding the building said that it had been targeted as officials from the former regime worked there. He added: "The Ministry of Foreign Affairs will remain closed until the political isolation law is implemented." On 30 April, armed men surrounded the Justice Ministry for the same reason.

On 3 May, several hundred people protested in Tripoli's Algeria Square against those who laid siege to the aforementioned ministries. They carried placards that read: "The era of the militias is over," "Attacks on the ministries are attacks on the Libyan people" and "No to weapons, yes to dialogue." As they marched to Martyrs' Square they were attacked by others who supported the adoption of a law to ban members of the previous regime for partaking in the incumbent regime.

As a result of the continued influence of militias Defence Minister Mohammed al-Baragthi announced his resignation. However, Prime Minister convinced him to rescind his resignation. Al Jazeera quoted him as saying that he "can't be a part of this, either by being silent and taking no action, or by taking any action because he can't be part of the shedding of Libyan blood if he takes any action as a responsible official or as a minister of defence."

On 13 May, 17 people were killed in car bomb incident in Benghazi, according to the Libyan Defense Ministry.

==== June–July 2013 ====
On 4 June, in the intertribal clashes in the village at the city of Sabha, located in the south of Libya, at least six people were killed.

Benghazi clashes

On 8 June, at least 31 people were killed and 100 wounded in clashes in Benghazi between protesters and a militia operating with Defence Ministry approval. Five of the dead were soldiers and one was a militiaman.

On 14 June, six soldiers were killed in Benghazi in clashes between Libyan special forces and armed protesters. The previous night, an Army convoy transporting military vehicles from Tripoli to Sabha was ambushed resulting in the deaths of three of the attackers and an Army brigade commander.

On 26–27 June, 10 people were killed in clashes in Tripoli. Minister of Defence Mohammed al-Bargathi resigned after that. Two people were also killed and 17 injured in three car bomb explosions in Sabha.

On 26 July, Muslim Brotherhood critic Abdelsalam al-Mosmary was fatally shot after leaving a mosque following Friday prayers during Ramadan. In the aftermath protesters attacked Muslim Brotherhood property in both Benghazi and the capital Tripoli. Violence continued for the next few days.

==== August 2013 ====
On 14 August, Armed group seize Tripoli psychiatric hospital staff. An armed group were reported to have yesterday kidnapped the head of Tripoli's psychiatric hospital and three members of staff, according to Solidarity Press.

==== September 2013 ====
On 2 September, two soldiers were killed and another injured when the military vehicle they were travelling in was ambushed by unknown armed men yesterday near Sirte. The soldiers were on the coastal road, around 40 kilometres east of Sirte, when their vehicle came under fire, Military Commander for the Sirte area, Salah Abu Hligha, told the Libya Herald. The soldiers were on their way home to Benghazi from a military mission in Tripoli.

On 25 September, The son of the Libya's Defence Minister, Abdullah Al-Thini, was abducted yesterday afternoon, a source close to the Ministry of Defence told the Libya Herald under the condition of anonymity.He was kidnapped in Janzour, but the reasons behind the abduction are still unknown.

On 27 September, One man was reported killed and two others injured when the police station in Gubba was damaged in a massive car bomb attack early this morning, around sunrise.The dead man and the two injured – all said to be Egyptians – were in a house next door to the police headquarters. The reasons for the attack are unclear. The complex also houses the National Security Directorate, the town's court, the prosecutor's offices and the local registration and licensing authorities. The size of the bomb was such that parts of the buildings were destroyed. There were only charred parts left of the vehicle used in the bombing.

A group of tribal elders in southern Libya are reported to have held a preparatory meeting in Obari on Thursday to discuss the possibility of setting up a "Fezzan Supreme Council" similar to the Cyrenaica Transitional Council set up last year by Cyrenaica federalists.However, reports that the meeting declared Fezzan, one of the three Libyan historic provinces, a federal state within Libya have been denied by a local source. He said that a meeting to decide on the future of the Fezzan would be held next week. "Yesterday's meeting was like an advertisement for the main meeting next week in Obari," the source said.

On 29 September, Three security officials were murdered in separate attacks in Benghazi today, according to the spokesman for Benghazi Joint Security Room, Abdullah Al-Zaidi. Colonel Abdulkadir Mohamed Ahmed Al-Madani, Associate Director of Intelligence in the eastern region was seven shots by unknown assailants in a black Jeep in front of his home in the city's Laithi district. He died instantly, Zaidi told the Libya Herald. One of his sons who was with him was also shot and was taken to hospital. Helicopter pilot Ali Adam Aldgara died when a bomb blew up under his car in the Suq Zamzam area.

==== October 2013 ====
In October a United Nations report said that torture and ill-treatment, sometimes resulting in death, was "widespread" in Libyan jails. This torture was most frequently used "immediately after arrest and during the first days of interrogation" according to the report. The UN estimates about 8,000 people are still being held in relation to the 2011 conflict. The United Nations Support Mission in Libya said it has recorded 27 deaths in custody since late 2011 "where there is significant information to suggest that torture was the cause", with 11 of the cases occurring in 2013. The report did note however that the use of torture was happening "despite the efforts of the Libyan authorities which are committed at the highest level to ending torture and to ensuring the proper functioning of the criminal justice system" and recommended that detainees held by brigades be handed over to "effective state control".

On 2 October, a group of locals attacked and torched the police station in Suq Al-Juma following the death of a local resident.The man, who has not been named, was shot dead by the Quwat Al-Rada, the special deterrence force in Tripoli. It claims the man, originally from Ajilat, southwest of Sabratha, was drunk and resisted arrest.

Also on 2 October, gunfire was reported outside the Russian embassy in Tripoli after a Russian woman killed a Libyan air force officer and injured his mother. The Embassy was evacuated the next day and incident was dramatized as a full scale attack in the 2017 TV series Sleepers (Spyashchiye), but in real life there seem to have been no injuries.

Jebel Nafusa towns united over road attacks and closures. Responding to the closure of the main road linking towns in the Nafusa mountains to Tripoli and attacks on people who were using it, local councils in the region decided to set up a joint committee to coordinate on the region's affairs and problems. The towns taking part were Zintan, Jadu, Mizdah, Ghariyan, Nalut, Qala and Rujban. At a meeting in Nalut, representatives of the towns' local councils said that a safer alternative route to the capital had to be found to the one passing through Warshefana territory.

On 4 October, police stations in Benghazi were attacked. Two police stations were bombed in Benghazi in what was being seen as a linked attack. Sabri police station was attacked at around 4.30 am. Three and a half hours later, a bomber went off at Birkah police station – the fifth time it has been attacked this year. In both cases, there was damage to the buildings but no casualties.

On 5 October, gunmen killed at least 12 Libyan soldiers in an attack on a checkpoint near the city of Bani Walid, a former stronghold of supporters of Muammar Gadhafi, security officials said. "The ambush happened on the road between Bani Walid and the town of Tarhouna, where the army had a checkpoint. They came under heavy gunfire. Between 12 and 15 soldiers were killed," said Ali Sheikhi, a spokesman for the army joint chief of staff. Army Capt. Hassan al-Saidah said 15 soldiers had been killed and five wounded in the attack, which forced officials to close the main road to Bani Walid.

On 10 October Prime Minister Ali Zeidan was kidnapped for several hours in what he later referred to as an attempted coup.

==== November 2013 ====
On 16 November, militias from Misrata clashed in Tajoura, an eastern Tripoli suburb where checkpoints were set up to keep outside militia from entering the city. The news followed imams calling for an end to the militias, which in turn led to violence that erupted at an anti-militia protest that also called for resignation of the government the previous day in Tripoli and occurred during mourning for the dead at that protest. At least 45 people were killed and 400 wounded, according to Justice Minister Salah al-Marghani said. The next day another person was killed and dozens others were wounded as clashes continued and a 48-hour state of emergency was declared, while Prime Minister Ali Zeidan called for those from outside the city to withdraw. He said: "The armed manifestations and bullying on the state with the weapons that were seized during the revolution (against Muammar Gaddafi) is unaccepted by the people" and the violence by outside militias "would have negative and catastrophic consequences."

On 17 November the deputy intelligence chief, Mustafa Noah, was also kidnapped outside Tripoli airport. The same day, the head of Tripoli's municipal council, Al-Sadat al-Badri, said that a strike being carried out on the day (Sunday is a working day in the Middle East) would go on for three days if the demands of a majority of public and private sectors' demands for the militiamen to leave was not met. He said: "We have declared a strike for three days from today, but if our demands are not met we will continue. We will not negotiate with them. Things are as clear as the sun, we want a decision." The call for a strike was to allow "the government, the police and the army." Businesses and schools were closed but essential services like pharmacies, hospitals and petrol pumps were open. Residents were also armed as they set up checkpoints and barricades of metal, wood and tires to protect the various neighbourhoods amid fears of renewed violence. The Misrata militia was reported to have abandoned its headquarters in south Tripoli's Gharghour, according to state media. Late the previous day the government-affiliated militia, the Libya Shield-Central Command, said it was in control of Gharghour and that it would hand it over to the government.

The next day, Benghazi's military governor Colonel Abdallah al-Saati survived an assassination attempts that killed one other person and wounded another in his motorcade. According to a parliamentary security committee official, Noah was also released. The Misrata militia also began withdrawing as the army moved to secure the sites." Withdrawal of Misrati militias was soon followed by withdrawal of militias from cities of Jadu and Gharyan, and also powerful Tripoli Nawasi brigade. Other militias also withdrew from the capital. Yet protesters gathered again on 22 November to urge the other militias in the capital to withdraw.

On 25 November in the Benghazi neighborhood of Birkah, fighting between the army special forces Thunderbolt Brigade and the militant Islamist group Ansar al-Sharia started after the Islamists first attacked a military position. The Thunderbolt Brigade was soon reinforced by armed locals, and after a day of heavy fighting the Ansar al-Sharia bases within the city were destroyed and all of its militiamen seemed to have somehow simply "vanished" from the city. The heavy fighting on this day left at least 6 soldiers and 1 civilian dead.

On 28 November, 3 soldiers were killed and 3 others wounded in clashes with militants in the Sidi Khalifa district of Benghazi after they stopped a car loaded with weapons, explosives, and large sums of money that was trying to enter the city from the east. Another soldier was shot dead when militants in a van fired a volley at two soldiers as they got into a car. According to a medic at Benghazi's Al-jala hospital, "the soldier died after being shot in the head". Special Forces defending the hospital were shot at later in the night though no casualties were reported.

==== December 2013 ====
On 5 December, an American teacher was gunned down while out on a morning jog in the al-Fwihet neighborhood of Eastern Benghazi.

=== 2014 ===
==== January 2014 ====
On 18 January, the Libyan air force attacked targets in the south of Libya because of unrest blamed on forces loyal to ousted leader Muammar Gaddafi. The government also declared a state of emergency after Gaddafi loyalists took over the Tamahind air force base near the southern city of Sabha. On 22 January Voice of Russia featured a report with Libyans who claimed that much of the southern half of the country as well as Bani Walid had fallen under the control of the "Green" Gaddafi loyalists, and that some foreign Libyan embassies were flying the Gaddafi-era green flag in support. The interviewed Libyans claimed to be fighting against a Western-backed "puppet government" with ties to Al-Qaeda, and charged that Qatar was paying Sudanese pilots to bomb their positions. On the other hand, the more government-friendly Libya Herald newspaper reported that a large contingent of Gaddafi-friendly fighters were scattered near Ajilat as they tried to aid other Gaddafi-loyalists in Sabha, with five of them killed. The report claimed that if the events were part of a coordinated movement, "it does not appear to be well organised, let alone have any significant or measurable support."

On 24 January, nine soldiers were killed and 27 injured near Tripoli in clashes with Gaddafi loyalists.

==== Escalation of conflict ====
A significant escalation of the conflict began in May 2014. On 18 May 2014, the parliament building was reported to have been stormed by troops loyal to General Khalifa Haftar, reportedly including the Zintan Brigade, in what the Libyan government described as an attempted coup.

== See also ==
- Aftermath of the Libyan Civil War
- Gaddafi loyalism after the Libyan Civil War
- Reactions to Innocence of Muslims
