= Western Libya campaign order of battle =

This is the order of battle for the Western Libya campaign, codenamed "Operation Flood of Dignity" by forces under Field Marshal Khalifa Haftar. The forces supporting Haftar and the House of Representatives, mainly the Libyan National Army, are opposed by the armed forces of the forces loyal to the Government of National Accord, including the Libyan Army and the Tripoli Protection Force.

== Pro-House of Representatives forces ==
(Libya) House of Representatives

- Libyan National Army
  - 9th Brigade (Kaniyat militia/brigade)
  - 106th Brigade
  - Security Operations Room
  - Counter-Terrorism Unit
  - Madkhali forces
    - Tariq bin Ziyad Battalion/Brigade
    - Subul Al-Salam Battalion/Brigade
    - Al-Wadi Brigade
    - Tawhid Battalion (lit. "Oneness Battalion")
    - 604th Infantry Battalion (since 6 January 2020)
- Libyan Navy (LNA–aligned)
- Libyan Air Force (LNA–aligned)
- (History of Libya under Muammar Gaddafi) Popular Front for the Liberation of Libya (PFLL)

Allied armed groups:

- (Russia) Wagner Group
  - (Syria) Nukhba unit ("Elite Unit")

United Arab Emirates (per GNA)

- United Arab Emirates Air Force

== Pro-Government of National Accord forces ==
(Libya) Government of National Accord

- Libyan Ground Forces
  - 4th Brigade
  - 7th Kani (al-Kaniyat) Brigade
  - 301rd Halboos Infantry Battalion
- Ministry of Interior
  - Special Deterrence Force (SDF)
- Tripoli Protection Force
  - Tripoli Revolutionaries Brigade
  - Nawasi Battalion (8th Force)
  - Abu Salim Joint Deterrence and Intervention Force
  - Bab Tajoura armed group
- Libyan Air Force (GNA–aligned)
- Libyan Navy (GNA-aligned)

Allied armed groups:

- Misrata militias
- Zawiya militias
- Libya Shield Force (alleged)
- Sirte militias
  - Sirte Protection and Security Force
  - 604th Infantry Battalion (until 6 January 2020)
- (Syrian opposition) Syrian National Army (since Dec. 2019)
  - Sham Legion
  - (Syrian opposition) Ahrar al-Sharqiya
  - Sultan Suleiman Shah Brigade
  - Samarkand Brigade
  - Sultan Murad Division
  - (Syrian opposition) Hamza Division
  - Mu'tasim Division
  - (Syrian opposition) Northern Falcons Brigade
  - (Syrian opposition) Suqour al-Sham Brigades
  - (Syrian opposition) Glory Corps
  - Former al-Nusra Front fighters (LNA claim)

Turkey (since Jan. 2020)

- Turkish Armed Forces
  - Turkish Land Forces
  - Turkish Navy
  - Turkish Air Force
  - Special Forces Command
- National Intelligence Organization
