= Maria Ribeiro (disambiguation) =

Maria Ribeiro (born 1975) is a Brazilian actress.

Maria Ribeiro may also refer to:

- Maria do Valle Ribeiro (born 1957), United Nations diplomat born in Portugal
- Maria Eugénia Martins de Nazaré Ribeiro, Portuguese judge
- Maria Angélica Ribeiro, Brazilian playwright
