= Tariq Ben Zeyad Brigade =

Libyan militant organization

- كتيبة طارق بن زياد
- Military leader: Saddam Haftar
- Dates active: 2016–present
- Country: Libya
- Allegiance: Libyan National Army
- Ideology: Madkhalism

Tariq Ben Zeyad Brigade (TBZ; Arabic: كتيبة طارق بن زياد) is a militant organization led by Saddam Haftar, son of Libyan National Army (LNA) commander Khalifa Haftar. It has been accused of crushing any opposition to his father's LNA since its emergence in 2016. In December 2022, Saddam's Tariq Ben Zeyad Brigade was accused by the Amnesty International of committing war crimes.

== Composition ==
Tariq Ben Zeyad is one of the largest and most influential armed groups that operate under the Libyan Arab Armed Forces. It is a mix of Gaddafist soldiers who fought on the side of Muammar Gaddafi in the 2011 Libyan Civil War and fighters from tribes allied to LNA.

== Timeline ==
On 24 August 2021, Saddam Haftar met with the commander of the Misrata-based 166 Brigade Mohammed al-Hassan to discuss the formation of a joint unit. This joint unit composed of the TBZ and 166 Brigade would operate to secure the central region from al-Shuwarif through to Mizdah with a focus on the GMMR pipeline through to al-Hasawna wells.

On 25 November 2021, the TBZ, led by Saddam and Khalid, stormed the courthouse in Sabha to prevent judges from hearing Saif al-Islam Gaddafi's appeal to participate in the presidential election. The gunmen used arms against the staffers and judges and then kicked them out.

On 29 June 2022, the TBZ announced that it raided a farm in the south where terrorist groups were stationed and confiscated missiles and explosives.

On 12 September 2022, the Libya Crimes Watch reported that the Tariq Ben Zeyad Brigade set fire to the house of activist Senussi Al-Mahdi for criticizing the violations taking place in the Buhadi area south of Sirte. The LCW confirmed that five men are still forcibly disappeared.

On 19 December 2022, the TBZ was accused by the Amnesty International of committing war crimes.

On 6 October 2023, the TBZ participated in the kidnapping and eventual death of former Minister of Defense Al-Mahdi Al-Barghathi, kidnapping at least a further 7 individuals, and killing 60-70 bystanders in the process.

== Accusations ==
Tariq Ben Zeyad Brigade has been accused of terrorizing people by committing "unlawful killings, torture and other ill-treatment, enforced disappearance, rape and other sexual violence, and forced displacement — with no fear of consequences". The TBZ has been involved in the forcible removal of thousands of refugees and migrants from Sabha and surrounding areas since late 2021, as well as the forced displacement of Libyan families during the LNA's military campaigns to take control of the cities of Benghazi and Derna in eastern Libya between 2014 and 2019.
