= Operation Volcano of Rage =

- Part of the Libyan civil war (2014-2020)
Date	April 7, 2019 – June 6, 2020
Location	Libya
Result	GNA victory

Belligerents
(Libya) Government of National Accord: Libyan Army; Supported by: Turkey; Qatar	(Libya) House of Representatives: Libyan National Army; Supported by: UAE; Egypt; Russia; Israel; France

Commanders and leaders
(Libya) Prime Minister Fayez al-Sarraj (head of Presidential Council) (Libya) Maj. Gen. Osama al-Juwaili	(Libya) Field Marshal Khalifa Haftar (LNA supreme commander) (Libya) Maj. Gen. Abdulrazek al-Nadoori

Operation Volcano of Rage (Arabic: عملية بركان الغضب), alternatively known as Operation Volcano of Anger, was a military resistance campaign launched by the Government of National Accord in Libya to counter the advances of the Libyan National Army led by General Khalifa Haftar. The conflict, which began in April 2019, had witnessed intense fighting around the capital city, Tripoli, and other strategic locations in the country.

== Background ==
The operation was officially announced on April 7, 2019, by Colonel Mohamed Gnounou, the GNA military spokesman. It was initiated as a counteroffensive to reclaim territories in Tripoli that had been seized by the LNA. The GNA mobilized various militias, including those from Misrata, to prevent the LNA from capturing Tripoli and other key locations.

== Key Events ==
On June 26, the GNA announced a significant victory as Operation Volcano of Rage captured the town of Gharyan from the LNA. Fierce fighting ensued, resulting in the deaths of dozens of LNA soldiers, with at least 18 reported as captured by the GNA. The GNA's air force also targeted LNA convoys withdrawing from the area.

On October 1, Haftar's forces, supported by the UAE, launched artillery shells on Mitiga Airport in Tripoli, as reported by sources from Burkan Al-Ghadab Operation. This marked an escalation of the conflict, with both sides resorting to airstrikes and artillery attacks.

Airstrikes on Misrata Airport by foreign warplanes, backed by the LNA, were reported on October 5. Additionally, attacks on the Equestrian School in Janzour, west of Tripoli, caused casualties among civilians, including children, and led to the destruction of military vehicles.

On December 14, heavy clashes occurred in Al-Tughar district in southern Tripoli, where Volcano of Anger Operation forces faced a significant offensive from Haftar's forces. Following intense fighting, the GNA forces, under the command of the Libyan Presidential Council, repelled the attack and seized control of the district.

Notably, on May 4, 2020, GNA forces advanced against Haftar's militias around the Hamza military camp, destroying armed and armored vehicles. Airstrikes targeted an ammunition depot inside the Haftar airbase, resulting in casualties. The operation aimed to cut off Haftar's supply lines, and additional strikes hit oil tankers in the Al Qaryat region.

The next day, a new offensive was launched to capture Al-Watiya airbase, culminating in its capture on May 18, 2020. Following this success, the GNA forces expanded their control, capturing the towns of Badr and Tiji by May 19, 2020.

On May 25, the mayor of Bani Walid, said that Russian Wagner Group mercenaries allied to the LNA retreated from Western Libya to an unconfirmed destination along with their heavy equipment. After Antonov An-32 cargo planes landed at Bani Walid airport.

On June 4, 2020, GNA forces launched an attack on Tripoli Airport, which they captured successfully. The operation declared 100% control over all administrative borders of Tripoli, expelling the last remnants of Haftar's forces. This marked the end of the LNA's 14-month siege of the GNA capital

On June 5, 2020, the GNA officially declared that they had full control over Tarhuna, having expelled the LNA-aligned militias from there.

== Conclusion ==
The operation was successful in recapturing Tripoli, as well as many other cities and towns around it.

== Reactions ==
The operation received very positive feedback by the Libyan population, with many eager to join the resistance. Celebrations erupted in the Martyrs' Square when the operation culminated in a success.
