= Firjan =

Arab Murabtin tribe in Libya

The Firjan (also al-Firjan) (Arabic: الفرجان) is an Arab Murabtin tribe in Libya. They live across northern Libya, with large populations in the Sirte, Ajdabiya, Benghazi, Murqub (Tarhuna) districts. The nisbah of tribe is al-Firjani.

== Libyan civil war ==
While many Firjani joined the revolt against Muammar Gaddafi (most notably in Ajdabiya and Benghazi) the status of others such as those in Sirte is uncertain. Khalifa Haftar, the current commander of the Libyan National Army is Firjani. His brother is the chief of the Firjan community in Benghazi.
