= Osama al-Juwaili =

Libyan military officer (born 1961)

Osama al-Juwaili أسامة الجويلي
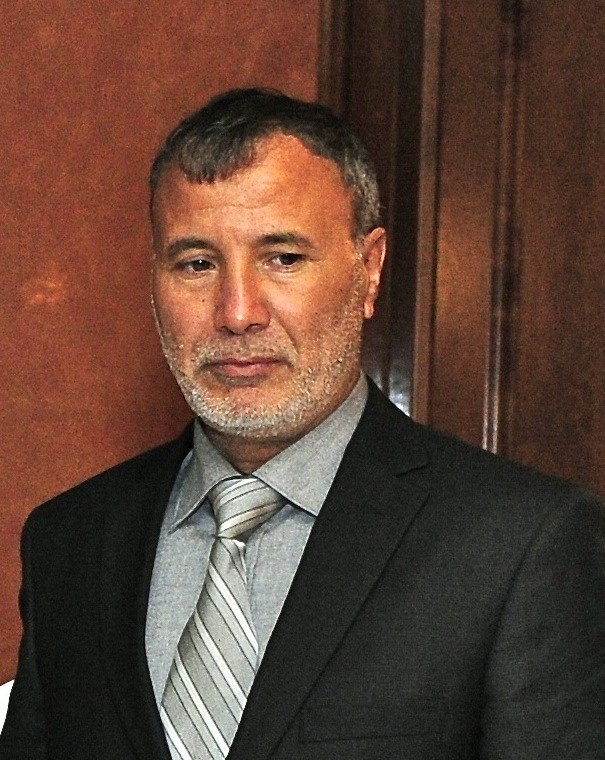

Minister of Defense
- In office 22 November 2011 – 14 November 2012
- Prime Minister: Abdurrahim El-Keib; Ali Zeidan
- Preceded by: Jalal al-Digheily
- Succeeded by: Mohammad al-Bargathi

Personal details
- Born: 1961 (age 64–65) Zintan, Kingdom of Libya (present-day Libya)
- Profession: Trainer; Military Commander

Major General Osama al-Juwaili (Arabic: أسامة الجويلي) is a Libyan military officer who served as Minister of Defence in the government of Abdurrahim El-Keib, Libya's interim Prime Minister. Since the formation of the Government of National Accord (GNA) in 2015, al-Juwaili served it as a senior commander, since 2017 being the commander of the Western Military Zone. On 6 April 2019 he became the commander of the joint operations room, created by Prime Minister Fayez al-Sarraj to coordinate military operations since the start of the 2019 Western Libya offensive.

He fought in the First Libyan Civil War against the government of Muammar Gaddafi. Immediately prior to his appointment on 22 November 2011, Juwali's Zintan Brigade, a band of anti-Gaddafi fighters based in Zintan in Libya's Nafusa Mountains, located and captured Saif al-Islam Gaddafi, one of the former Libyan leader's most prominent sons, in the Libyan Desert. al-Juwaili is said to be aligned with the Tripoli Revolutionary Council (TRC) led by Abdullah Naker, who warned in an interview 18 November that his men could overthrow the government even before it was appointed if it failed to meet their demands for representation.

Studied "Electronic Support" and Graduated from the Tripoli Military Academy in 1982, he remained to be a trainer at the academy until 1987. He resigned from the army in 1992 with rank of captain. Juwali was then appointed as head of the Vocational Guidance center in Yifrin part of the Libyan Ministry of Workforce and Training. He defected to the anti-Gaddafi forces during the 2011 civil war, becoming the head of Zintan's military council. His uncle was reportedly a deputy governor of the Central Bank of Libya under Gaddafi.

In August 2022, Juwaili was involved in Fathi Bashagha's failed attempt to take Tripoli and overthrow the UN-recognized government of Abdul Hamid Dbeibeh.

== Political life ==
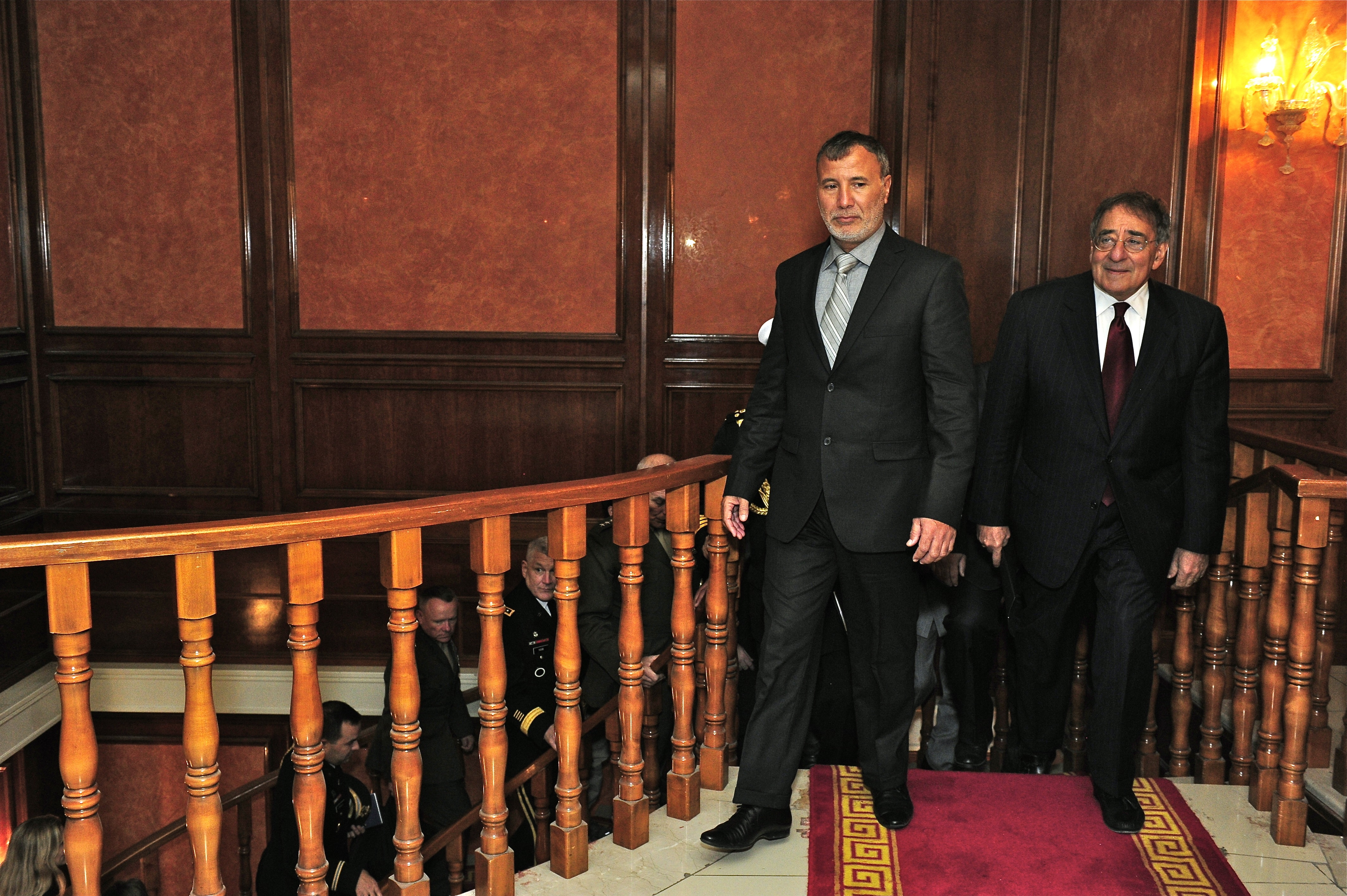
"U.S. Defense Secretary Leon E. Panetta walks with Libyan Minister of Defense Usama Al-Jwayli in Tripoli, Libya, Dec. 17, 2011. Panetta said the United States is ready to help Libya whenever the new government identifies its needs."

Juwaily met with Major General Isa Saif Al Mazrouie, Deputy Chief of Staff of the UAE Armed Forces in Tripoli on 6 December 2011 and discussed areas of cooperation between the two countries and ways of enhancing them, especially in the military sector.

Since January 2012, Juwaily is responsible for integrating the rival militias into a fully functioning army and police force.
