= Libya Crimes Watch =

Non-governmental human rights organization

- رصد الجرائم في ليبيا
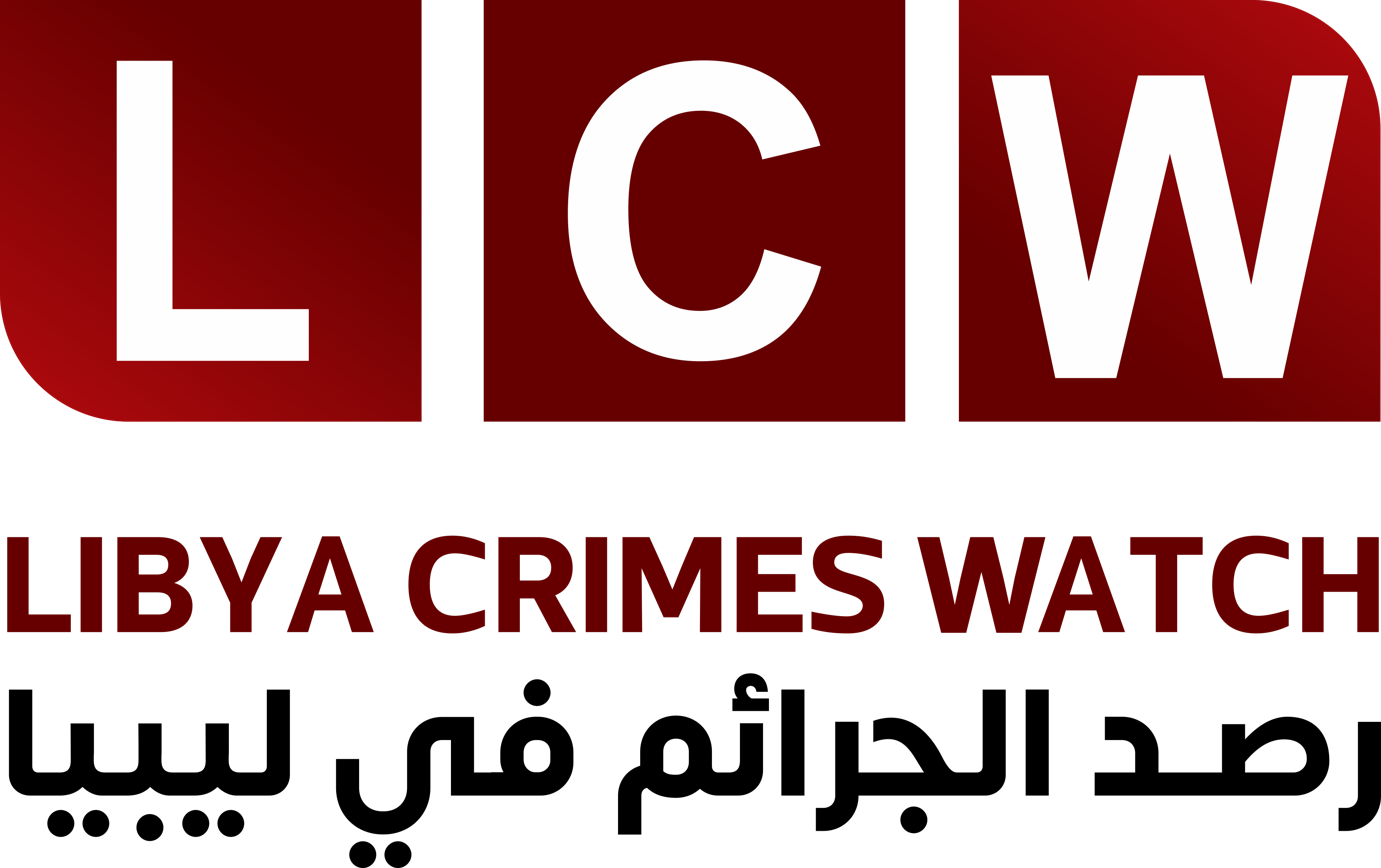
- Nickname: LCW
- Formation: 2019
- Founder: Ali Alaspli
- Type: NGO, nonprofit
- Headquarters: United Kingdom, Libya
- Members: The Libyan Platform Coalition, the Libyan Network Against Torture (LAN), the SOS Network Against Torture, the Coalition for the International Criminal Court (CICC), and the Global Alliance for Citizen Participation (CIVICUS)
- Official language: Arabic, English
- Website: lcw.ngo

Libya Crimes Watch (LCW; Arabic: رصد الجرائم في ليبيا) is a non-governmental, non-profit human rights organisation established in 2019 at the initiative of independent human rights activists, registered in the United Kingdom, and mainly specialised in monitoring and documenting international crimes and grave Human Rights Violations against civilians in Libya, and aims to spread a culture of human rights and work to bring criminals to justice .

The Libya Crimes Watch Organisation relies in its work on field investigative research carried out by a field monitoring team working on the ground covering various Libyan regions, as well as a wide network of sources. This research is based on investigating the facts of human rights violations, to obtain accurate information about the facts, their circumstances, the identity of the victims and the violating parties. It also documents testimonies, evidence, presumptions, records and related documents for examination and verification. The organization called on the Government of National Unity and the authorities in eastern Libya to end all Human Rights Violations, including kidnappings and enforced disappearances.

The LCW Organisation called on Haftar's forces to stop targeting residential communities, to spare civilians the armed conflict, and to abide by international humanitarian law "the rules of war", and held them legally and morally responsible for these grave Human Rights Violations. It called on the UN Security Council and the United Nations Support Mission in Libya to assume their responsibilities to protect civilians in Libya, and to send a fact-finding committee to investigate war crimes and bring the perpetrators to justice.

The Libya Crimes Watch Organisation monitors the human rights situation in Libya, and interacts with violations daily by publishing on its Facebook and Twitter platforms, as well as publishing data on the website and monthly reports summarizing the human rights violations that have been monitored and documented throughout Libya. The organization also participates in signing the Joint statements with international and local organisations with common competencies. The LCW works effectively within the Libyan platform, and is a founding member of the Libyan Anti-Torture Network and a member of the Coalition for the International Criminal Court, and SOS-Torture Network. It is also a member of the KeepItOn coalition against the internet shutdown.

== See also ==
- International human rights law
