= Saddam Haftar =

Libyan politician (born 1991)

- صدام حفتر
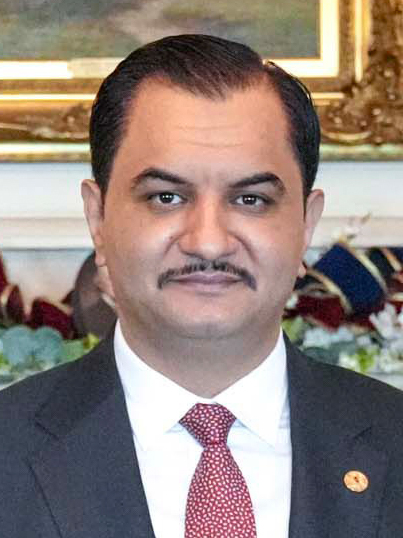
- Haftar in 2026
- Born: 1991 (age 34–35); Benghazi, Libya
- Military career
- Allegiance: (Libya) House of Representatives; Libyan Arab Army
- Citizenship: Libya; United States
- Service years: 2016–present
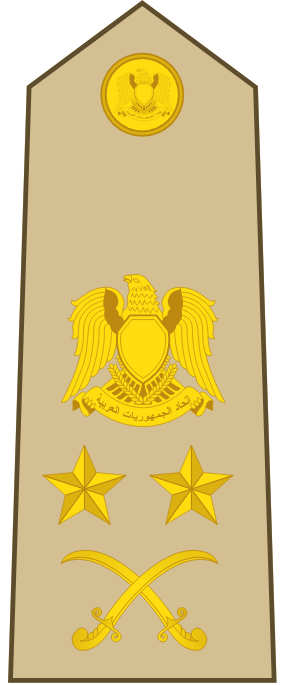
- Rank: General
- Commands: 106th Brigade; Tariq Ben Zeyad Brigade
- Conflicts: Second Libyan Civil War; Battle of Benghazi (2014–2017)

Saddam Haftar (Arabic: صدام حفتر, romanized: Ṣaddām Ḥaftar; born 1991) is a Libyan military officer and politician, serving as the chief of staff of the ground forces of the Libyan National Army and commander and de facto head of the Tariq Ben Zeyad Brigade. He is the son of Khalifa Haftar, the commander of the Libyan National Army and de facto leader of eastern Libya since 2017. He frequently travels abroad to make diplomatic visits to Arab and foreign countries and has been seen as the likely successor to his father.

== Early life ==
The youngest of seven children of Libyan warlord Khalifa Haftar, Saddam Haftar was born in Benghazi, Libya, in 1991, almost a year after his father fled into exile in the U.S., during the rule of Muammar Gaddafi. He and his brothers were raised in Benghazi. Not much is known about Haftar's upbringings, and he has no known secondary school qualifications. He is named after the former president of Iraq Saddam Hussein.

== Military career ==
He has been commander of the Tariq Ben Zeyad Brigade since its emergence in 2016, which has been accused of crushing any opposition to his father's Libyan Arab Armed Forces (LAAF). He established the 106th Brigade as a praetorian guard to protect his father and keep tribal militias under LAAF control, and with this he succeeded in recapturing Benghazi in December 2017. In December 2016, Haftar appeared at a military ceremony in Jordan during the graduation of the students of the military college, wearing a military uniform. He was granted the ranks of major and then lieutenant-colonel in an exceptional promotion granted to him by the Speaker of the Libyan Parliament, Aguila Saleh. Shortly thereafter, Saddam Haftar was promoted to the rank of colonel, surpassing Gaddafi himself. In August 2025, Saddam was appointed Deputy General Commander of the Army.

=== Allegations of human rights violations ===
As commander of the Tariq Ben Zeyad Brigade, Haftar has been accused by international human rights organisations of overseeing and directing systematic abuses in areas controlled by the Libyan National Army. According to Amnesty International, the brigade under his leadership has committed "a catalogue of horrors," including unlawful killings, torture and other ill-treatment, enforced disappearances, rape and other sexual violence, and forced displacement, primarily targeting critics, perceived opponents, and displaced families in eastern and southern Libya.

Amnesty’s December 2022 briefing identified Haftar and the group's field commander Omar Imraj' as bearing command responsibility for crimes that may amount to war crimes under international law. The organisation urged Libyan authorities and international bodies to investigate the Tariq Ben Zeyad Brigade's operations, close its unofficial detention sites, and ensure accountability for those responsible.

== Finance ==
Haftar was injured during clashes in Tripoli in 2012 following a failed attempt to control the Aman bank. Immediately after he recaptured Benghazi in December 2017, Haftar ordered his men to transfer about 160 million Euros, 639 million Libyan dinars, two million US dollars and 6,000 silver coins from the Central Bank branch in Benghazi to an unknown destination, which has been described as "one of the largest bank heists in history". In December 2022, Saddam Haftar attempted to seize control of banking institutions in Cyrenaica. Saddam's strong control over eastern Libya's banking sector would allow him to finance his forces, equipment and operations.

A dual Libyan-American citizen, Saddam Haftar, along with his brother Khalid Haftar, owns a total of 17 properties in Virginia, United States — where he previously lived for years — collectively worth at least $8 million. In February 2020, a lawsuit was filed against Saddam, Khalid, and their father, accusing them of torturing two families to death as members of the Libyan National Army, potentially jeopardizing their Virginia properties.

== Politics ==
On 1 November 2021, Haftar reportedly visited Tel Aviv for a secret meeting with Israeli officials, allegedly seeking to establish diplomatic relations in return for Israeli "military and diplomatic assistance." It is unknown whom he met there, and Libya and Israel currently have no diplomatic relations.

Later that same month, Haftar allegedly guaranteed the safety of Saif al-Islam Gaddafi and Bashir Saleh to register themselves as presidential candidates in Sabha.

Ten days later, the Tariq Ben Zeyad Brigade, led by Saddam and Khalid, stormed the courthouse in Sabha to prevent judges from hearing Saif al-Islam Gaddafi's appeal to participate in the presidential election. The gunmen used arms against the staffers and judges and then kicked them out. In January 2023, Khalifa Haftar pledged to withdraw from the Libyan presidential election on the condition that his sons Saddam and Belqasim are allowed to run. Saddam Haftar is seen as the heir apparent of Khalifa Haftar.

On 28 April 2025, Saddam, as the envoy of Libyan National Army commander Khalifa Haftar, met in Washington D.C. with Massad Boulos, senior advisor to U.S. President Donald Trump, and other senior Republican officials, focusing on advancing U.S. interests to achieve "a secure, unified, and prosperous Libya." He possibly agreed to a deal with the United States to deport immigrants from the U.S. to Libya.

There were reports that on September 29, 2026, when Benjamin Netanyahu landed in Abu Dhabi, he held a covert meeting with Saddam Haftar.

=== Arrest warrant ===
In August 2024, Spain issued an arrest warrant for Saddam Haftar while he was returning to Libya from Italy, alleging that he was involved in smuggling a shipment of weapons, destined for the United Arab Emirates, that was intercepted by Spanish police several months earlier. Various Western powers began pressuring Spain to nullify its arrest warrant for Saddam Haftar. Saddam Haftar was reportedly detained for questioning at an airport in Naples for an hour after his name appeared on a common EU database.
