= Seham Sergiwa =

Libyan psychologist and politician

- سهام سرقيوة
- Born: 1963 (age 62–63); Kingdom of Libya
- Disappeared: 17 July 2019; Benghazi, Libya
- Status: Missing for 7 years, 1 month and 23 days
- Occupation: Psychologist
- Known for: Documenting rape as a weapon of war during the 2011 Libyan Civil War and publicly speaking against Khalifa Haftar war.

Member of the Libya Parliament for Benghazi
- Incumbent
- Assumed office 2014
- Majority: 5,883

Seham Sergiwa (Arabic: سهام سرقيوة Sahām Sarqīwa; also Romanized Siham, Sirqiwa, Sergewa, Sirghua; born 1963) is a Libyan psychologist elected to the Libyan parliament in 2014. She was abducted by a Libyan National Army militia loyal to Khalifa Haftar on 17 July 2019. The United Nations Support Mission in Libya expressed its deep concern and stated that "silencing the voices of women in decision-making positions [would] not be tolerated."

As of 15 September 2025, Sergiwa's fate and whereabouts were unknown. The "authorities in eastern Libya" had not made public the results of any investigation as of October 2019.

== Research career ==
Sergiwa is a psychologist who received her doctorate in clinical psychology in 1998 at King's College London, University of London for a thesis titled, "The effect of situation on children's response to assessment of hyperactivity." She lived in London until the late 2000s, working as a psychologist with patients and in research at Guy's Hospital.

In 2011, Sergiwa investigated the use of rape as a weapon of war during the 2011 Libyan Civil War. She documented 300 rapes during the war and estimates that 6,000 women were raped in total in the conflict. She stated that five of Muammar Gaddafi's personal women bodyguards were raped and sexually abused by Gaddafi, and "then passed onto senior officials as sexual playthings". She found that pro-government soldiers were given Viagra and condoms in order to encourage them to carry out rapes. Sergiwa's investigative methods included travelling to refugee camps on the borders with Tunisia and Egypt; distributing questionnaires to the refugees and receiving 50,000 responses. All the rape claims were attributed to government soldiers. Reports on gang rapes included women being held for several days and being raped by up to 15 men. Sergiwa's documentation was provided to the International Criminal Court investigation in Libya.

== Member of parliament ==
Sergiwa was elected with 5,883 votes, third out of the women candidates for Benghazi, with more votes than the most popular man, in the 2014 Libyan parliamentary election. This was described as a revolutionary step for Libya, as few women held power in Libya during the preceding decades. As of July 2019, she was considered to be one of the most prominent Libyan politicians fighting for democracy and equal rights.

== Disappearance ==
Sergiwa's home was invaded at about 01:30am on 17 July 2019 by 25–30 masked, uniformed members of the 106th Brigade of the Libyan National Army, a unit also known as Awlia Aldem (Arabic: أوليء الدم), headed by Khalifa Haftar's son Khaled. Electricity was cut to the region, and army vehicles flooded the region to prevent any family member's escape or Benghazi police arrival. Sergiwa's husband was shot in the legs and one of her sons, a fourteen-year-old boy, was beaten by the 106th Brigade forces. Both were hospitalized and prevented from being visited by family members. A guard was placed to keep them in the hospital. The security forces graffitied "Don't cross the line of the armies" on the house walls, issuing a warning to all those who want to speak out against Haftar. Sergiwa was abducted.

On 3 August, Noman Benotman, a former fighter of the Libyan Islamic Fighting Group living in the United Kingdom, claimed that Sergiwa had been killed on the first day of her abduction by the Awliaa al-Dam brigade loyal to the LNA.

=== Reactions ===
The Libyan House of Representatives issued a statement holding Haftar "legally and morally" responsible for the detention and "for jeopardizing her life". The United Nations Support Mission in Libya (UNSMIL) stated on 18 July that "Enforced disappearance, unlawful arrest and abduction based on political views or affiliations constitute a serious blow to the rule of law and blatant violations of international humanitarian and human rights law" in response to the detention and disappearance and that "Silencing the voices of women in decision-making position will not be tolerated."

Media around the world reported Sergiwa's detention and disappearance, including NBC, CNN, Thomson Reuters, Associated Press, The Washington Post, The New York Times, Al Jazeera, BBC Arabic, Libya Al Ahrar TV, and Libya Akhbar.

On 7 August, UNSMIL stated that it was "highly concerned about the safety and security of Ms. Sergewa and stresses that the relevant authorities are responsible for the safety and security of the people under their territorial control including in this case of prolonged enforced disappearance." UNSMIL stated that "silencing the voices of women in decision-making positions [would] not be tolerated and [reiterated] its strong commitment to support the crucial role Libyan women play in peacemaking and peacebuilding and their full participation and involvement in the country's political life and decision-making". On 4 September, Ghassan Salamé, head of UNSMIL, again called for "the authorities in the east" to investigate Sergiwa's disappearance and to publish the results. He stated that many international governments had given "continued and loud support ... demanding Ms. Sergewa's swift return." On 17 October 2019, UNSMIL again called on the Haftar-controlled authorities to locate Sergiwa or her body and to hold those responsible for the kidnapping legally accountable.

== Points of view ==
According to Madrid-based academic Barah Mikail, Sergiwa is "an independent person, which is why all sides of the Libyan conflict got angry with her at some point" and she is "against anything that stood in the way of building or consolidating the country's interests and the Libyan nation." In an interview a few hours before she was detained, she criticised Haftar's 2019 attack on Tripoli and stated that "even the extremists, on either side, have the right to participate" in a unity government involving all sides in the conflict.

== See also ==
- Elections in Libya
- Libyan Civil War (2014–present)
