= Ryan Goodman =

Lawyer

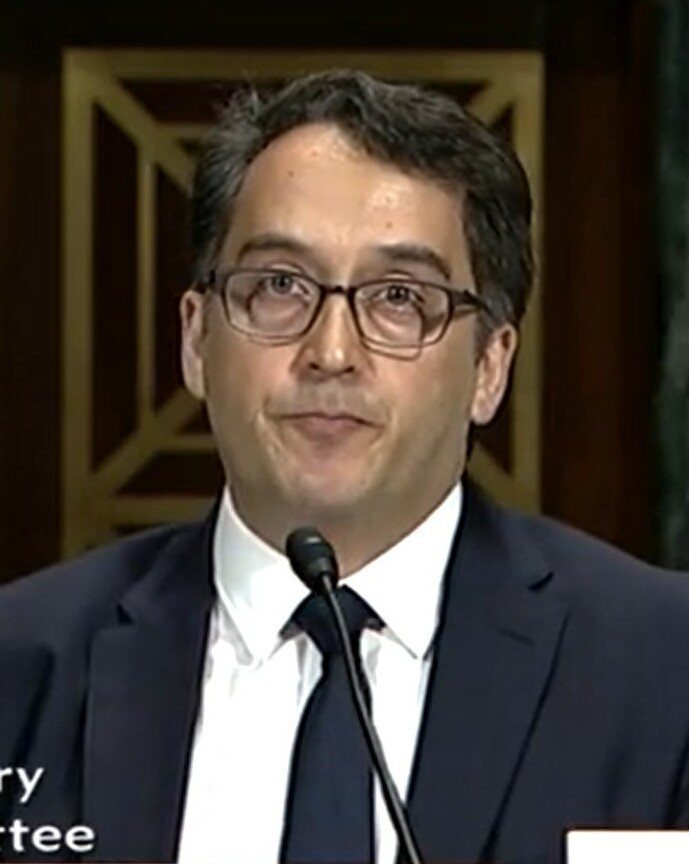
- Goodman in 2018
- Born: Johannesburg, South Africa

Academic background
- Education: University of Texas at Austin (BA); Yale University (PhD, JD)

Academic work
- Discipline: Legal scholar
- Sub-discipline: International law
- Institutions: New York University School of Law, Harvard Law School
- Website: http://ryangoodman.us/

Ryan Goodman is an American legal scholar who is the Anne and Joel Ehrenkranz Professor of Law at NYU School of Law and is the founding co-editor-in-chief of its website Just Security, which focuses on U.S. national security law and policy. Goodman joined the NYU faculty in 2009.

Prior to moving to NYU, Goodman was the inaugural Rita E. Hauser Professor of Human Rights and Humanitarian Law and Director of the Human Rights Program at Harvard Law School. He joined the faculty of Harvard Law School in 2002 and received tenure at Harvard in 2006.

== Education ==
Goodman received his B.A. in government, political science, and philosophy from the University of Texas at Austin in 1993. He earned a J.D. from Yale Law School in 1999 and a Ph.D. in sociology from Yale University in 2001.

== Legal career ==
Following law school, Goodman clerked for Judge Stephen Reinhardt of the United States Court of Appeals for the Ninth Circuit.

In a phase of his career prior to 2018, Goodman held the role of "special counsel to the general counsel" of the United States Department of Defense.

== Publications ==
Books:

- (2013). Socializing States: Promoting Human Rights Through International Law (Oxford University Press) (with Derek Jinks).
- (2011). Human Rights, State Compliance, and Social Change: Assessing National Human Rights Institutions (Cambridge University Press, 2011) (ed. with Thomas Pegram).
- (2012). Understanding Social Action, Promoting Human Rights (Oxford University Press, 2012) (with Derek Jinks & Andrew K. Woods).
- (2007). International Human Rights In Context 3d ed. (Oxford University Press) (with Philip Alston & Henry Steiner).

Articles:

- (2017). Many think this law is obsolete. It could actually be a big problem for Trump. (about the Logan Act)
- (2013). The Power to Kill or Capture Enemy Combatants, 24 European Journal of International Law.
- (2013). Social Mechanisms to Promote International Human Rights: Complementary or Contradictory?, in From Commitment to Compliance: the Persistent Power of Human Rights (Thomas Risse, Stephen C. Ropp, and Kathryn Sikkink, eds.) (Cambridge University Press) (with Derek Jinks).
- (2012). Psychic Numbing and Mass Atrocity in The Behavioral Foundations of Policy (Eldar Shafir, ed) (Princeton University Press) (with Derek Jinks, Paul Slovic, Andrew K. Woods, and David Zionts).
- (2012). Asylum and the Concealment of Sexual Orientation: Where Not to Draw the Line, 44 NYU Journal of International Law 407.
- (2009). Acculturation and International Human Rights Law: Toward a More Complete Theoretical Model, 20 European Journal of International Law 443.
- (2009). Controlling the Recourse to War by Modifying Jus in Bello, 53 Yearbook of International Humanitarian Law.
- (2009). Rationales for Detention: Security Threats and Intelligence Value, 85 INTERNATIONAL LAW STUDIES (Naval War College).
- (2009). The Detention of Civilians in Armed Conflict, 48American Journal of International Law.
- (2008). Incomplete Internalization and Compliance with Human Rights Law, 19 European Journal of International Law 725 (Oxford University Press) (with Derek Jinks).
- (2006). Humanitarian Intervention and Pretexts for War, 100 American Journal of International Law 107.
- (2005). International Law and State Socialization: Conceptual, Empirical, and Normative Challenges, 54 Duke Law Journal 983 (with Derek Jinks)
- (2005). International Law, U.S. War Powers, and the Global War on Terror, 118 Harvard Law Review 2653 (with Derek Jinks).
- (2005). International Institutions and the Mechanisms of War, 99 American Journal of International Law 507.
- (2004). How to Influence States: Socialization and International Human Rights Law, 54 Duke Law Journal 621 (with Derek Jinks).
- (2004). The Difference Law Makes: Research Design, Institutional Design, and Human Rights, 98 American Society of International Law Proceedings 198.
- (2004). U.S. Civil Litigation and International Terrorism, in CIVIL LITIGATION AGAINST TERRORISM (with Jack Goldsmith).
- (2003). Toward an Institutional Theory of Sovereignty, 55 Stanford Law Review 1749 (with Derek Jinks).
- (2003). Measuring the Effects of Human Rights Treaties, 13 European Journal of International Law 171 (Oxford University Press) (with Derek Jinks).
- (2002). Human Rights Treaties, Invalid Reservations, and State Consent, 96 American Journal of International Law 531.
- (2001). Beyond the Enforcement Principle: Sodomy Laws, Social Norms, and Social Panoptics, 89 California Law Review 643.
- (2001). Norms and National Security: The WTO as a Catalyst for Inquiry, 2 Chicago Journal of International Law 101.
- (1997). Filartiga's Firm Footing: International Human Rights and Federal Common Law, 66 Fordham Law Review 463 (with Derek Jinks).
- (1997). Gender Blindness and the Hunter Doctrine, 105 Yale Law Journal 261.
- (1995). The Incorporation of International Human Rights Standards into Sexual Orientation Asylum Claims, 105 Yale Law Journal 255.

Newsletter:

In April 2025, Goodman launched a newsletter on Substack that will provide free and paid subscribers with updates from a website similarly entitled, Just Security. The newsletter is described as a litigation tracker for busy readers and presents a graphic tool that will be updated to follow all of the litigation resulting from executive orders being issued in high volume by the current presidential administration.
