= Wadi Ghan Dam =

- Location within Libya
- Country: Libya
- Location: Gharyan
- Coordinates: 32°14′39″N 13°08′09″E
- Status: Operational
- Opening date: 1982

Dam and spillways
- Impounds: Wadi Al-Hira
- Height: 85 m (279 ft)
- Length: 325 m (1,066 ft)

Reservoir
- Total capacity: 30,000,000 m^{3} (24,321 acre⋅ft)

The Wadi Ghan Dam is a rock-fill embankment dam located on Wadi Al-Hira, 14 km (9 mi) northeast of Gharyan in the Jabal al Gharbi District of Libya. Completed in 1982, the primary purpose of the dam is water supply for irrigation.
