= Maria do Valle Ribeiro =

Portuguese diplomat

Maria do Valle Ribeiro or Maria Ribeiro (born 1957 (age 68–69) in Portugal) is a United Nations diplomat. On 8 November 2016 she was appointed as the United Nations Deputy Special Representative and Deputy Head of the United Nations Support Mission in Libya (UNSMIL).

== Education ==
Do Valle Ribeiro graduated from the University of Wales with a Master of Science in economic development policy and planning.

== Career ==
Do Valle Ribeiro has held many positions as a United Nations representative. She was the United Nations Resident Coordinator in Angola. She was later the United Nations Deputy Special Representative in Guinea-Bissau.

From 2008 to 2010 she was the United Nations Resident Coordinator in Mauritania. She has held several positions with UNICEF in Africa, Guyana, Suriname and Trinidad and Tobago.

On 8 November 2016 she was appointed as the United Nations Deputy Special Representative and Deputy Head of the United Nations Support Mission in Libya (UNSMIL). In May 2019 during the 2019 Western Libya Offensive, she stated that the 18 May militia attack on the Great Man-Made River project, which supplies most of Tripoli's water, could constitute a war crime.
