= 106th Brigade (Libya) =

- Active: 2018
- Country: Libya
- Allegiance: House of Representatives
- Branch: Libyan National Army
- Size: Brigade
- Engagements: Battle of Derna (2018–2019); Western Libya campaign (2019)

The 106th Brigade (or Awlia Aldem, Arabic: أوليء الدم) is a military unit of the Libyan National Army, loyal to Field marshal Khalifa Haftar. It was established as a brigade in 2018.

== History ==
The 106th Battalion was created in 2016, from militias serving as Haftar's personal guard in 2014. It became the 106th Brigade in 2018, through incorporation of various other units.

The 106th Battalion first saw combat in the 2018 Battle of Derna.

The brigade participated in the capture of Sabha in January 2019. It fought in the failed Tripoli offensive, beginning hostilities on the night of April 4 by seizing a checkpoint between Tripoli and Zawiya. The brigade then performed poorly in the offensive around Zawiya. Many of the brigade's soldiers were captured by the Government of National Accord forces.

On 17 July 2019, according to witnesses cited by The Independent and a family member cited by CNN, 25–30 masked, uniformed 106th Brigade members abducted member of the Libyan House of Representatives Seham Sergiwa in Benghazi.

In May 2022, the 106th Brigade was deployed to the Chad–Libya border.

== Commander ==
The 106th Battalion was commanded by Haftar's son, Saddam. He was replaced by his brother Khalid. Major General Salem Rahil took command in mid-2019 but Khalid Haftar remains the de facto leader of the unit.

== Equipment and fighters ==
Due to its link with Haftar's family, the Brigade has received much modern equipment, such as Emirati Nimr and Jordanian Al-Wahsh APCs, and Kornet ATGM. It also received TAG Terrier LT-79 APCs in December 2019.

The Brigade is more professional than previous units of the LNA. The brigade received officers from the new NLA military academy. However, the induction of poorly trained recruits in 2019 reduced the military potential of the brigade.

== Composition ==
- 101st Battalion
- 123rd Battalion
- 126th Battalion
- 155th Battalion
- 166th Battalion
- 192nd Battalion
- 208th Battalion
- 214th Tank Battalion
- 270th Battalion
- 322nd Artillery Battalion
