= Abdullah Naker =

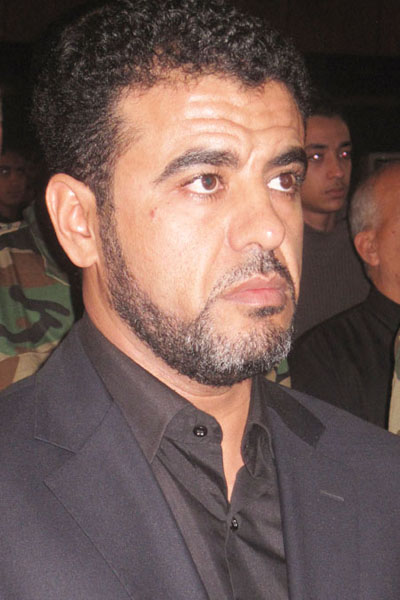
Abdullah Naker

Abdullah Naker (also al-Zintani; Arabic: عبد الله ناكر, romanized: ʻAbd Allāh Nākir; born 1971 or 1972 in Zintan, Libya) is the head of the Tripoli Revolutionist Council (TRC).

Naker reissued cars in Tripoli. During the Libyan Civil War he quit his job to join the uprising in his hometown of Zintan. He is seen as an influential commander from the Zintan brigade.

On 2 October 2011, he announced the creation of an armed group, the Tripoli Revolutionists Council, to keep order in Tripoli. Analysts said such a mission would overlap with the existing Tripoli Military Council (TMC) which is led by Abdelhakim Belhadj. Naker said his forces had 22,000 armed men at its disposal and were in control of 75 percent of the capital. He stated his TRC was working under the auspices of Mustafa Abdel Jalil and was “cooperating” with the TMC.

On 18 November, a few days before Abdurrahim El-Keib presented his government, Naker said in an interview that his men could overthrow the government even before it was appointed if it failed to meet their demands for representation.

On 1 January 2012 he said he would launch a political party.
