= Khalifa Haftar =

Libyan politician, Field Marshal, leader of the LNA (born 1943)

Field Marshal Khalifa Haftar
- خليفة حفتر
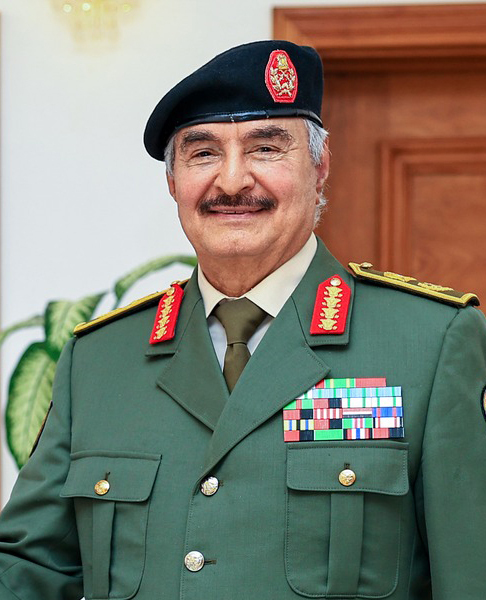
- Haftar in 2023

Military Leader of Eastern Libya (Note: Government of National Stability) De facto
- Incumbent
- Assumed office c. March 2015 to March 2017
- President: Aguila Saleh Issa; Mohamed al-Menfi
- Prime Minister: Abdullah al-Thani; Abdul Hamid Dbeibeh; Fathi Bashagha; Osama Hammad (a.i.)
- Preceded by: Aguila Saleh Issa (Head of State of Libya as the Speaker of the House of Representatives of Libya)

Supreme Commander of the Libyan National Army
- Incumbent
- Assumed office 2 March 2015
- Deputy: Saddam Haftar
- Preceded by: Position established

Personal details
- Born: Khalifa Belqasim Omar Haftar; 7 November 1943 (age 83) Ajdabiya, Libya (Note: Libya was under British occupation at the time of Haftar's birth.)
- Citizenship: Libya; United States
- Children: 6, including Saddam
- Awards: Red diploma (high honours) – M.V. Frunze Military Academy

Military service
- Allegiance: State of Libya (House of Representatives) (since 2011); National Front for the Salvation of Libya (1987–2011); Socialist People's Libyan Arab Jamahiriya (1977–1987); Libyan Arab Republic (1969–1977); Kingdom of Libya (1966–1969)
- Branch/service: Libyan National Army
- Years of service: 1966–1987; 2011–present
- Rank: Field Marshal
- Commands: Libyan National Army
- Battles: Yom Kippur War; Chadian–Libyan War; First Libyan Civil War; Battle of Ajdabiya; Third Battle of Brega; Battle of Sabha; Second Libyan Civil War; Battle of Benghazi; Battle of Benina Airport; Western Libya campaign; Battle of Sirte
- Criminal information
- Status: Void
- Conviction: Treason against Muammar Gaddafi
- Trial: Trial in absentia
- Penalty: Capital punishment
- Wanted by: Great Socialist People's Libyan Arab Jamahiriya
- Wanted since: 1993
- Criminal information
- Status: Released from prison
- Conviction: POW
- Penalty: 3 years in prison
- Wanted by: Chad
- Wanted since: 1978–1987

Khalifa Haftar (Arabic: خليفة حفتر, romanized: Ḵalīfa Ḥaftar; born 7 November 1943) (Note: Also transliterated as Hifter and Hiftar.) is a Libyan politician, military officer, and the commander of the Tobruk-based Libyan National Army (LNA). A prominent officer for the Libyan Arab Republic and its successor, the Libyan Arab Jamahiriya, from 1969 to 1987, he has been a major figure of the Libyan crisis since 2011. In 2015, he was appointed commander of the armed forces loyal to the elected legislative body, the Libyan House of Representatives. Haftar has been the de facto ruler of the eastern part of Libya since early 2017, governing the region as a military dictatorship under the LNA. (Note: A nominal civilian government, currently the Government of National Stability led by Osama Hammad, operates in the region but has limited authority, with de facto control held by Haftar and his LNA.)

Haftar was born in Ajdabiya. He served in the Libyan Army under Muammar Gaddafi, and took part in the coup that brought Gaddafi to power in 1969. He participated in the Libyan contingent against Israel in the Yom Kippur War of 1973. Haftar then participated in the Chadian-Libyan war (1978–1987), becoming promoted to Chief officer of the Libyan military in Chad in 1986 for the final phase of the conflict, known as the Toyota War, until he was captured by Chadian forces in April 1987 and held as a prisoner of war, which was seen as a major embarrassment for Gaddafi and represented a major blow to Gaddafi's ambitions in Chad. While being held prisoner, he and his fellow officers formed a group hoping to overthrow Gaddafi. He was released around 1990 in a deal with the United States government and spent nearly two decades living in the U.S. in Langley, Virginia, and gained U.S. citizenship. In 1993, while living in the United States, he was convicted in absentia in Libya, of crimes against the Great Socialist People's Libyan Arab Jamahiriya, and sentenced to death.

Haftar held a senior position in the forces that overthrew Gaddafi in 2011, during the First Libyan Civil War. In 2014, he was commander of the Libyan Army when the General National Congress (GNC) refused to give up power. Haftar launched a campaign against the GNC and its Islamic fundamentalist allies. His campaign allowed elections to replace the GNC but then developed into the Second Libyan Civil War. In 2017, Ramzi al-Shaeri, vice-president of the Derna city council and lawyers Ryan Goodman and Alex Whiting accused Haftar of the war crime of ordering the killing of prisoners of war during the recapture of Derna. Haftar has been described as "Libya's most potent warlord", having fought "with and against nearly every significant faction" in Libya's conflicts, as having a "reputation for unrivalled military experience" and as governing "with an iron fist". In November 2021, Haftar announced his candidacy for the presidential election in December 2021 before it was postponed.

Although Haftar is reportedly an anti-Islamist, his allies include the Salafi Madkhali militias for geopolitical purposes. Besides his native Arabic, Haftar also speaks English, Italian and Russian, and some French. He is a dual Libyan-US citizen; he is expected to renounce his US citizenship before the next Libyan election.

== Early life and education ==
Khalifa Belqasim Omar Haftar (Note: Arabic: خليفة بالقاسم عمر حفتر, romanized: Ḵalīfa Bilqāsim 'Umar Ḥaftar) was born in Ajdabiya in Cyrenaica, British-occupied Libya to an Arab Bedouin family belonging to the Firjan tribe. He studied at al-Huda School in Ajdabiya in 1957 and then moved to Derna to obtain his secondary education between 1961 and 1964. He joined the Benghazi Military University Academy (also known as Benghazi Royal Military College) on 16 September 1964 and graduated from there in 1966.

In the late 1970s, he went on to receive military training in the Soviet Union, completing a special three-year degree for foreign officers sent to study in the USSR, at the M. V. Frunze Military Academy. Haftar later pursued further military training in Egypt. He was also stationed with the artillery corps.

== Early years in the Gaddafi government ==
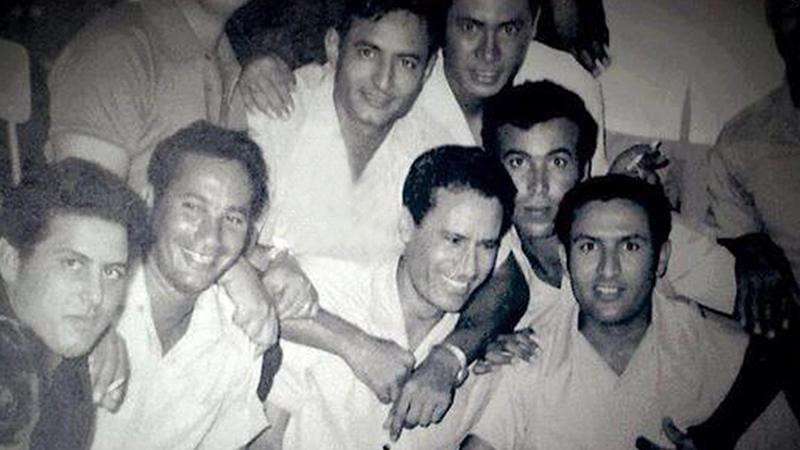
Haftar with his arms around Muammar Gaddafi shortly after the 1969 Libyan coup d'état

As a young army officer, Haftar took part in the coup that brought Muammar Gaddafi to power in 1969, assisting Gaddafi in the overthrow of Libya's King Idris. Shortly thereafter, Haftar became a top military officer for Gaddafi. He commanded Libyan troops supporting Egyptian troops entering Israeli-occupied Sinai during the Yom Kippur War in 1973.

Like other members of the Free Officers movement (the junta that toppled the monarchy), Haftar was known as a secularist and a Nasserist. He was a member of the Revolutionary Command Council which governed Libya in the immediate aftermath of the coup. Haftar later became Gaddafi's military Chief of staff. In the late 1980s, Haftar commanded Libyan forces during the Chadian–Libyan conflict, which ended in defeat for Libya.

== War with Chad ==
By 1986, Haftar had attained the rank of colonel, and was then the Chief officer in command of Gaddafi's military forces in Chad in the Chadian–Libyan conflict. During the war, in which the Libyan forces were either captured or driven back across the border, Haftar and 600–700 of his men were captured as prisoners of war, and incarcerated in 1987 after their defeat in the Ouadi Doum airstrike.

Shortly after this disastrous battle, Gaddafi disavowed Haftar and the other Libyan prisoners of war who were captured by Chad. One possible contributing factor to Gaddafi's repudiation of Haftar and of other captured prisoners of war may have been the fact that Gaddafi had earlier signed an agreement to withdraw all Libyan forces from Chad, and Haftar's operations inside of Chad had been in violation of this agreement. Another possible reason given for Gaddafi's abandonment of Haftar was the potential that Haftar might return to Libya as a hero and thus pose a threat to Gaddafi's rule itself.

In 1986 and 1987 the Government of Chad accused Libya of using toxic gas and napalm against central government forces and against rebel forces. Libya may have used mustard gas delivered in bombs by An-26 aircraft in final phases of the war against Chad in September 1987.

== As Libyan opposition alongside the United States ==
Gaddafi demanded Haftar's soldiers be returned to Libya, but the Americans arranged for them to fly to Zaire instead. There, half of his soldiers decided to return to Libya. In late 1987, Haftar and a group of officers aligned themselves with the National Front for the Salvation of Libya (NFSL), a U.S. supported opposition group.

On 21 June 1988, he declared the establishment of the military wing of the NFSL, called the Libyan National Army under his leadership. When U.S. financial aid to Zaire was not forthcoming, Zaire expelled the remainder to Kenya. Kenya only provided temporary residence, and the CIA negotiated a settlement around 1990, enabling Haftar and 300 of his soldiers to move to the United States under the U.S. refugee programme. In fact, the end of the Cold War diminished Libya's geo-strategic relevance and the CIA funding program to Haftar's brigade was suspended.

In March 1996, Haftar took part in a failed uprising against Gaddafi in the mountains of eastern Libya, before returning to the U.S.

Haftar moved to suburban area outside Washington, D.C., living in Falls Church, Virginia until 2007. He then moved to a five-bedroom house in Vienna, Virginia. He voted in Virginian elections in 2008 and 2009. From there, and mostly through his close contacts within the DIA / CIA, he consistently supported several attempts to topple and assassinate Gaddafi. He spelled his name "Hifter" in legal documents in the United States.

== Early role in the First Libyan Civil War ==
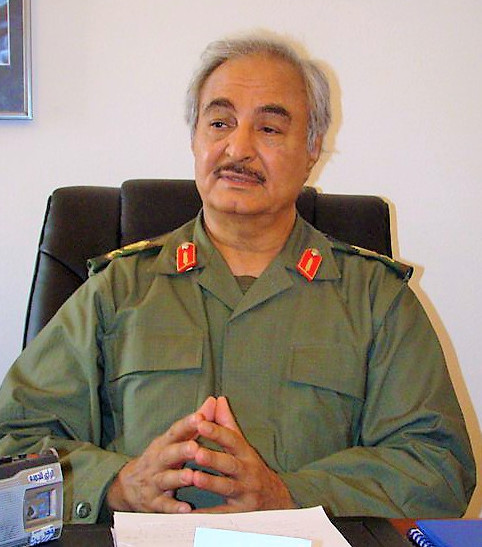
Haftar in April 2011

In 2011, he returned to Libya at the onset of the Libyan Crisis, to support the anti-Gaddafi forces in the First Libyan Civil War. In March, a military spokesperson announced that Haftar had been appointed commander of the military, but the National Transitional Council denied this. By April, Abdul Fatah Younis held the role of commander-in-chief of the Armed Forces, Omar El-Hariri was serving as Younis's Chief of Staff, and Haftar had assumed the third most senior position as the commander of ground forces with the rank of lieutenant-general. Younis was assassinated later that summer.

On 17 November 2011, Haftar was chosen as the overall commander of the new Libyan Army due to his military experience and loyalty to the revolution that overthrew Gaddafi.

== Launch of Operation Dignity ==
In February 2014, Haftar appeared in a televised announcement to reveal that the General National Congress (GNC), the elected parliament which had recently unilaterally extended its mandate, had been dissolved. Haftar called for a caretaker government to oversee new elections, and urged Libyans to revolt against the GNC, the mandate of which was still in force at the time. Ultimately, his appeal did not lead to a general uprising due to the substantial lack of resources and local support for his initiative. His announcement was soon dismissed with great skepticism by the then acting Prime Minister Ali Zeidan. Haftar's actions were condemned as a "coup attempt" and "ridiculous".

Haftar's strategy was to embark on a series of "town hall" meetings around Libya and, with the support of fellow ex-officers from the military, to secretly build an army. Three months later on 16 May in Operation Dignity, Haftar began a combined air and ground assault against the pro-Islamic militias of Benghazi, as well as a sustained heavy weapons attack against the Libyan parliament. At the time of the Benghazi assault, Haftar, who had already been the target of assassination attempts, reportedly explained to a friend that he was fully aware of the personal safety risks involved in his actions. On 20 May 2014, four days after the Benghazi assault, the GNC announced that it had finally scheduled the long postponed national elections that were to replace the then-interim legislature (the Tripoli-based GNC) with the Tobruk-based House of Representatives. These elections were scheduled for 25 June 2014.

Later in May, after having been ousted from office by the GNC, Ali Zeidan endorsed Operation Dignity, as did 40 members of parliament, the heads of the navy and the air-force, and much of the army. On 4 June 2014, a suicide car bomber detonated his vehicle at Haftar's residence at Ghut al-Sultan near Abayar, east of Benghazi, killing four people and injuring at least three others. Haftar was not injured in the attack.

In eastern Libya, Haftar's air and ground forces remained in place and seemed to be gaining general support. Over the course of May and June, numerous pro–Operation Dignity marches were held throughout Libya, and in the 25 June parliamentary elections the secularists gained a clear mandate over and against the Islamist agenda. Meanwhile, despite its initial denouncement of Operation Dignity in May, Prime Minister Abdullah al-Thani's administration subsequently refrained from further official endorsement or denouncement of Haftar's Operation Dignity. However, the newly elected parliament branded Haftar's enemies "terrorists".

On 24 November 2014 and the following day, warplanes affiliated with Operation Dignity forces attacked Mitiga International Airport in Tripoli, temporarily shutting down the airport, but also damaging nearby houses. In response to the attack on Mitiga, a court in Tripoli issued an arrest warrant for Khalifa Haftar.

== Leading role in the Second Libyan Civil War ==
Haftar was officially made commander of the Libyan National Army (LNA) by the internationally recognized House of Representatives on 2 March 2015. The Libyan armed forces split up later in the year into the LNA under Haftar's control, which are often supported by Russia and Wagner, and the Libyan Army controlled by the Government of National Accord (GNA).

As of August 2016, Haftar had refused to support the new United Nations Security Council endorsed Government of National Accord, which led the United States and allies to believe that he was jeopardizing the stability of Libya. Libya specialist and RUSI Senior Research Fellow Alison Pargeter pointed out that Haftar may plausibly be regarded as the "biggest single obstacle to peace in Libya" in that he allegedly fears that cooperating with the GNA may lead to the end of his influence in eastern Libya.

The United Arab Emirates and Egypt continue to support Haftar. Middle East Eye has reported that British, French, U.S. and United Arab Emirates air forces have assisted Haftar's forces, after analyzing leaked air traffic control recordings. According to the Guardian, Egypt's Sisi openly displays unequivocal support for Haftar bombarding Tripoli. He also receives private support by the leaders of Saudi Arabia and the United Arab Emirates for the assault on Tripoli.

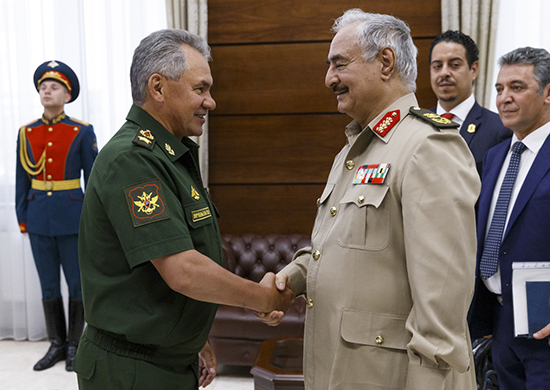
Haftar meets Russian defense minister Sergei Shoigu in August 2017

In November 2016, Haftar made a second trip to Russia to meet with Foreign Minister Sergey Lavrov and Defense Minister Sergei Shoigu. It was reported that while he was seeking weapons and Russia's backing, Russia was holding off pending the new Trump Administration. On 26 December, it was reported that Russia had thrown its weight behind Haftar, saying he must have a role in the leadership of Libya.

Russia has since then treated wounded LNA soldiers, printed Libyan dinars for the Tobruk-based government, and signed exclusive agreements that will allow the Russian government to establish two additional military bases in eastern Libya. Global risk experts Giorgio Cafiero and Daniel Wagner recently observed that "Moscow appears to view Haftar – not the weak UN/Western-backed government – as the only realistic bulwark against extremism in post-Gaddafi Libya."

After three years of military campaigns, in early July 2017 Haftar announced in a televised speech that his forces had finally taken full control of Benghazi, the second largest Libyan city. Haftar's military victory has been regarded by many as the expression of his growing military and political ambitions, and especially of his intention to secure military control over critical areas in eastern Libya. Some of his critics claimed that he deliberately dragged his militias through years of fighting against diverse groups which he framed as Islamist enemies in order to consolidate a future political role through his military leadership.

Furthermore, experts have questioned whether the LNA could establish its control over the entire national territory, or whether Haftar would allow any military or elected political leader other than himself to guide a national army or government should that opportunity materialize in the future through a new general election.

Similarly, while some have celebrated Haftar's role in unifying and successfully leading the fight against the Islamic State, several sources have claimed that Haftar's role in the fighting of ISIS has been largely overstated or motivated by self-serving calculus. For instance, as of early 2016 Haftar's forces were reported to have bombed an Islamist group known as the Shura Council of Mujahideen in Derna who was behind the successful ouster of IS from Derna.

Haftar remains resolute that one of the aims of Operation Dignity is to completely dismantle the Libyan branch of the Muslim Brotherhood, as well as what he considers to be any other Islamist terrorist organizations within Libya. However, in recent years journalists and critics have observed that, in spite of his formal anti-Islamism mission, Haftar has continuously cooperated with Salafi organizations based in eastern Libya. His ties to these groups have produced a mutually beneficial partnership in the administration of the areas controlled by Haftar's forces as well as in the military fight against their Islamist counterpart, especially against the Muslim Brotherhood and Ansar al-Sharia. Some of the Salafi groups allied with Haftar were part of the militias based in Barqa that have fought under his leadership and eventually spread in Benghazi, Jabal al-Akhdar, and Ajdabiya. As Ahmed Salah Ali emphasized in his June 2017 report published by the Atlantic Council, Haftar needs the Salafi support due to his lack of troops and resources on the ground, while his Salafi allies have greatly benefited from their control over religious discourse and their growing military strength in eastern Libya, which have led to an increase in their appeal to unemployed youth.

On 5 November 2017, a former commander in the ranks of Operation Dignity and its former spokesperson, Mohammed Hijazi, described Khalifa Haftar as being "the main cause of the crisis that is crippling the country." Having left Operation Dignity in January 2016 citing corrupt leadership, Hijazi has since spoken out against Haftar, calling him a "tyrant" and describing "his killings, kidnappings, destruction, and forced disappearances." As a former commander and spokesman for the Operation, Mohammed Hijazi claims to have knowledge that Haftar is deliberately delaying the war, specifically in Benghazi. Hijazi concluded the recent interview by stating that his life is in great danger "especially as he is in possession of formal documents that could damage Dignity Operation forces and their leaders."

Military situation in the Libyan Civil War in 2020. Under the control of the Tobruk-led Government and Libyan National Army Under the control of the internationally-recognized government of Libya

On 4 April 2019, Haftar called on his military forces to advance on Tripoli, the capital of the internationally recognized government of Libya, in the 2019–20 Western Libya campaign This was met with reproach from United Nations Secretary General António Guterres and the United Nations Security Council.

On 7 April, eastern Libyan forces launched an airstrike on the southern part of Tripoli, the Bab al-Azizia military compound.

On 21 April, Haftar launched several airstrikes and explosions were launched over Tripoli. The GNA and eyewitnesses alleged about the use of drones. They said that a plane circled around for over ten minutes, before finally opening fire.

Following the huge military setbacks in June 2019, when his forces failed to seize Tripoli, Haftar ordered the LNA to target Turkish ships and companies, ban flights and arrest Turkish nationals in the country. After making these threats against Turkey, six Turkish civilians were kidnapped on a ship in Libya by the Libyan National Army on 1 July. The Turkish foreign ministry commented on the kidnappings saying "We expect our citizens to be released immediately. Otherwise, Haftar elements will become legitimate targets".

The Government of National Accord in June 2019 captured weapon systems in Libya's rebel compound, which included Javelin anti-tank missiles made by the US and labelled for the "armed forces of the United Arab Emirates" inside a wooden crate packaging. The four Javelin anti-tank missiles holding a value of more than $170,000 each, were found in a rebel base, reinforcing the army of Gen. Haftar.

The United Arab Emirates killed 8 civilians and wounded 27 on 18 November 2019. Emirates forces carried out a drone strike on a factory that makes food products in Wadi al-Rabie, Libya, south of Tripoli, a Human Rights Watch investigation found.

On 28 August 2020, a leading media site uncovered new evidence, which implicated the United Arab Emirates in a drone strike, where 26 unarmed cadets were hit and killed by a Chinese Blue Arrow 7 missile in January 2020 at a military academy in Libya's capital, Tripoli. The missiles were fired by a Wing Loong II drone, which were supplied by the Emirates and were operating from the UAE-controlled Al-Khadim air base.

In early April 2021, the Front for Change and Concord in Chad (FACT), which is based in Haftar's territories and has a nonaggression pact with him, launched a failed offensive to capture Chad. In the offensive, Chadian president Idris Déby was killed in action on the frontlines.

=== Haftar government ===
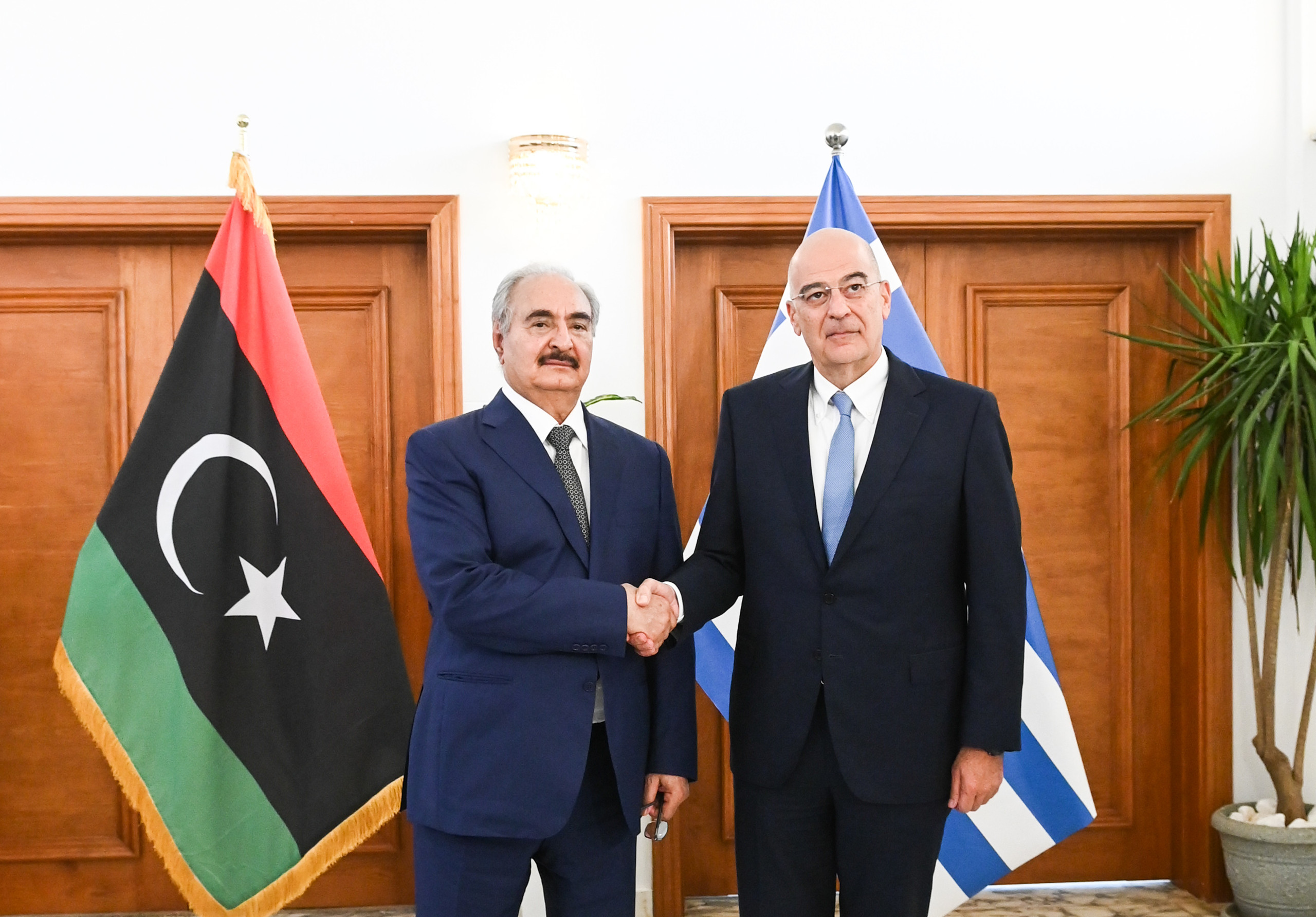
Haftar with Greek Foreign Minister Nikos Dendias on 17 November 2022

Haftar was the effective head of the de facto "Tobruk" government of much of the east and some of the south and west parts of Libya during the Second Libyan Civil War. The 2019 Libyan local elections were prevented from taking place on 27 April 2019, during his leadership, in Sabratha and Sorman. The head of the United Nations Support Mission in Libya (UNSMIL), Ghassan Salamé, described Haftar in April 2019 as "not a great democrat" (ce n'est pas un grand démocrate) and his methods of governance as "using an iron hand" (il gouverne avec une main de fer). During Haftar's Tobruk government, nine municipal councils out of 27 in total under the LNA's control were replaced by military administrators.

On 27 April 2020, Haftar made a televised address where he declared that the LNA would accept a popular mandate to govern Eastern Libya, making Haftar the de facto leader. Haftar's announcement raised the question of the outcome of the Libyan House of Representatives, who up until Haftar's announcement was the governing civilian government for areas controlled by the LNA.

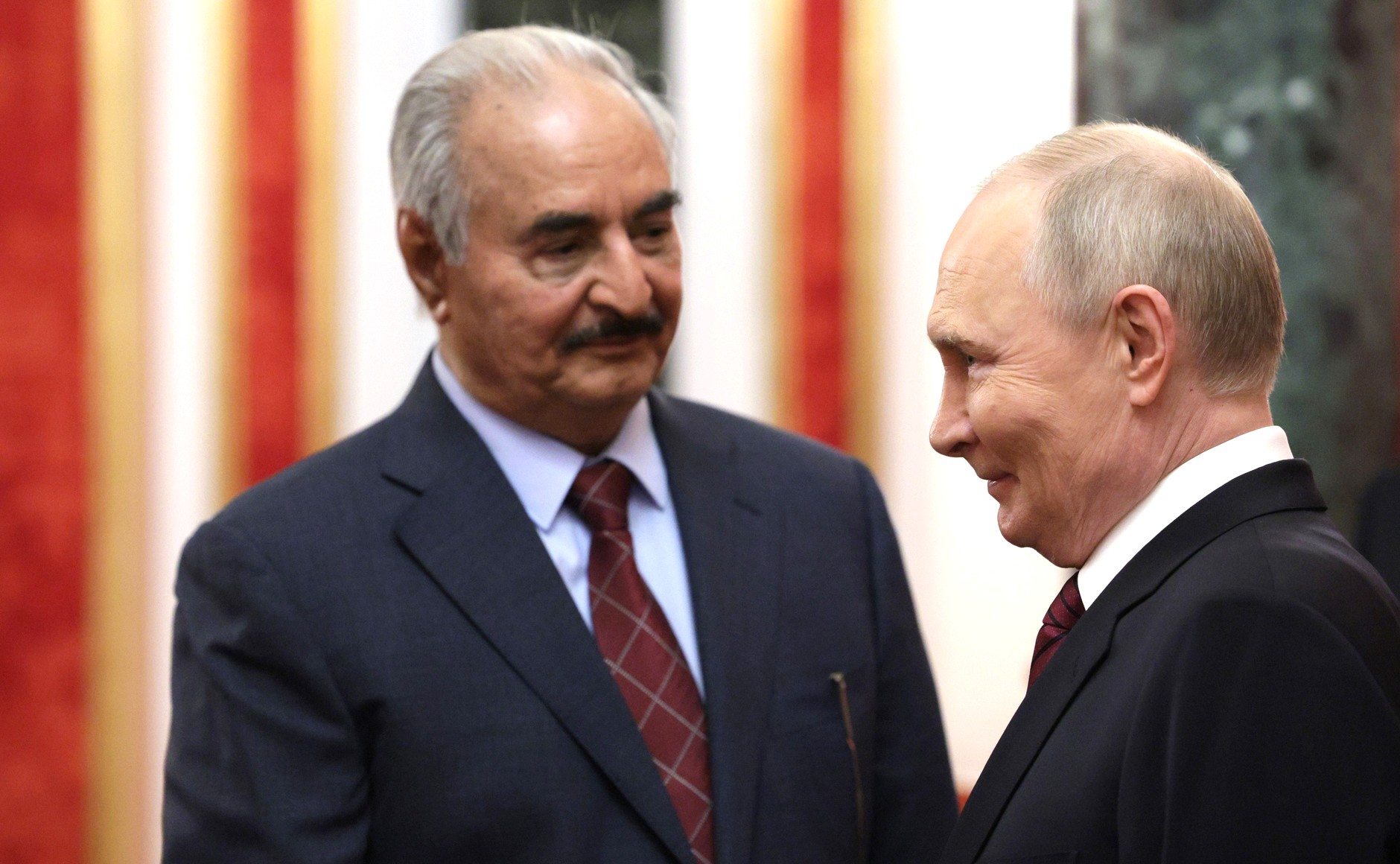
Haftar with Russian President Vladimir Putin in Moscow on 10 May 2025

On 23 September 2021, Haftar temporarily withdrew his post from the command of the LNA for a potential run in the 2021 Libyan general election, which was due to take place 23 December. Under Libyan law, officials must suspend their current work three months before participating in the election. The election has since been indefinitely postponed.

Haftar has been called a "Libyan oil magnate" by international press articles. The Libyan National Army under his leadership has controlled the oil terminals of Ras Lanuf and Es Sider since 2015. It is estimated that Haftar's forces have protected the production of Libyan crude oil, sometimes through forceful and illegal means, at a level of at least 1 million barrels per day. Accordingly, Haftar's personal income is estimated to be about 450-500 million USD per month, if at least 5 million barrels per month are delivered. This sum was deemed sufficient to maintain his power base in the region.

In August 2026, Haftar was credited with helping to arrange the release of Kevin Rideout, an American missionary who was kidnapped in Niger in October 2025 and taken hostage by an Islamic State affiliate.

== Allegations of war crimes and human rights violations ==
Haftar and forces under his command have been repeatedly accused of committing war crimes and other human rights abuses during the Libyan conflicts. Reports by Human Rights Watch, Amnesty International, and The Guardian have documented incidents of indiscriminate attacks on civilians, torture, extrajudicial executions, and enforced disappearances in areas controlled by the Libyan National Army (LNA).

In July 2017 a video posted online featured the execution of 20 suspected ISIS fighters by Haftar's forces, and this led the United Nations to call for the LNA to investigate summary executions of prisoners. In general, in many areas under his control several sources have denounced the abuses perpetrated by his militias and the several repressive actions undertaken to limit civil liberties.

In 2017, Ramzi al-Shaeri, vice-president of the Derna city council and lawyers Ryan Goodman and Alex Whiting accused Haftar of war crimes in the recapture of Derna. They alleged that Haftar had been complicit in calling for extrajudicial killings, arguing that Haftar had called on LNA fighters to take no prisoners, and saying in a speech, "Never mind consideration of bringing a prisoner here. There is no prison here. The field is the field, end of the story".

In May 2019, Amnesty International accused Haftar of participating in actions that amounted to war crimes during his battle for control of Tripoli.

Three civil lawsuits have been filed against Haftar in U.S. federal court, including suits accusing him of war crimes, torture, and other human rights violations. A suit against Haftar in the U.S. district court in Alexandria, Virginia was brought by families of victims in 2019; the plaintiffs contend that Haftar perpetrated war crimes, including the indiscriminate killing of civilians, during his military campaign backed by the United Arab Emirates, Egypt and Russia. The suit is based on the Torture Victim Protection Act of 1991. Judge Leonie Brinkema rejected Haftar's motion to dismiss the suit in 2020. In 2022, the judge adopted default judgement against Haftar after he repeatedly failed to show up in court. On 12 April 2024, Brinkema terminated the lawsuits against Haftar, stating that she had no jurisdiction to preside over alleged war crimes in Libya.

Several civil lawsuits were also filed against Haftar in the United States District Court for the Eastern District of Virginia under the Torture Victim Protection Act (TVPA), accusing him of responsibility for the killing of civilians and other war crimes in Libya. In 2022, a U.S. federal judge entered a default judgment against Haftar after he failed to appear in court, although the cases were later dismissed in April 2024 for lack of jurisdiction.

=== Accusations of migrant trafficking ===
International media investigations, including a 2023 report by Der Spiegel, also linked Haftar’s forces—particularly the Tariq Ben Zeyad Brigade—to abuses against migrants and refugees, including arbitrary detention, forced labour, and torture, in operations reportedly coordinated with European border control efforts.

In December 2023, Khalifa Haftar was accused of leading operations that intercepted and forcibly returned refugees trying to reach Europe. His militia, particularly the Tareq Bin Zeyad Brigade, reportedly engaged in brutal treatment of these refugees, including physical abuse and torture. They were also implicated in human trafficking, with allegations suggesting they profited from smuggling operations. These activities raised significant human rights concerns and highlighted potential violations of international law, while also drawing attention to the possible indirect involvement of European entities like Frontex and Maltese officials in facilitating or turning a blind eye to these practices.

== Family involvement in government and potential succession ==
=== Health ===
On 12 April 2018, it was reported that Haftar was in a coma after suffering a stroke and was hospitalized under intensive care in Paris. A spokesman for the LNA initially denied the reports. Local media later reported he was dead. However, sources close to him insisted he was alive. On 25 April, it was confirmed that Haftar was alive and had returned to Benghazi following treatment in Paris.

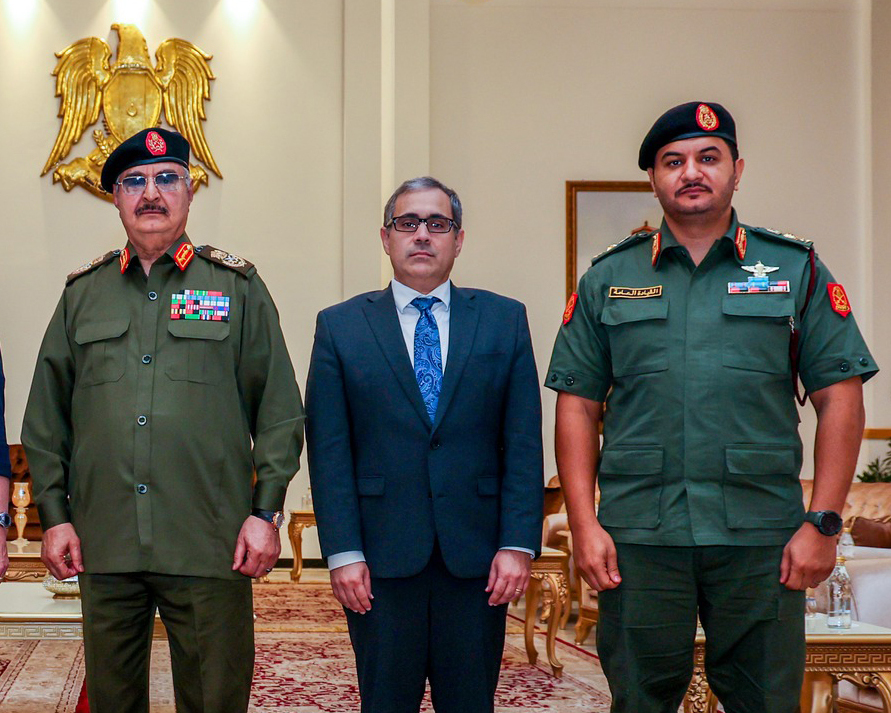
Haftar (left) and his son Saddam (right) with United States ambassador to Libya Jeremy Berndt in September 2024

Haftar has at least six sons and a daughter. Captain Saddam Haftar and Captain Khalid Haftar are officers in the Libyan National Army heading two Madkhali brigades, including the 106th Brigade accused of abducting Seham Sergiwa in 2019. Another son, Al-Sadiq Haftar, is also in Libya. Belqasim Haftar serves as his father's top political advisor. Two other sons, Uqba Haftar, who works in real estate, and Al-Muntasir Haftar as well as his daughter Asma Haftar lives in Virginia in the United States.

In October 2021, the Israel Hayom reported that Belqasim Haftar signed a contract worth "tens of millions of dollars in fees" with an Israeli consulting firm to run his father's presidential campaign.

In November 2021, Saddam Haftar secretly visited Israel on behalf of his father, allegedly seeking military aid and diplomatic assistance in return of normalizing relations. Khalifa Haftar allegedly had contacts with Mossad prior to Saddam's visit. Later that same month, Saddam Haftar allegedly guaranteed the safety of Saif al-Islam Gaddafi and Bashir Saleh Bashir to register themselves as president candidates in Sabha. Yet ten days later, the Tariq Ben Zeyad Brigade, led by Saddam and Khalid, stormed the courthouse in Sabha to prevent judges from hearing Saif al-Islam Gaddafi's appeal to participate in the presidential election.

Starting in March 2022, Uqba Haftar began the process of liquidating Haftar family's real estate holdings in the United States after a US judge ruled that Khalifa could be sued civilly for war crimes. Uqba allegedly received an offer from the United Arab Emirates to relocate there.

In December 2022, Saddam Haftar attempted to seize control of banking institutions in Cyrenaica. Later that same month, Saddam Haftar's Salafist Tariq Ben Zeyad Brigade, one of the largest wing of Khalifa's Libyan National Army, was accused by Amnesty International of committing war crimes.

In January 2023, Khalifa Haftar pledged to withdraw from the Libyan presidential election on the condition that his sons, Saddam and Belqasim, are allowed to run. Saddam Haftar is seen as the heir apparent of Khalifa Haftar.
