= Battle of Zliten =

Battle of the 2011 Libyan Civil War

Coordinates: 32.4667°N 14.5667°E

First Battle of Zliten
- Part of the Battle of the Misrata frontline
Date	21 July – 4 August 2011 (First phase); 5–18 August 2011 (Second phase); 19 August 2011 (Third phase)
Location	Zliten, Libya
Result	Pro-Gaddafi victory (First phase); Stalemate (Second phase); Anti-Gaddafi victory (Third phase)

Belligerents
(Libya) Anti-Gaddafi forces: National Liberation Army; Foreign military advisors; (United Nations) UNSC forces: NATO air forces	(Libya) Gaddafi Loyalists: Libyan Army; Paramilitary forces

Commanders and leaders
(Libya) Suleiman Mahmoud	(Libya) Khamis Gaddafi (Libya) Abdullah Senussi (Libya) Abdul Nabih Zayid (POW)

Casualties and losses
114 killed, 504 wounded	76–86 killed* Unknown number wounded
- 100+ civilians killed**
- *Based largely on unconfirmed rebel claims **Based largely on unconfirmed and partially confirmed loyalist claims

The Battle of Zliten followed an unsuccessful uprising in Zliten, Libya, during the Libyan Civil War. It began on 21 July 2011 when elements of the National Liberation Army, part of the anti-Gaddafi forces seeking to overthrow the government of Muammar Gaddafi, moved into the city of Zliten after struggling over the course of the past several months to extend the frontline westward from Misrata, the second-largest city in rebel hands.

== Background ==
The siege of Misrata ended in mid-May 2011 when rebel forces succeeded in breaking out of the city. However, the outskirts of Misrata continued to face bombardment from loyalist artillery. Loyalist forces attempted to push back into Misrata in June, but fierce fighting in the suburb of Dafniya and a rebel-assisted uprising in Zliten itself forced them to retreat. By 20 July, rebel fighters said they were just 1.5 kilometres (0.93 mi) from Zliten.

== The battle ==
Between 21 and 22 July, 16 rebels were killed and 126 wounded in fighting on Zliten's outskirts as opposition forces attempted to make a breakthrough toward the city center. However, loyalist forces stood firm. Government troops, backed up by tanks, managed to cut-off rebels in Suq Al Thulatha from the main opposition force and surround them. In more fighting on the outskirts of Zliten on 23 and 24 July, another 23 rebel fighters were wounded.

On 25 July, the Libyan government and local witnesses stated that a NATO air-strike targeted a small clinic in Zliten, causing the death of 11 civilians. Food storage buildings were also hit. The government showed the destroyed clinic and storage buildings to the international media. NATO claimed that these targets were a command and control node and a vehicle storage facility containing military vehicles. The same day, government forces destroyed a giant fuel tank in Misrata with Grad rockets causing most stations to close. Between 25 and 26 July, three rebels were killed and 11 others wounded in fighting on the frontline.

On 31 July, the rebel forces broke through the loyalist lines and captured abandoned Grad rocket launchers, as well as some 155mm artillery guns, cars and light weapons left behind by retreating loyalist forces. The rebels claimed to have entered Zliten but left the town shortly afterwards at the request of residents who feared artillery attacks by loyalist forces if the rebels took the area. 14 rebels were killed, with a further 20 injured. At least 40 loyalists surrendered to rebel forces the same day. The rebels, who were positioned at Suq al Talak, were considering bypassing Zliten and heading to Khoms, as they claimed to want to avoid fighting in the urban areas of Zliten itself. Overall, the rebels had advanced by 3 km, with an overall total of 27 killed in action, in the two days of fighting.

On 1 August, rebels claimed to have managed a 9 km incursion into Zliten, reportedly taking the town center and hospital. According to a rebel commander, the rebels were trying to convince the local Fowater tribe to allow them to stay and occupy the town. However, no other independent media reported on the claimed rebel victory. Al Jazeera stated that the situation in Zliten remained "fluid" and that there was heavy fighting in and around the town. Footage of Zliten with its inhabitants, denying that the city fell to the rebels, was aired on Libyan state TV.

On 2 August, Gaddafi forces attacked the rebels, reinforced by a brigade from Benghazi, in the farms north of Zliten, taking them by surprise and killing at least eight rebels and wounding 65. The local Fowater tribe has not agreed to let rebels take the town. Rebel commander Colonel Ahmed Omar Bani based in Benghazi said that fighting was taking place in Zliten's center, and they had not yet taken it. One of the opposition commanders leading the assault stated that earlier in the day rebels had made some gains on the eastern outskirts of Zliten, but following the loyalist counter-attack they were pushed back to their starting positions.

On 3 August, the Libyan government said that they pushed back the rebels to Dafniya after having beaten the rebels at the entrance to Zliten. The rebels denied these claims and stated that they had repelled the attempted offensive and had not retreated. Still, fighting appeared to be mostly centered in the eastern suburbs of the town, contradicting earlier rebel reports that they reached the city center.

On 4 August, the Libyan government showed to reporters the bodies of a woman and two children killed by a NATO air-strike in western Zliten. It was impossible for journalists to confirm the official account of the incident but they noted there was no military installation in the area of the air-strike as NATO claimed. The Gaddafi government stated they were in full control of Zliten, following the counter-attack they said pushed back the rebels to their original positions, and journalists who were taken on a tour of the city, including the city center, confirmed no sign of rebel forces. Also, CNN reported that artillery duels could be heard at least a few kilometres east of the city, contradicting earlier rebel reports that they had entered the eastern part of Zliten, while also contradicting the government's claim that they had been pushed back to Dafniya.

On 5 August, it was reported that rebel forces were smuggling weapons into Khoms, west of Zliten, and were preparing to launch an attack on Tripoli from there, due to the difficulty in taking the town of Zliten.

On 7 August, three rebels were killed and 15 wounded while trying to hold on to positions in Suq Al Thulatha after their advance into Zliten was halted due to the loyalist counter-attack and a lack of ammunition.

Two NATO air formations conducted a concerted strike on a former regime barracks and ammunition depot, as well as a headquarters, near Zliten on 8 August. Subsequent missions attacked two command and control facilities and a military staging post in Zliten and Khoms. At sea, HMS Bangor continued her long-standing mine countermeasures patrol off Misrata, where Colonel Gaddafi had repeatedly made unsuccessful attempts to deny the port to humanitarian shipping, while HMS Liverpool once again fired a barrage of illumination rounds to support NATO operations in the Zliten area.

On 9 August, the Libyan government claimed that 85 civilians were killed in NATO airstrikes on a village near Zliten. A NATO spokesman said that they were targeting four buildings in which nine vehicles were destroyed and that government claim "was not corroborated by available factual information at the site". The Libyan government declared three days of national mourning. Reporters were later taken to a hospital where they saw at least 30 dead bodies including the bodies of at least two young children. The Libyan government claimed that the bodies of others killed in the airstrikes were taken to other hospitals. Neither of these claims were independently verified, although some media outlets came to the conclusion that it seemed more credible than usual that something tragic happened due to the presence of at least 14 bodies at one hospital, including an infant.

On 18 August, rebels stated that an attempt to break the stalemate in Zliten by staging an uprising had failed, after well-equipped loyalist forces preempted a group of poorly equipped local rebels. Four people were killed, and five badly wounded in the exchange.

On 19 August, rebels launched an offensive against Zliten, which captured most of the city, including the town center. According to rebels, their casualties in the battle were 32 dead and 150 wounded. Al Jazeera confirmed that Zliten was in rebel hands by the evening, with a correspondent on the scene reporting that loyalist forces had fled and left behind a considerable amount of ammunition and heavy weapons. He also said residents of the city apparently rebelled against loyalist soldiers garrisoning the city as the rebel troops pushed into the city centre, helping to drive the pro-Gaddafi forces out. Rebel forces claimed to have advanced to the outskirts of Khoms. The Guardian also reported that Gaddafi forces launched a counter-attack on Zliten.

By 23 August, it was reported by Al Jazeera that rebel forces advanced into Khoms, facing no resistance, while being greeted by cheering residents and were advancing on Tripoli.
