= Battle of Misrata =

Battle of Misrata may refer to:

- Battle of Misrata (1912), during the Italo-Turkish War
- Battle of Misrata (2011), during the 2011 Libyan Civil War (February to May)

== See also ==
- Battle of the Misrata frontline, during the 2011 Libyan Civil War (May to August)
