= Ali Attalah Obeidi =

Libyan air marshal brigadier

Personal details
- Born: Libya
- Died: 6 July 2011 Near Dafniya, Libya

Military service
- Allegiance: Libyan Arab Jamahiriya (until 2011 Libyan civil war); Libyan National Transitional Council (2011)
- Branch/service: National Liberation Army
- Years of service: ?-2011
- Rank: Air Marshall Brigadier General
- Battles/wars: 2011 Libyan civil war * Battle of Misrata; *Battle of the Misrata frontline

Ali Attalah Obeidi (Arabic: علي عطا الله عبيدي, romanized: ʻAlī ʻAṭā Allāh ʻUbaydī) was an Air Marshall Brigadier in the army of former Libyan leader Muammar Gaddafi until the 2011 Libyan civil war when he defected to the opposition in April. The anti-Gaddafi forces showed a video of him, to prove this defection. The video showed him saying that he had quit because Gaddafi had given orders to kill civilians and he did not want the blood of his own people on his hands. Euronews reported claims from within Libya that the former general walked for fifteen days from Tripoli to the besieged city of Misrata. Obeidi claimed he had escaped from Mitaga air base to join the National Transitional Council.

== Death ==
When rebels were advancing from Dafniya, a town in the west of Libya, Ali Obeidi was killed along with eighteen others on 6 July. He was considered one of the top commanders in Misrata on the western front.
