= Ivaškevičius =

- Lithuanian surname
- m.: Ivaškevičius
- f.: (unmarried): Granauskaitė
- f.: (married): Ivaškevičiūtė
- Related names: Iwaszkiewicz

Ivaškevičius is a Lithuanian surname. Notable people with the surname include:

- Kęstutis Ivaškevičius (born 1985), Lithuanian footballer
- Marius Ivaškevičius, Lithuanian screenwriter, journalist and author
