= 2011 Ras Ajdir clashes =

- Part of Libyan Civil War
Date	13–26 August 2011
Location	Ras Ajdir, Libya
Result	Anti-Gaddafi Victory: Loyalists repel multiple rebel assaults on the crossing until rebel forces finally capture it on 26 August

Belligerents
(Libya) Anti-Gaddafi forces: National Liberation Army; Local Militia	(Libya) Gaddafi Loyalists: Libyan Army; Paramilitary forces

The 2011 Ras Ajdir clashes were a series of skirmishes between rebel anti-Gaddafi forces and loyalist pro-Gaddafi forces for an important Libya–Tunisia border post in Libya's extreme northwest.

The post had been a key loyalist supply line to the capital, Tripoli, but ceased to be so after the rebels recaptured the town of Zawiya and the highway running through it.

== Battle ==
On the night of 13 August 2011, rebel forces assaulted the crossing. The loyalists responded with tanks and other heavy weaponry, completely repelling the rebel assault.

On 21 August 2011, rebel forces again reached the crossing, meeting stiff resistance from what were reported to be "non-uniformed Gaddafi loyalists". Rebels made gains, but were once again repulsed by artillery fire. However, rebels did not entirely abandon their efforts, and the crossing remained contested.

On 23 August 2011, the Russian Channel One news agency reported that the crossing appeared to be under the control of pro-Gaddafi forces, who prohibited journalists from entering Libya.

On 26 August 2011, witnesses reported that clashes were once again erupting between "large numbers" of rebels and loyalists for control of Ras Ajdir. The Tunisian army closed down the border in response, declaring it a "closed military zone". This time, at least 100 anti-Gaddafi forces succeeded in capturing the crossing and hoisted their flag at the border post. Tunisian authorities reopened the crossing on 28 August.
