= Battle of the Misrata frontline =

Battle of the 2011 Libyan Civil War

- Part of Libyan Civil War
Date	16 May – 23 August 2011
Location	Misrata District, Libya
Result	Stalemate (mid-May–mid-August); Anti-Gaddafi victory (late August): Rebels capture Tawergha, Zliten, Khoms and the coastline towards Tripoli; Rebels advance south of Tawergha towards the Sirte road

Belligerents
(Libya) Anti-Gaddafi forces: National Liberation Army; Foreign military advisors; (United Nations) UNSC forces: NATO air forces	(Libya) Gaddafi Loyalists: Libyan Army; Paramilitary forces

Commanders and leaders
(Libya) Ibrahim Bet-Almal (Libya) Nuri Abdullah Abdullatif (Libya) Suleiman Mahmoud (Libya) Air Marshal Brigadier Ali Attalah Obeidi †	(Libya) Khamis Gaddafi (Libya) Abdullah Senussi (Libya) Abdul Nabih Zayid (POW)

Strength
7,000	4,500

Casualties and losses
435 killed 1,756 wounded	522–532 killed*
- 14 civilians killed in the Misrata area, 100+ civilians killed in the Zliten area**
- *Based largely on unconfirmed rebel claims **Based largely on unconfirmed and partially confirmed loyalist claims

The Battle of the Misrata frontline was a battle during the Libyan Civil War between pro-Gaddafi loyalists and anti-Gaddafi forces on the western and southwestern outskirts of Misrata, the third largest city in Libya. It ended when anti-Gaddafi soldiers secured Zliten to the west and Tawergha to the south, establishing a significant buffer zone around the city.

== Background ==
Following the Battle of Misrata in mid-May 2011, rebel forces retook large parts of the city, which had been under pro-Gaddafi control, and established a defence line on Misrata's western outskirts at the small town of Dafniya, 35 kilometers from the centre of the city, and on the southwestern outskirts near Tawergha, which was still loyalist-held. What followed was more than a month of heavy frontline fighting and shelling. The aim of the rebels was to keep Misrata out of the artillery range of loyalist forces and to eventually make a breakthrough to the west toward the town of Zliten and then ultimately to the capital of Tripoli.

== Battle ==
=== Frontline fighting and stalemate ===
On 16 May, NATO warships chased away two inflatable boats near Misrata's port, one boat was left abandoned with explosives and mannequins on board. They were said to look like people and were apparently meant to draw ships in so they could be targeted when the explosives detonated. The boat was destroyed by gunfire.

On 17 May, seven people were killed and 32 wounded, mostly rebels, during clashes between opposition and loyalist forces on the eastern and western edges of the city. The same day, Libyan state television claimed that Gaddafi's forces attacked a NATO warship off the coast of Misrata, this however was denied by NATO officials, stating that "It's a totally fabricated allegation".

On 19 May, one rebel was killed and 10 were wounded by loyalist artillery fire in Dafniya, Zreig and Abu Rwea, on Misrata's western outskirts.

On 23 May, two more people were killed and several wounded in fighting on the city's outskirts. During the fighting, a column of five loyalist tanks, accompanied by 50 infantry, advanced on rebel positions at Dafniya, on Misrata's western outskirts. During the advance, opposition forces were hit by heavy artillery shelling and rocket fire. The shelling also hit some of Misrata's neighbourhoods in the western and southern suburbs.

On 26 May, three rebels were killed and 20 wounded by mortar fire on the frontlines near Misrata.

On 27 May, Gaddafi's forces laid landmines in the Misrata area, according to the commander of the NATO mission. "This morning reports showed that a minefield was laid in the Misrata area," Lieutenant General Charles Bouchard told a news conference. Also, rebels and loyalists engaged in fierce fighting for a second straight day on the western outskirts of the city in which five more rebels were killed and more than a dozen wounded.

On 28 May, rebels and loyalists fought at Tawergha, 40 kilometres south of Misrata, where rebels claimed to have captured a hospital which contained numerous weapons and tanks. Fighting also raged 25 kilometres east of Misrata. In all, 8-10 rebels were reported to have died in the fighting and 15-40 were wounded. Two loyalist soldiers were captured and an unknown number killed.

On 29 May, two rebels were killed and 28 wounded after loyalists attempted an attack against Dafniya. The rebels claimed to have killed several soldiers, captured a tank and repelled the attack.

On 31 May, opposition forces attempted to advance from Dafniya toward loyalist lines but were pushed back in fighting that left one rebel dead and 29 wounded.

On 1 June, a rebel spokesman from Zliten claimed that the Gaddafi regime was arming criminals in order to use them to crush an anti-Gaddafi rebellion in that city. The regime flatly denied these reports, labelling them unverified and "completely false".

On 2 June, shelling at the frontline left one person dead and three wounded.

On 3 June, more fighting killed one rebel and wounded two at the frontline.

On 4 June, in fighting on both the western and eastern outskirts of Misrata, four rebels were killed and one wounded.

On 6 June, loyalist forces pushed two kilometers into Dafniya, on the western side of Misrata, firing Grad rockets, before being pushed back by three kilometers. Two people were killed and 17 wounded during the fighting and the main station supplying electricity to Misrata had been hit leaving some areas of the city without power. At the same time, there was also fighting on the eastern side of the town.

On 8 June, loyalist forces launched a massive offensive on Misrata, shelling the city from three sides and trying to enter the city. After the loyalist attack, the rebels attempted a counter-attack and they also advanced to the west, south and east. But their advance was stopped and they suffered heavy casualties. In total, 14 rebels were killed and 35 wounded. One rebel claimed that 70 loyalist soldiers were killed during the fighting, but no other source confirmed the claim.

On 10 June, loyalist forces shelled Misrata and made a ground attack against opposition lines killing 31 rebels and wounding 160. Several loyalist soldiers were also killed and at least two tanks destroyed. A rebel spokesman stated that during the previous week of fighting 120 people had been killed at Misrata's frontline and 350 wounded, most of them rebels. Libya State TV reported that government forces shot down a NATO helicopter near Zliten. NATO denied this. At the same time, heavy fighting had reportedly broken out in Zliten, due to an uprising from rebels within the city.

By 12 June, the rebel death toll from three days of shelling had reached nearly 40. The same day, seven rebels fighters were killed and 49 wounded in the Dafniya district. The rebels also claimed to have captured 10 loyalist soldiers after an ambush. The Misrata refinery was damaged after six rockets hit its power generators.

On 17 June, loyalists and rebels exchanged artillery fire killing ten rebels and one civilian. 39 opposition fighters and two children were wounded. Rebels fired rockets aiming for government tanks and ammo stockpiles in Naimah.

The next day, 18 June, Gaddafi's forces withdrew from Naimah, with minimal fighting, prompting rebels to take the area. Al Jazeera correspondent Tony Birtley said the rebels were now aiming to take the village of Majer, southwest of Naimah, and southeast of Zliten.

On 19 June, 10 rebels were killed and 54 wounded in shelling and an ambush conducted by Gaddafi forces, who advanced one kilometer toward rebel lines, making the total casualties for just over a week at more than 40 dead and around 200 wounded. Reuters reporter Matt Robinson analyzed that the rebels small gains were made with heavy casualties due to their inexperience in battles in open areas. Rebels also admitted of doing tactical mistakes such as ruining surprise attacks. One rebel also complained that it was always the same units fighting on the frontline.

On 20 June, more fighting near Dafniya left another 11 rebels dead and 30-54 wounded. Also, a loyalist rocket attack on a residential area near Misrata's port killed a 14-year-old boy and wounded six of his relatives, including his mother and brother.

On 21 June, during another round of fighting, four rebels were killed and 60 wounded. Loyalist forces had managed to advance one kilometer which led to rebel mortar units falling back slightly. Four loyalist long-range rockets hit Misrata's city center, but there were no casualties.

On 22 June, more loyalist artillery bombardment at the frontline killed four rebels and wounded 12. Earlier in the day, NATO air-strikes and ship shelling hit a loyalist military compound in Zliten, which was allegedly used for artillery attacks against rebel positions near Misrata. NATO stated that they destroyed 13 technicals, one armored personnel carrier and one mobile rocket launcher. In addition, a rebel spokesman claimed that over 200 loyalist soldiers were killed in the attack. However, there was no independent verification of the number of dead and previous rebel claims of loyalist death tolls were known to be inflated. The loyalists, for their part, claimed that dozens of people were killed.

As of 24 June, information coming from the battlefield became almost non-existent, since rebels initiated a media clampdown on the press with the introduction of official minders, vetted translators and no more free trips to the frontline, citing setbacks on the front.

On 26 June, an AP reporter from Misrata stated that one person was killed and seven wounded by two shells.

On 2 July, it was reported that shelling at Dafniya left 11 rebels wounded.

On 3 July, two rebels were killed and 12 wounded during fighting on the frontline.

On 4 July, six rebels were killed and 22 wounded in a loyalist ambush south of Misrata. The next day, another 11 rebels were killed and 42 others wounded in the heaviest artillery bombardment of rebel positions by Gaddafi's forces in weeks.

On 6 July, 19 rebels were killed and 42 others wounded in fighting near Misrata, as well as 10 loyalist soldiers. Three civilians were also killed in loyalist rocket attacks. Among the rebels killed was Air Marshal Brigadier Ali Attalah Obeidi, who defected in April to the opposition forces. Earlier in the day, rebels said that they advanced 20 km toward the west but a Reuters reporter who later reached the new front line said the rebel positions had moved forward by seven kilometers.

=== Rebel advance on Suq Al Thulatha ===
On 8 July, after heavy fighting which continued since 6 July, the rebels claimed that they managed to capture the village Suq Al Thulatha on the outskirts of Zliten, about 6.5 kilometres (4.0 mi) away from the city center. Seven rebels died and more than 30 were wounded in the fighting. Another 500 rebel fighters from other parts of rebel-held Libya also reinforced Misrata fighters the same day.

On 10 July, rebels encountered several minefields in Suq Al Thulatha, in which one rebel died and 32 were injured. Rebels had also shelled the coastal road near Zliten, in the early hours, killing seven people.

On 11 July, 11 rebels were killed and 25 wounded in more fighting in the area of Suq Al Thulatha after loyalist forces attempted to take a hill which had a strategic overlook of Misrata in the distance. They advance 300 meters before being pushed back.

On 12 July, 19 rebels were killed and 22 wounded in heavy frontline shelling by loyalist forces.

The next day, 13 July, more fighting left five rebels dead and 17 wounded.

On 16 July, six rebels were killed and four wounded in fighting on the frontline.

On 18 July, 23 rebel fighters were wounded during fighting in the region of Dafniya.

On 20 July, seven rebels were killed and 13 wounded when they started a new offensive towards Zliten that they claimed had put them within 1.5 kilometers of the city. Three wounded loyalist soldiers were captured by the rebels during the fighting, of which one died later of his wounds. Rebel forces attempting to advance towards Zliten managed to capture General Abdul Nahib Zayid, who had been commanding pro-Gaddafi forces in Zliten and who had been heavily involved in the Battle of Misrata.

Between 25 and 26 July, three rebels were killed and 11 others wounded in fighting on the frontline.

On 27 July, four rebels were killed and 14 wounded in fighting west and south of Misrata.

=== Battle of Zliten ===
Rebels launched an offensive into Zliten on 21 July, but on 22 July, loyalists appeared to gain the upper hand, forcing them back into the outskirts of the city.

On 25 July, government forces destroyed a giant fuel tank in Misrata with Grad rockets causing most stations to close.

On 30 July, loyalists launched a big attack on Dafniyah from its south with tanks and infantry, breaking through rebel lines and inflicting major casualties before being forced back. The rebel counteroffensive made it to Souk al Talak, west of Souk al Thulatha, before the anti-Gaddafi forces were pushed back to Souk al Thulatha. They reportedly mulled bypassing Zliten in favor of an offensive against Khoms, but they continued to advance toward Zliten.

On 1 August, rebels said they had seized the city centre of Zliten, but fighting continued and the rebels reportedly had difficulty in securing the support of local tribes. Though the government claimed it had full control of Zliten on 3 August, journalists reported fighting continued in the city.

On 2 August, Gaddafi forces attacked the rebels, reinforced by a brigade from Benghazi, in the farms north of Zliten, taking them by surprise and killing at least eight rebels and wounding 65. One of the opposition commanders leading the assault stated that earlier in the day rebels had made some gains on the eastern outskirts of Zliten, but following the loyalist counter-attack they were pushed back to their starting positions.

On 3 August, the Libyan government said that they pushed back the rebels to Dafniyah after having beaten the rebels at the entrance to Zliten. The rebels denied these claims and stated that they had repelled the attempted offensive and had not retreated. Still, fighting appeared to be mostly centered in the eastern suburbs of the town, contradicting earlier rebel reports that they reached the city center.

The rebel offensive in Zliten stalled by 7 August, and opposition forces were trying to hold on to positions in Suq Al Thulatha after their advance into Zliten was halted due to the loyalist counter-attack and a lack of ammunition.

On 9 August, the Libyan government claimed that 85 civilians were killed in NATO airstrikes on Majer, a village near Zliten. A NATO spokesman said the sites struck were legitimate military targets and they had no evidence of civilian casualties. Reporters viewed at least 30 bodies, several of them the bodies of women and children.

Rebels made a major push into Zliten on 19 August, and in the evening, Al Jazeera's Andrew Simmons reported from Zliten that the city was under rebel control and people were celebrating in the streets. Loyalist forces reportedly retreated to Khoms.

=== Battle of Tawergha ===
On 11 August, six rebels were killed and 70 wounded as the rebels attempted to push toward Tawargha where they later that day claimed victory over loyalist forces.

Fighting continued at Tawargha the next day with another three rebels being killed and another three opposition fighters were killed in clashes at Zliten.

=== End of the battle ===
On 13 August rebels claimed to have taken a bridge over the Sawfajjin valley which links Misrata and Sirte.

On 13 August, a governmental spokesman claimed that loyalist forces had defeated an attempt by rebels to take the city of Bani Walid, southwest of Misrata. No other sources have reported on the claimed battle at Bani Walid.

On 17 August, rebels stated that they had reached the outskirts of Al Hayshah, north of a major crossroads. Misrata radio reported that a column of rebel vehicles advanced southwards from Misrata, taking the town of Bir Durfan, and intended to capture the city of Bani Walid within days.

On 23 August, the city of Khoms and the coastline towards Tripoli were captured by rebel forces.
