= 2011 Msallata clashes =

- Part of the Libyan Civil War
Date	3–9 August 2011
Location	Msallata, Libya
Result	Unclear: Rebels take control of the town after a popular uprising.; Pro-Gaddafi forces surround the town.; No independent contact with the rebels in the town since 7 August.; Rebels take control of Msallata in September.

Belligerents
(Libya) Anti-Gaddafi forces: Local Militia	(Libya) Gaddafi Loyalists: Libyan Army; Paramilitary forces; Libyan Police

Casualties and losses
3 killed	Unknown

The 2011 Msallata clashes were a series of clashes in the Libyan Civil War between rebel anti-Gaddafi forces and loyalist pro-Gaddafi forces for control of the town of Msallata which took place in early August 2011.

== Clashes ==
On 4 August, a Msallata resident reported to Reuters that, on 3 August, "There was a clash between people waiting in a queue outside a bakery. It was just before sunset, when people break the Ramadan fast". After police intervened, it turned into a protest against the government. Several government buildings were set on fire, troops were called in and the town declared a closed area. Local rebels overran a local school that was being used as a base for government troops in the town.

On 6 August, Msallata rebels reported to AFP that pro-Gaddafi forces did not control the town, but had it surrounded and were making arrests on the periphery. Electricity and communications were cut off and they feared a bloodbath.

On 7 August, Raed Hussein, an envoy from Msallata's military council, reported that the town remained under rebel control after four days of siege. However, he expected that more loyalists would be sent from nearby Khoms to bolster the siege.

On 9 August, rebel-aligned al-Manara Media reported that a private militia run by a "gangster" appointed by Gaddafi controlled Msallata's exits while anti-Gaddafi Msallata residents controlled most of the inner city.
