= Radosław Gruk =

Polish diplomat

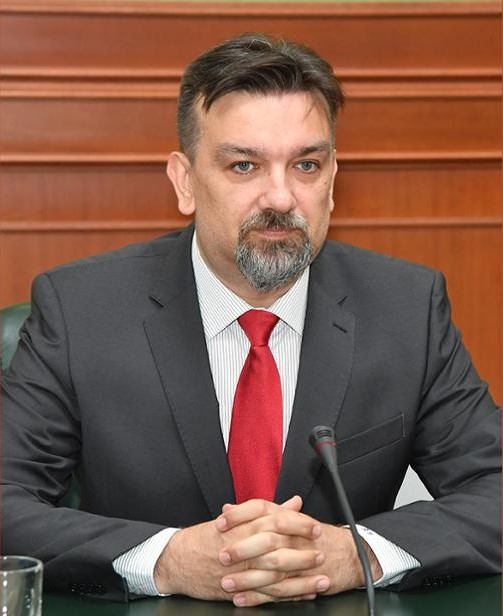

5th Poland Ambassador to Uzbekistan
- In office 8 May 2021 – July 2024
- Preceded by: Piotr Iwaszkiewicz

Personal details
- Born: 23 April 1971 (age 55) Katowice, Poland
- Spouse: Monika Gruk
- Education: University of Warsaw
- Profession: Diplomat

Radosław Tomasz Gruk (born 23 April 1971) is a Polish diplomat, an ambassador to Uzbekistan (2021–2024).

== Life ==
Radosław Gruk earned his master's degree in political science at the University of Warsaw.

After graduating, in 1999 he began his professional career at the Ministry of Interior and Administration specializing in the matters related to Polish citizenship. In 2000, he joined the Office for Foreigners where he was in charge of repatriation of Poles from the former Soviet Union. He was cooperating with the Radom Airport and Polish National Tourist Office.

In 2003, Gruk joined the Ministry of Foreign Affairs. Until 2007, he was Second and First Secretary at the Consulate-General in Saint Petersburg, Russia. Between 2007 and 2013 he was Consul and political-economic officer at the rank of Counsellor and First Counsellor at the Embassy in Podgorica, Montenegro. In 2015, he was sent to the Consulate-General in Almaty, Kazakhstan, being promoted to the head of unit and, since 2017, Consul General. In 2019, he ended his term and became deputy director of the MFA Bureau of Human Resources. In 2020, he was nominated Ambassador to Uzbekistan, beginning his term on 8 May 2021. He has been accredited also to Tajikistan. On 25 August 2021, he presented his credentials to the President of Uzbekistan Shavkat Mirziyoyev. He ended his mission in 2024.

He is married to Monika Gruk who is also a diplomat.

== Honours ==
- 2016 – Honorary Badge of the Siberian
- 2016 – Pro Patria Medal
- 2017 – Golden Badge of Honor for Merits to the Siberian Association
- 2018 – Honorary badge "For Merit for Tourism"
- 2018 – Badge "For Merit for Sport"
- 2018 – Bene Merito Dioecesis Bydgostiensis
- 2019 – Medal „Za Zasługi dla Polaków w Kazachstanie”
- 2020 – Gold Cross of Merit
- 2021 – Medal of the Centenary of Regained Independence
