= Iwaszkiewicz =

Iwaszkiewicz is a Polish surname. East Slavic variant: Ivashkevich. Notable people include:

- Anna Iwaszkiewicz (1897-1979), Polish writer
- Jarosław Iwaszkiewicz (1894–1980), Polish writer and communist politician
- Piotr Iwaszkiewicz (1959–2021), Polish historian and diplomat
- Robert Iwaszkiewicz (born 1962), Polish politician
- Wacław Iwaszkiewicz-Rudoszański (1871–1922), Polish general
