= Zliten uprising =

Uprising in the Libyan Civil War

- Part of Libyan Civil War
Date	9 June – 16 June 2011
Location	Zliten, Libya
Result	Pro-Gaddafi victory
Territorial changes	Pro-Gaddafi forces crush the uprising in the city

Belligerents
(Libya) Anti-Gaddafi forces (United Nations) UNSC forces	(Libya) Libyan Arab Jamahiriya

Commanders and leaders
(Libya) Unknown	(Libya) Khamis Gaddafi

Units involved
(Libya) National Liberation Army	Armed forces of the Libyan Arab Jamahiriya; (Libya) Libyan Army; Paramilitary Forces

Casualties and losses
22 killed	4 tanks destroyed, other casualties unknown

The Zliten uprising was a local uprising in the Libyan Civil War, started by rebel anti-Gaddafi forces against loyalist pro-Gaddafi forces in the city of Zliten. The city was of strategic importance due to its close proximity to the capital of Tripoli. After Zliten, only two cities – Khoms and Tajura – separated the rebel stronghold of Misrata from Tripoli.

== Background ==
Zliten rose against Gaddafi during the initial onset of the rebellion in February 2011, but the city was soon retaken by pro-Gaddafi loyalists. It was initially used as a staging point for loyalist attacks on rebel-held Misrata. According to a report by the United Nations refugee agency, men had been kidnapped from Misrata during the battle for the city, and taken to governmental camps in Zliten, before being forced to pledge allegiance to the government and fight on the pro-Gaddafi side.

By early May, the rebel Free Libyan Army had expelled pro-Gaddafi forces from Misrata, pushing by 9 May to the village of Dafniya, 20 kilometers east of Zliten. The frontline remained relatively static for the next month, with rumors of discontent and rebellion in Zliten persisting. According to the rebels, they are training and equipping fighters from Zliten, so that the city may liberate themselves. Rebels also claimed that NATO had been holding them back, preventing the frontline from advancing.

On 15 May, a rebel spokesman claimed that the anti-Gaddafi forces from Misrata had coordinated efforts with Zliten revolutionaries, and defeated Gaddafi forces, but this claim was later found to be untrue.

On 1 June, a rebel spokesman claimed that Gaddafi had begun arming criminals in Zliten, in an effort to keep the city under his control. This claim was denied by the Libyan government.

== Uprising ==
By 9 June, heavy fighting erupted in the city of Zliten, with the rebels suffering 22 fatalities by the next day. Pro-Gaddafi forces surrounded the city, armed with artillery and Grad rockets. According to rebels, the loyalist forces threatened to have the city's women raped by mercenaries, if it did not surrender. RAF airstrikes destroyed at least 4 loyalist MBTs outside the city.

On 10 June, Libya State TV reported that government forces shot down a NATO helicopter near Zliten. NATO denied this.

By 11 June, rebels controlled some parts of the town, but the city center was still firmly under the control of loyalist forces.

On 14 June, NATO attack helicopters were deployed and subsequently destroyed two rigid-hull inflatable boats being operated by pro-Gaddafi forces threatening maritime traffic in the area. Shortly afterwards, the attack helicopters successfully struck an anti-aircraft heavy machine gun and three military vehicles hidden under trees in the vicinity of Zliten.

The next day, Sheikh Khalifa Zuwawi, the chairman of the rebel council in Misrata, appealed to NATO to intervene in the city to save the uprising from certain annihilation by loyalist forces. Rebels within the city had been pinned down in a single district, and photographers who approached to around four miles outside the city photographed rockets being fired within the town.

By 16 June, major fighting in Zliten had ceased. Reports suggested that the rebels were holding just a few pockets of the town near the center while the majority of the city was still in loyalist hands with government troops conducting sweeps and arresting people suspected of being involved with the opposition forces.

On 17 June, rebels confirmed they had no intention of taking Zliten using forces from Misrata, but were rather aiming to support Zliten residents in taking up arms against Gaddafi's forces.

On 15 July, tens of thousands of Gaddafi supporters, coming from the city and from other cities in buses, were seen on the main square of Zliten to protest against the international recognition of the rebel council.
