= Libyan Army (1951–2011) =

- الجيش الليبي
- Active: 1951–2011
- Country: Kingdom of Libya; Libyan Arab Republic; Libyan Arab Jamahiriya
- Type: Army
- Size: 100,000
- Headquarters: Tripoli
- Engagements: Egyptian–Libyan War; Uganda–Tanzania War; Chadian–Libyan War; First Libyan Civil War

Insignia
- Identification mark

The Libyan Army (Arabic: الجيش الليبي) was the branch of the Armed Forces of the Libyan Arab Jamahiriya, the Libyan Arab Republic and the Kingdom of Libya responsible for ground warfare.

== History ==
=== Kingdom of Libya ===
The origin of the Royal Libyan Army can be traced back to the Libyan Arab Force (popularly known as the Sanusi Army). Established in August 1940 to fight against the Italians, it was a unit of Arab exiles mostly of Cyrenaican origin, although the unit also had a small number of Tripolitanian volunteers and Sudanese men living in Egypt recruited by the future king of Libya, Sayed Idris and led by British officers.

The battalions of the Libyan Army Force were largely used as auxiliaries, constructing defensive works, patrolling, and guarding military installations and prisoners, though they saw combat during the siege of Tobruk.

With the withdrawal of Axis forces from Libya in 1943, the Force changed its name to "The Cyrenaica Defence Force" and was disbanded shortly after, with most of its members joining the newly formed gerdarmerie in the British administered Libya.

When Libya gained its independence in 1951, veterans of the original Sanusi army formed the nucleus of the Royal Libyan Army. Until the discovery of oil in the late 1950s, Libya had an insignificant military, given its small population and lack of resources. King Idris deliberately divided his security forces into a regular army and a variety of gendarmerie forces. These gendarmes primary mission was to prevent any dissidence from the Armed Forces.

After the discovery of oil, the Royal Libyan Army was slowly expanded with British assistance and by 1969, it was estimated to have a strength of 6,500 men, about half the size of the armed police (largely recruited from tribes considered loyal by the king).

King Idris, fearing a military led coup largely neglected the Royal Libyan Army, refusing to provide it with tanks, artillery and armored personnel carriers that could potentially be used by mutineers against him, relying instead on the Cyrenaica Defense Force and the Tripolitania Defense Force to protect his reign. He also relied on several lightly armed territorial forces and the mobile National Security Force, which was equipped with armored cars and helicopters. However, they didn't offer any resistance against the 1969 Libyan revolution led by Colonel Muammar Gaddafi.

=== Libyan Arab Republic ===
Within a year after the coup, the Libyan Army size increased to 22,000 men, following a recruitment campaign as well the integration of 14,000 men from the disbanded National Security Force and Cyrenaica Defense Force.

After Gaddafi and his fellow Free Officers severed ties with the United States and the United Kingdom, France became the main supplier of weapons to Libya until 1974, when the Soviet Union agreed to sell vast amounts of weaponry to Libya, far exceeding the needs of the country armed forces. Libyan training and logistics suffered with the sheer amount of equipment purchased and the wide diversity of equipment types.

=== Libyan Arab Jamahiriya period ===
From the late seventies to the mid to late eighties the army was involved in four major incursions across the border with Chad, which became known as the Chadian–Libyan War. The Libyan Army suffered great losses in these conflicts especially that of the Toyota War of 1987 largely due to poor tactics and western aid to Chad. During the first four months of the Toyota War, large amounts of military equipment were captured by the Chadians. After the war, Gaddafi's forces declined in quality.

Overspending on military equipment between the 1970s and 1980s coupled with international sanctions negatively affected the Libyan Army capabilities, which had a massive weapons inventory that it could not effectively operate, maintain, and upgrade. According to a 2009 Center for Strategic International Studies (CSIS) assessment, Libya's only had 25 to 33% of the personnel necessary to maintain combat units in full strength and operate its military equipment pool, which explains why a large amount of equipment was kept in storage. Other problems were inadequate training, Gaddafi's promotion of politically reliable officers over military competency, and constant rotation of the officer corps to prevent coup attempts.

Ever since he came to power, Gaddafi sought to reduce the strength of the army by creating several paramilitary units, including the Revolutionary Guard Corps and the Islamic Legion to further protect himself from possible coup attempts. These units were best armed and trained units of the Libyan military. These units were equipped with weapons taken from the regular army inventory including: T-54/T-55 and T-62 tanks, EE-9 Cascavel armoured cars, ZSU-23-4 and 9K33 Osa anti-aircraft systems.

In February 2011, the First Civil War broke out and several units of the army mutinied and defected to the opposition, with battles taking place across much of the country. During the war, Gaddafi's loyalists were composed of paramilitary forces, members of his own clan, and foreign mercenaries (including Syrians, North Koreans, and Eastern Europeans).

In September 2011, the pre-civil war Libyan Army had been effectively destroyed by a combination of NATO air strikes and combat with rebel forces, with the Libyan Army forces still loyal to Gaddafi abandoning their posts in Tripoli as the rebels took the city, and the remnants of Gaddafi's loyalist army holed up in Sirte, Sabha and Bani Walid.

== Combat experience ==
A sharp series of border clashes occurred with Egypt in 1977, and Libyan forces were flown into Uganda in 1978 in an unsuccessful effort to defend Idi Amin's Uganda against invading Tanzanian forces. In addition, the Libyans conducted a series of campaigns in Northern Chad since 1980, launching a campaign against Chad that year and again in 1983. In April 1987, Libya suffered a disastrous defeat in Chad, losing nearly a quarter of its invasion force.

=== Egypt ===
On 19 July 1977, after a protest march by Libyans was stopped by Egyptian border guards, Libyan artillery units fired into Egypt. After further border violations were alleged by both sides, fighting escalated on the same day with an artillery duel, and, two days later, a drive along the coast by Egyptian armor and infantry during which the Libyan army was engaged. Egypt claimed successful surprise air strikes against the Libyan air base at Al Adem, just south of Tobruk, and surface-to-air missile batteries and radar stations were knocked out as well.

When the Egyptians withdrew on 24 July, most foreign analysts agreed that the Egyptian units had prevailed, although Libyan forces responded more effectively than had been expected. Libyan army hailed the encounter as a victory, using the fight as a justification for further purchases of modern armaments.

=== Uganda ===
In the case of Uganda, Libya had intervened on Idi Amin's behalf during his first confrontation with neighboring Tanzania in 1972 by airlifting a contingent of 4000 troops. During the invasion of Uganda by Tanzanian troops and Ugandan exiles in 1978, a new Libyan force estimated at 2,000 to 2,500 was sent, assisting in the defence of Entebbe and Kampala by covering road junctions with armored equipment.

Unprepared and undermotivated Libyan troops were quickly routed in attacks by foot soldiers. As many as 600 Libyans were estimated to have been killed during the Ugandan operation, and the remainder were hurriedly withdrawn. The troops had been led to believe that they were being airlifted into Uganda for training exercises with Ugandan units.

=== Chad ===
After nearly two decades, Col. Muammar Gaddafi's attempts to annex Northern Chad ended in 1987. In just the first three months of 1987, Libya lost almost all the territory it had held in Chad, between $500 million and $1 billion in weapons and one-third of its 15,000 troops. Over 4,494 Libyan soldiers were killed by Chad's forces between January and March 1987.

The Libyan Army was defeated by a force substantially inferior in numbers and equipment. Chad's victory was the result of a combination of Western funding, weapons and intelligence and Chadian courage, tactics and leadership. France provided air cover and troops to protect the Chadian rear areas, while the USA provided $240 million in equipment and weapons. The U.S. also contributed $75 million in emergency military aid, including transport aircraft and air defence systems.

The Chad forces displayed some remarkable tactical innovations: they used Toyota all-terrain vehicles, lightly armored French-made Panhard cars, and Milan antitank and Stinger antiaircraft missiles to destroy Libyan tanks and planes.

=== First Libyan Civil War ===
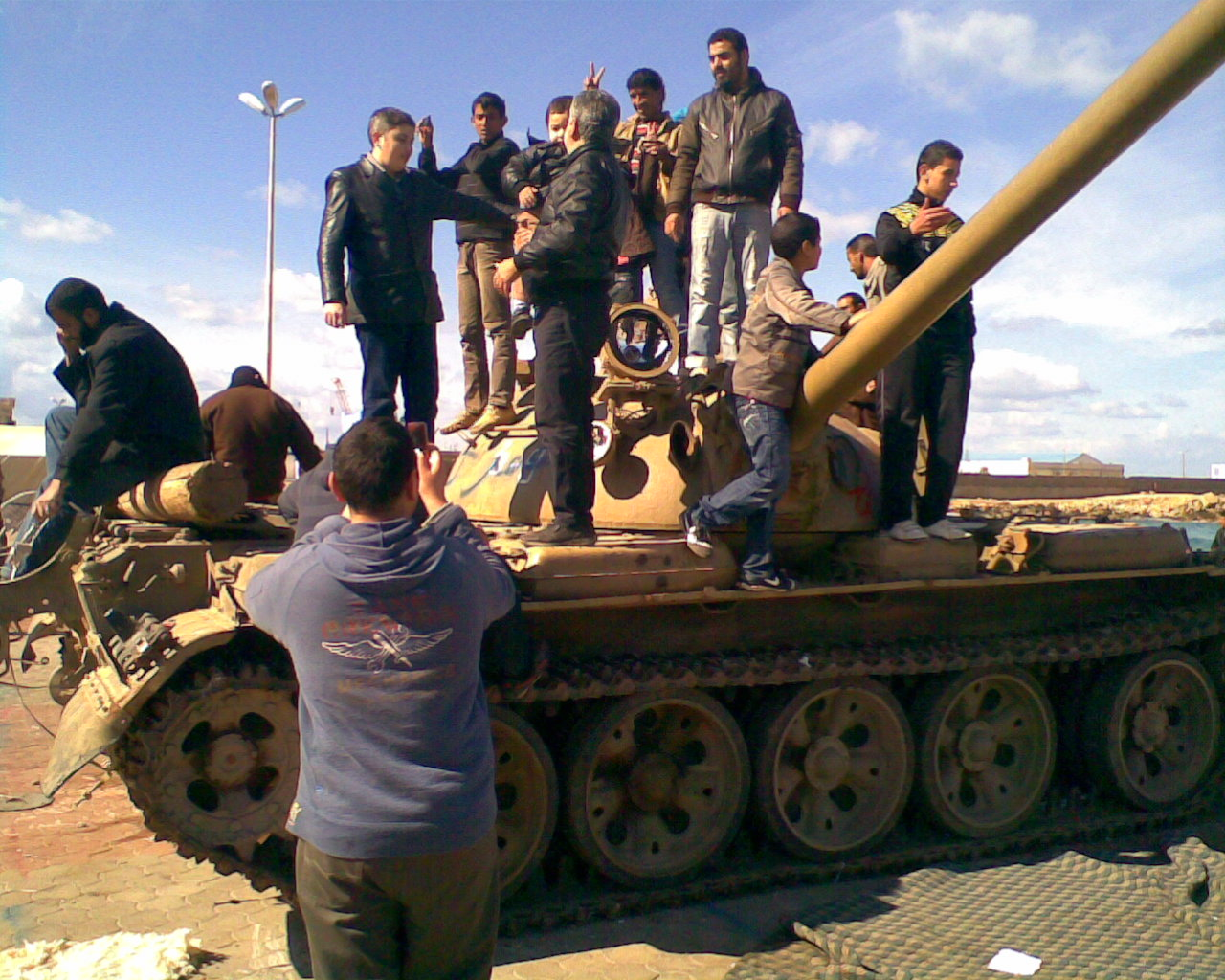
People on a tank in a Benghazi rally, 23 February 2011

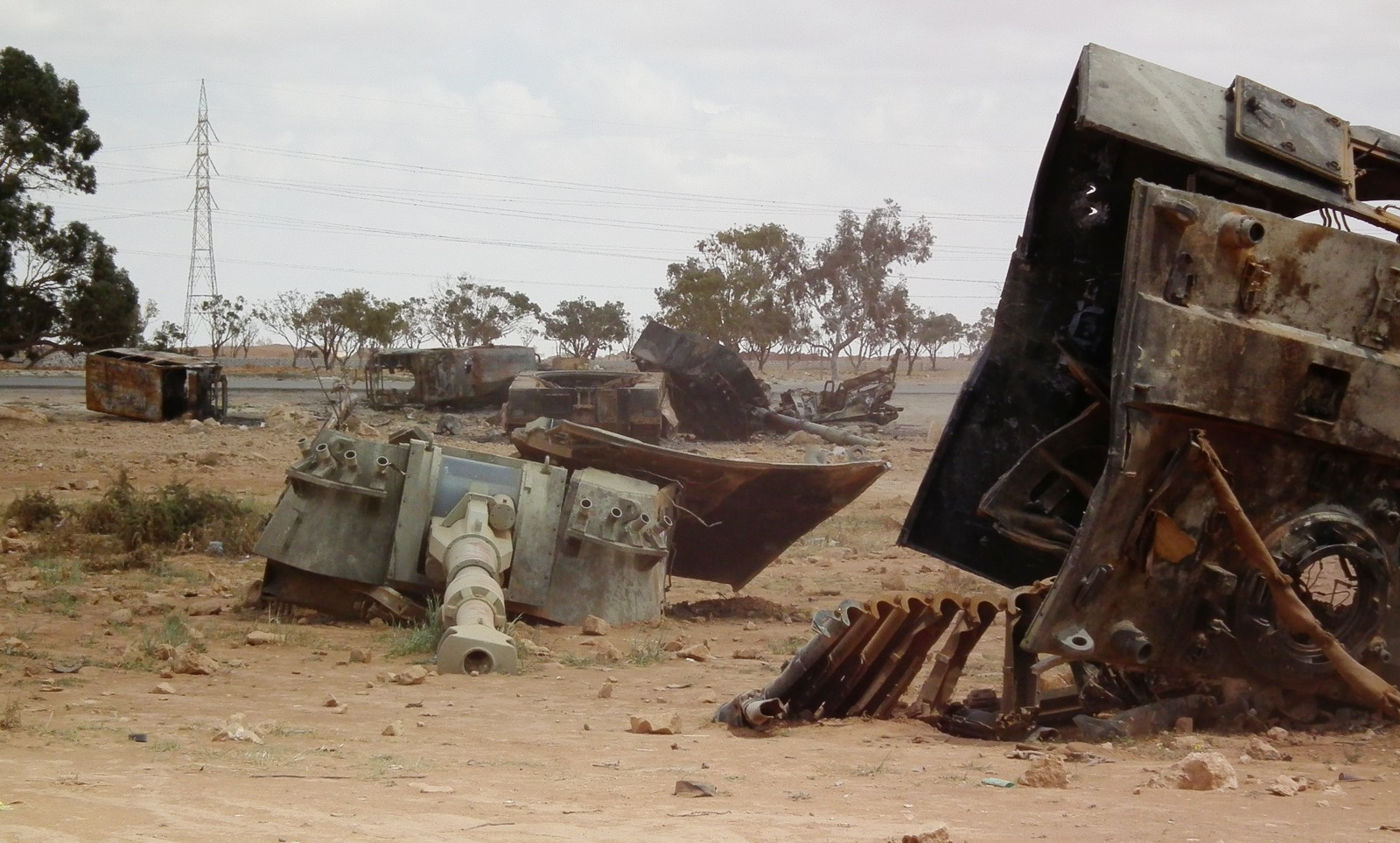
Palmaria heavy howitzers of the Libyan Army, destroyed by French airplanes close to the west-southern border of Benghazi, Libya, 19 March 2011

In February 2011 protests against the rule of Gaddafi started in Libya. They were inspired by similar protests in other Arab countries. Gaddafi used police and mercenary forces to violently suppress the protest. This resulted in an armed uprising in Libya between pro-government and anti-government rebel forces. Parts of the army defected to the rebels and weapon depots were plundered by protesters.

After initial advances by the rebels, the Libyan Army began a counteroffensive and started pushing back the rebel fighters. On 17 March 2011, the United Nations Security Council passed United Nations Security Council Resolution 1973, authorizing the use of "all necessary means" to protect civilians in Libya, "excluding a foreign occupation force". On Saturday, 19 March 2011, France began enforcement of the resolution by deploying French fighter aircraft over Libyan airspace.

- First Battle of Benghazi 17–20 February
- 2011 Tripoli clashes 17–25 February. Nearby, The Guardian reported on 22 February that at Tarhouna, "Military (the 7th and 9th brigade) have joined the people and denounced the regime."
- Battle of Misrata 18 February – 15 May
- First Battle of Zawiya 24 February – 10 March
- 2011 Nafusa Mountain Campaign 1 March – 18 August
- First Battle of Brega 2 March
- Battle of Ra's Lanuf 4–12 March
- Battle of Bin Jawad 6 March
- Second Battle of Brega 13–15 March
- Battle of Ajdabiya 15–26 March
- Second Battle of Benghazi 19–20 March
- First Gulf of Sidra offensive 26–30 March
- Third Battle of Brega 31 March – 7 April
- Cyrenaican desert campaign 3 April – 12 June
- Battle of Brega–Ajdabiya road 8 April – 21 May
- Battle of Wazzin 20 April – 29 July
- Battle of the Misrata frontline 16 May – 19 August
- 2011 Sabha clashes 8–13 June
- Zliten uprising 9–16 June
- Zawiya raid 11–12 June
- Battle of Zliten 21 July – 19 August
- Fourth Battle of Brega 14 July – 22 August
- Fezzan campaign 17 July – 27 September
- 2011 Msallata clashes 3–9 August
- Battle of Tawergha 11–13 August
- Battle of Gharyan 13–18 August
- Second Battle of Zawiya 13–20 August
- 2011 Ras Ajdir clashes 13–26 August
- 2011 Libyan rebel coastal offensive 13–28 August
- Douz skirmish 19–20 August
- Battle of Tripoli 20–28 August
- Second Gulf of Sidra offensive 22 August – 20 October (End of the Libyan civil war)
- Battle of Bani Walid 9 September – 17 October
- Battle of Sirte 20 October

== Strength ==
In 2009 the International Institute for Strategic Studies estimated that the Ground Forces of the Libyan Arab Jamahiriya numbered 25,000 with an additional, estimated, 25,000 conscripts (total estimated 50,000).

The IISS estimated that the ground forces were organised into 11 border defence and 4 security zones, one regime security brigade (the 32nd Khamis Brigade), 10 tank battalions, 10 mechanised infantry battalions, 18 infantry battalions, 6 commando battalions, 22 artillery battalions, 4 surface-to-surface missile brigades and 7 air defence artillery battalions.

Doctrine was a mixture of Egyptian doctrine which was adopted after the 1969 coup and socialist principles derived from the concepts of a People's Army.

== Equipment ==
=== Tanks and armored fighting vehicles ===
Model	Image	Origin	Type	Quantity	Details
Tanks
T-72		Soviet Union	Main battle tank	200	115 in storage prior to the 2011 Libyan civil war.
T-62		Soviet Union	Main battle tank	100	70 in storage prior to the 2011 Libyan civil war.
T-55		Soviet Union	Medium tank	500	1,040 T-54/55 in storage prior to the 2011 Libyan civil war.
Reconnaissance vehicles
BRDM-2		Soviet Union	Armored scout car	50	
EE-9 Cascavel		Brazil	Armored scout car	70	
Infantry fighting vehicles
BMP-1		Soviet Union	Infantry fighting vehicle	1,000	
BMD-1		Soviet Union	Airborne infantry fighting vehicle		
Armored personnel carriers
M113		United States	Tracked armored personnel carrier	28	
BTR-50		Soviet Union	Tracked armored personnel carrier		750 BTR-50/60 prior to the 2011 Libyan civil war.
BTR-60		Soviet Union	Wheeled armored personnel carrier		750 BTR-50/60 prior to the 2011 Libyan civil war.
EE-11 Urutu		Brazil	Wheeled armored personnel carrier	100	
OT-64 SKOT		Czechoslovakia; Poland	Wheeled armored personnel carrier	67	

=== Artillery ===
In 2011, the IISS estimated that Libya had more than 2,421 artillery pieces including 444 self-propelled guns, more than 647 towed artillery pieces, 830 multiple rocket launchers, and 500 mortars. A significant amount was put into storage prior to the 2011 civil war.

The IISS also estimated that Libya had 45 FROG-7 tactical ballistic missile launchers in service.

In the 1990s, Libya purchased an estimated number between 5 and 100 Hwasong-6 missiles from North Korea. The Libyan government was also interested in buying Hwasong-7 missiles, but apparently never did.

After Gaddafi voluntarily renounced his weapons of mass destruction program in 2003, all Hwasong-6 missiles were scrapped, while Libya was allowed to keep its stockpile of FROG-7 and Scud-B missiles.

Model	Image	Origin	Caliber	Quantity	Details
Self-propelled artillery
2S1 Gvozdika		Soviet Union	122 mm	130	Widely used in the 2011 Libyan civil war.
2S3 Akatsiya		Soviet Union	152 mm	60	Most were retired and stored in the 1990s
152mm SpGH DANA		Czechoslovakia	152 mm	80	Retired in the 1990s and placed in storage
M109		United States	155 mm	14	Delivered before Gaddafi's coup in 1969. Stored.
Palmaria		Italy	155 mm	160	Widely used in the 2011 Libyan civil war.
Towed artillery
M101 howitzer		United States	105 mm	42+	In storage.
D30 howitzer		Soviet Union	122 mm	190	
D-74		Soviet Union	122 mm	60	
M-46		Soviet Union	130 mm	330	Stored in the 1990s.
M1937		Soviet Union	152 mm	25	Stored in the 1990s.
Multiple rocket launchers
Type 63		China	107 mm	300	
BM-11		North Korea	122 mm	200	
BM-21		Soviet Union	122 mm	230	
RM-70		Czechoslovakia	122 mm	100	Retired and placed in storage in the 1990s
Type 63 130mm multiple rocket launcher		China	130 mm		Most were stored prior to the 2011 Libyan civil war.
Mortars
82-BM-37		Soviet Union	82 mm	428	
120-PM-43 mortar		Soviet Union	120 mm	48	
M-160 mortar		Soviet Union	160 mm	24	
Tactical ballistic missiles
9K52 Luna-M		Soviet Union		45	
Scud-B Scud-C		Soviet Union; North Korea		80 launchers and 500 missiles Up to 12 launchers and 100 missiles	Scud-C stockpiles were scrapped after 2003

=== Anti-tank weapons ===
Model	Image	Origin	Caliber	Quantity	Details
Tank destroyers
9P122		Soviet Union	125 mm	40	
Anti-tank guided missiles
9M14 Malyutka		Soviet Union	125 mm	620	
9K111 Fagot		Soviet Union	120 mm		Prior to the 2011 civil war the IISS estimated the Libyan army had 1,940 Fagot and Konkurs missiles.
9M113 Konkurs		Soviet Union	135 mm		Prior to the 2011 civil war the IISS estimated the Libyan army had 1,940 Fagot and Konkurs missiles.
MILAN		France; West Germany	115 mm	400	
9M133 Kornet		Russia	152 mm		Purchased prior to the 2011 Libyan civil war.
9M123 Khrizantema		Russia	150 mm	150	Purchased prior to the 2011 Libyan civil war.
Recoilless rifles
M40 recoilless rifle		United States	105 mm	200	
Carl Gustav recoilless rifle		Sweden	84 mm	400	
Rocket launchers
RPG-7		Soviet Union	40 mm	2,300	

=== Anti-air weapons ===
In 1968, King Idris signed a contract with the British for the installation of an air defense system to be delivered in five years at a cost of US$300 million. The British would supply anti-air missile systems, radars, and provide training as well, but these plans were cancelled after the monarchy was overthrown in 1969, and Gaddafi sought Soviet assistance instead.

In 2011 the IISS estimated that the Libyan army operated more than 424 surface-to-air missile systems, and 490 anti-aircraft guns (both towed and self-propelled), while the Air Defense Command (established in 1973) operated more than 216 SAM systems, as well some AA guns. By 2009, Libyan land-based air defenses were largely obsolete, however they were amongst the largest in the Middle East.

Most of Libya's air defence systems were destroyed during the civil war, how much, if any, remained intact afterwards is unknown. Many of the anti-aircraft guns captured by rebel forces were turned on Libyan Army ground forces after being bolted onto pick up trucks.

Model	Image	Origin	Type	Quantity	Details
Surface-to-air missiles
Crotale		France	Short range mobile SAM	24	Operated by the Army.
S-75 Volkhov		Soviet Union	Long range towed SAM	108	NATO reporting name: SA-2 Guideline. Operated by the Air Defense Command.
S-125 Pechora		Soviet Union	Short range static SAM	36	NATO reporting name: SA-3 Goa. Operated by the Air Defense Command.
S-200 Angara/Vega/Dubna		Soviet Union	Long range static SAM		NATO reporting name: SA-5 Gammon. Operated by the Air Defense Command.
2K12 Kub		Soviet Union	Medium range mobile SAM		NATO reporting name: SA-6 Gainful. Operated by the Air Defense Command.
9K32 Strela-2		Soviet Union	Short range man-portable air defense system	400	NATO reporting name: SA-7 Grail. Operated by the Army
9K33 Osa		Soviet Union	Short range mobile SAM		NATO reporting name: SA-8 Gecko. Operated by the Air Defense Command.
9K31 Strela-1		Soviet Union	Short range mobile SAM		NATO reporting name: SA-9 Gaskin. Operated by the Army.
9K35 Strela-10		Soviet Union	Short range mobile SAM		NATO reporting name: SA-13 Gopher. Operated by the Army.
9K338 Igla-S		Russia	Short range SAM	482	NATO reporting name: SA-24 Grinch. Purchased in 2004 and delivered between 2006 and 2008 for vehicle mounted launchers.
Anti-aircraft guns
ZPU-2		Soviet Union	14.5×144 mm towed anti-aircraft gun	100	
ZU-23-2		Soviet Union	23 mm towed anti-aircraft gun		
Bofors 40 mm Automatic Gun L/70		Sweden	40 mm towed anti-aircraft gun	50	Sold by Yugoslavia
AZP S-60		Soviet Union	57 mm towed anti-aircraft gun	90	
ZSU-23-4		Soviet Union	23 mm self-propelled anti-aircraft gun	250	
M53/59 Praga		Czechoslovakia	30 mm self-propelled anti-aircraft gun		

=== Small arms ===
Small arms reported in service included Cold War era-vintage such as: Makarov and TT pistols; Škorpion and Beretta M12 submachine guns; AK-47, AKM, and vz. 58 assault rifles; SKS, FN FAL and Heckler & Koch G3 rifles; RPD, RPK, FN MAG and DShK machine guns.

After international sanctions were lifted in 2003 and 2004, Libya purchased more modern firearms from Belgium and Russia, including: FN Five-seven pistols, FN P90 submachine guns, plus FN F2000 and AK-103 assault rifles.

== Bibliography ==
- Bechtol, Bruce E. (October 2010). Defiant Failed State: The North Korean Threat to International Security. Potomac Books, Inc. ISBN 978-1-59797-531-5.
- Cordesman, Anthony H. (2004). The Military Balance in the Middle East. Bloomsbury Publishing USA. ISBN 978-0-313-02676-8.
- Cordesman, Anthony H; Nerguizian, Aram (2009). The North African military balance: force developments in the Maghreb. Washington, D.C.: The CSIS Press. ISBN 978-0-89206-552-3.
- Curtis, Glenn E.; Library of Congress, Federal Research Division (1992). Yugoslavia : a country study (PDF). Washington, D.C.: Federal Research Division, Library of Congress : For sale by the Supt. of Docs., U.S. G.P.O., [1992].
- Ezell, Edward Clinton (1988). Small arms today: latest reports on the world's weapons and ammunition (2nd ed.). Harrisburg, PA: Stackpole Books. ISBN 978-0-8117-2280-3.
- International Institute for Strategic Studies (2011). The Military Balance 2011. Routledge. ISBN 978-1-85743-606-8.
- Jones, Richard D; Ness, Leland S., eds. (2010). Jane's Infantry Weapons 2010−2011. Coulsdon, Surrey: Jane's Information Group. ISBN 978-0-7106-2908-1.
- Metz, Helen Chapin; Library of Congress, Federal Research Division (1989). Libya : a country study (PDF). Washington, D.C.: Federal Research Division, Library of Congress : For sale by the Supt. of Docs., U.S. G.P.O., 1989.
- Powell, Nathaniel K. (17 December 2020). France's Wars in Chad: Military Intervention and Decolonization in Africa. Cambridge University Press. ISBN 978-1-108-48867-9.
- St. John, Ronald Bruce (15 March 2023). Historical Dictionary of Libya. Rowman & Littlefield Publishers. ISBN 9781538157428.
