= Piotr Iwaszkiewicz =

Polish diplomat and historian (1959–2021)

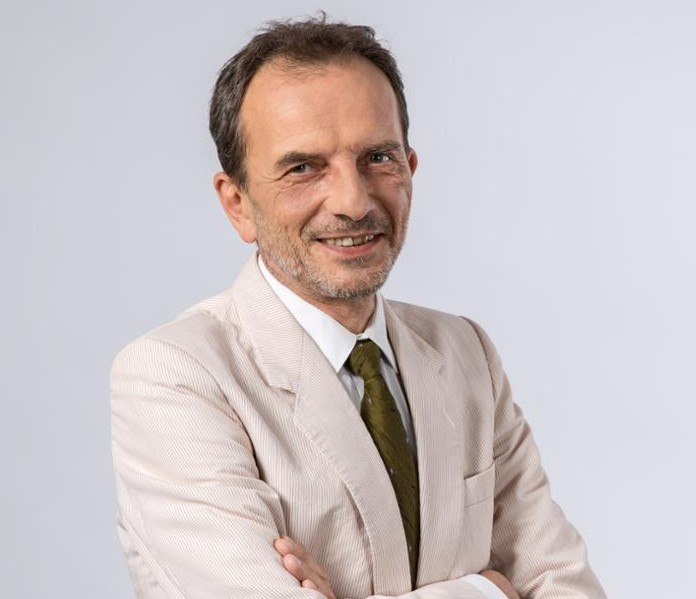

4th Poland Ambassador to Uzbekistan
- In office 23 October 2015 – 31 October 2020
- Preceded by: Marian Przeździecki
- Succeeded by: Radosław Gruk

Personal details
- Born: 2 December 1959 Lublin, Polish People's Republic
- Died: 12 December 2021 (aged 62) Grodzisk Mazowiecki, Poland
- Children: six
- Parent(s): Aleksander, Krystyna
- Education: University of Warsaw
- Profession: Historian, translator, diplomat

Piotr Ignacy Iwaszkiewicz (2 December 1959, in Lublin – 12 December 2021, in Grodzisk Mazowiecki) was a Polish political historian, translator and diplomat, serving as ambassador to Uzbekistan (2015–2020).

== Life ==
Piotr Iwaszkiewicz was born in 1959 in Lublin. In 1984, he earned his master's degree in classical philology at the University of Warsaw, Faculty of History. Between 1980 and 1983 he was president of the Faculty students' union. Between 1981 and 1992 he was member of the Solidarity trade union.

After graduating, between 1984 and 1992 he was lecturing history of early Christianity, late Roman and Byzantine literature at the University of Warsaw. He authored two books and several translations from Greek and Latin languages.

In 1992 Iwaszkiewicz joined the Ministry of Foreign Affairs, specializing in relations with Eastern Europe countries, security issues and human rights. In 1994 he became member of Organization for Security and Co-operation in Europe mission to Armenia and Nagorno-Karabakh. From 1996 to 1998 he was head of the OSCE Press and Public Relations Office in Tbilisi, and later a Human Rights and Media Officer in Ashgabat (1999–2000). Following being chargé d'affaires of the Polish embassy in Tbilisi (2001) and Yerevan (2001–2003), he was deputy head of mission in Almaty (2003–2005). After that he was deputy director of the MFA Eastern Department. In 2009 he was responsible for organizing PERN Przyjazn SA office in Baku. Between May 2011 and June 2012 he was heading the MFA Department of Development Cooperation. He was in charge of organizing Polish medical mission to Misrata. Since June 2012 he was head of the MFA Central Asia and North Caucaus Unit.

On 23 October 2015 Iwaszkiewicz became Poland ambassador to Uzbekistan, he presented his credentials to the President Islam Karimov on 25 June 2016. He was accredited also to Tajikistan. He ended his term on 31 October 2020. Afterwards, he worked at the MFA Eastern Department, being responsible for relations with Russia.

He was father to six children.

== Works ==
- Do Ziemi Świętej: najstarsze opisy pielgrzymek do Ziemi Świętej (IV–VIII w.), Kraków: WAM – Księża Jezuici, 1996, ISBN 978-83-7505-183-4.
- Władcy i wodzowie starożytności: słownik, Warszawa: Wydawnictwa Szkolne i Pedagogiczne, 1998, ISBN 83-02-06971-X.
