= Battle of Misrata (2011) =

Battle of the 2011 Libyan Civil War

Coordinates: 32°22′39.12″N 15°5′31.26″E

- Part of the Libyan Civil War
- Changes in frontlines during the Battle of Misrata
Date	18 February – 15 May 2011
Location	Misrata, Libya
Result	Anti-Gaddafi victory; Rebels take full control of the entire city.; Port reopens after it was partially closed due to artillery fire and mines from 29 April to 9 May; All of the city's public utilities shut down; Rebels advance to Dafniya, west of Misrata, and the outskirts of Tawergha, south of Misrata

Belligerents
(Libya) Anti-Gaddafi forces; National Liberation Army; Foreign military advisors; NATO; France; United Kingdom; United States; Canada	(Libya) Libyan Arab Jamahiriya; (Libya) Gaddafi Loyalists; Pro-Gaddafi Armed Forces; Pro-Gaddafi Army; Elements of the Khamis Brigade; Libyan Navy; Foreign mercenaries

Commanders and leaders
(Libya) Ibrahim Baitulmal (Libya) Nuri Abdullah Abdul latif (Libya) Salah Badi (Libya) Ali Attalah Obeidi †	(Libya) Khamis Gaddafi (from 12 March) (Libya) Nabih Zayid (Libya) Albarrani Shkal

Strength
3,000–5,000	Hamza Brigade (initially); Khamis Brigade (since 12 March): 8,000

Casualties and losses
1,215 killed* 900 missing or captured** 4,000 wounded 1+ tank destroyed	358 killed 150–230 captured 24 tanks destroyed (20 T-72s, 4 T-55s); 2 IFVs destroyed 1 Shilka destroyed 3 APCs destroyed 1 IMR-2 destroyed 1 helicopter shot down 32–44 tanks destroyed or damaged 1 Shilka destroyed 1 MRLs destroyed 6 Soko G-2 Galeb aircraft destroyed 2 attack helicopters destroyed 1 patrol boat destroyed 1 coast guard vessel damaged 1 patrol boat damaged (by Coalition forces, UN/NATO claim)
- *The number of dead on the rebel side includes both opposition fighters and civilians, of which at least 358 have definitely been confirmed as rebels and 707 as civilians, among whom were 11 migrants, 4 journalists and 1 Ukrainian doctor **Of the missing and captured, 150 civilians were found dead in a mass grave in Tawargha in mid-August and 5 in a grave near Misrata in early October and 8 rebels were found in a grave in November 2012

Destroyed loyalist BMP in Misrata

The Battle of Misrata (Arabic: معركة مصراتة), also known as the Siege of Misrata, was a battle of the First Libyan Civil War for the control of Misrata. It was fought between troops loyal to the government of Muammar Gaddafi, and anti-Gaddafi rebels who held Misrata, the third largest city in Libya. Following the initial stages of the uprising, the Libyan government retook most towns in the west of the country, leaving Misrata the only major city under rebel control in Tripolitania. The city soon became the site of one of the war's major battles and the suffering of its citizens gained worldwide attention.

The intensity of fighting, along with its strategic and symbolic importance, led to the battle being called 'Libya's Stalingrad'. During the siege, the city saw very heavy fighting, came under daily assaults and shelling, and was at times cut off from its seaport, leaving no escape route for Misrata's inhabitants. Following UN military intervention in the civil war, NATO declared that breaking the encirclement of the city was its top priority. It ranks as one of the longest and bloodiest battles of the entire war. In late April and early May, rebel counterattacks successfully retook the city, culminating in the fall of the airport and the nearby military airbase on 11 May.

== The battle ==
=== Rebels capture the city; battle at the air base ===
18–26 February

Anti-government demonstrators numbering a few dozen began staging protests on 17 February (other reports indicate 19 February). Several protesters were arrested, triggering larger protests, which government forces responded to by opening fire on demonstrators. These confrontations soon escalated into general armed violence. By 23 February, the opposition had driven government forces out of Misrata, and were in full control of the city. Six to 14 protesters were killed in the clashes, and another 200 wounded.

On 24 February, Gaddafi loyalists armed with rocket-propelled grenades and mortars fired at a group of opposition fighters guarding the airport. As the fighting began, officers from an air force school near the airport mutinied and helped the opposition attack an adjacent military air base. The officers then disabled fighter jets at the base to prevent them from being used against the uprising. The rebels also used a captured ZPU-4 anti-aircraft gun against the loyalists.

On the evening of the second day of the battle, Gaddafi's forces, supported by tanks, succeeded in retaking part of the military air base. Fighting at the base continued until after midnight, leaving 22 dead. At least one loyalist tank was destroyed during the two days of fighting at the airport.

28 February

On 28 February, it was reported that opposition forces had shot down and captured the crew of a government helicopter which had been attacking the rebel-held radio station. Also, a new attempt by government troops to advance on the air base was repelled by opposition fighters. No casualties occurred during the fighting, although eight loyalist soldiers were captured.

3 March

On 3 March, two Libyan Red Crescent medics were wounded by loyalist fire while trying to retrieve the body of a man killed near a government base three days earlier. It was reported that the rebels were running low on food and ammunition, and that government troops had secured the air base and the military air academy on the outskirts of Misrata.

=== Rebel ambush in the city center ===
6 March

On 6 March, pro-Gaddafi forces attempted to retake Misrata, and sent soldiers supported by seven tanks and 25 technicals into the city. The rebels allowed the government forces to enter the city, so that they could be surrounded and captured. Three tanks penetrated to the city center and became trapped as fighting began. According to local witnesses, the rebels fended off the attack, with twenty-one rebels and civilians killed, including a 3-year-old boy. Twenty-two of Gaddafi's soldiers were reported killed, and another 20 captured.

=== Khamis Brigade arrives; inter-loyalist fighting ===
12–13 March

On 12 March a new government attack got underway, and loyalist forces were reported to be 10–15 kilometers from the city center. The attack was led by the Khamis Brigade, which had won the First Battle of Zawiya two days earlier, but their advance came to a halt when 32 soldiers, one of them reportedly a general, broke off from the rest of the force and joined the rebels in the city.

The next day, government tanks were still advancing, fighting rebels on the outskirts of the city. Tank shells had struck inside the city, hitting a mosque and an apartment building.

=== Artillery and tank attacks ===
16–18 March

On 16 March, artillery pounded Misrata as a new round of fighting commenced. The rebels claimed to have destroyed 16 loyalist tanks and captured 20 government soldiers. None of the claims were independently confirmed. Eighteen opposition members were killed and 20 wounded during the clashes, while doctors in Misrata reported that 60–80 government soldiers had been killed in the day's fighting.

On the night of 17 March, government troops began an artillery and tank attack which continued well into the next day. On 18 March a cease-fire was announced by the government, following the United Nations Security council resolution on authorisation for military intervention by foreign countries; the attack on Misrata, however, continued for at least another four hours. It was not known if this was deliberate, or if orders had simply not gotten to the troops in the city yet. By the time the cease-fire was ordered, government troops had already breached rebel defenses on the outskirts of the city and were in Misrata itself, with, according to the rebels, tanks firing randomly and troops conducting house-to-house searches for opposition fighters. Video from the city itself showed heavily damaged streets and at least six destroyed tanks and armored personnel carriers.

=== City is breached and fighting continues ===
19–22 March

On the morning of 19 March, loyalist sniper and artillery fire left nine dead in the city. The same day, Tomahawk cruise missiles launched by US and British naval vessels struck a government-held air base and military academy outside the city, causing an undetermined amount of damage.

On 20 March, Gaddafi's armour drove into the city center, and heavy fighting continued throughout the day. Four loyalist tanks were seen patrolling the city.

On 21 March 40 people were reportedly killed and 300 wounded by gunfire and artillery shelling as loyalist forces attempted to clear the city of opposition forces. The city's main road, Tripoli Street, leading from the highway on the southwestern outskirts to the city center, was secured by 200 government troops supported by three tanks. The center of the city was cleared of rebel forces. During the day, unarmed rebel supporters attempted to stage a demonstration, but were fired upon as soon as they approached government troops. That night, a government spokesperson stated that the city was under control of forces loyal to Muammar Gaddafi. There was no independent confirmation, and the claim was denied by an opposition spokesperson in Misrata. Video from fighting during the previous days showed six destroyed government tanks and armored personnel carriers.

On 22 March, artillery shelling and sniper fire in Misrata continued. In the earlier hours of the day, five people, including four children, were killed by an artillery round as they tried leaving their home. Gaddafi's forces concentrated around an abandoned hospital which they used as a base. Overnight, Gaddafi's forces managed to capture the main hospital in Misrata, and positioned snipers on top of it. The opposition requested a hospital ship to be sent to Misrata's port, the only part of the city still in firm rebel control, to treat the injured, as the injured no longer had a place to go.

=== Coalition air-strikes; tanks continue to advance ===
23–29 March

In the early hours of 23 March, coalition forces began launching air-strikes against pro-Gaddafi forces in and around Misrata. According to witnesses, Gaddafi's forces stopped shelling the city after two NATO air-strikes. Opposition members claimed that the strikes destroyed numerous loyalist tanks near the captured hospital and on the outskirts of the city; the next day, however, witnesses confirmed that only tanks on the outskirts had been bombed, the damage being unknown, while those in the city had not been hit.

Gaddafi's forces left the main hospital, then returned in the evening with tanks and artillery weapons, and began bombarding the surrounding area. Troops were said to be advancing on the hospital where most of the opposition wounded were being treated. That night, the regime sent warships to capture Misrata's port.

The next day there were unconfirmed reports that the warships had retreated from the port, which had then been re-secured by the rebels. The same day, a Libyan Air Force Soko G-2 Galeb was destroyed by French fighter jets at an air base near Misrata. A French armed forces spokesman confirmed that the plane had been destroyed by an AASM air-to-ground missile just after it had landed. Rebels in Misrata also claimed to have killed 30 pro-Gaddafi snipers, and to have reached the town center.

On 25 March the city was hit by more shelling. That evening, about a dozen loyalist tanks appeared on Tripoli Street and fired on rebel positions before retreating to avoid Coalition planes. There was ongoing confusion as to whether the port had been recaptured by the rebels or was still being blocked by loyalist ships.

On 26 March, Gaddafi's forces launched a large-scale attack on Misrata, bombarding the city with mortars and tanks and allegedly sending in foreign mercenaries. Witnesses described the situation as "very, very dire". As on previous days, firing stopped and the tanks pulled back to cover when coalition planes appeared overhead. The French Ministry of Defense claimed that their fighters destroyed five G-2 Galeb ground attack jets and two Mi-35 attack helicopters at the Misrata airbase while they were preparing to take part in offensive operations against rebels in the city.

Gaddafi's forces resumed artillery, mortar, and tank shelling of the city the next day, 27 March. Nine people were reported killed and 23 wounded as loyalist troops advanced on the city from the west. In the evening, as previously, the fighting stopped so loyalist forces could avoid coalition air-strikes.

On 28 March, at noon, Gaddafi's forces began bombarding the city again. Later, a rebel source confirmed that loyalist troops had gained control of part of the city, effectively dividing Misrata into government-held and rebel-held areas. During the fighting, rebels damaged two loyalist tanks. Just before evening, international journalists arriving from Tripoli confirmed that Misrata's suburbs, including Tripoli Street, were under government control. A military officer stated that there were still about 100 rebels left, and that fighting was concentrated around the center of the town. CNN's Nic Robertson reported that the streets of Misrata were largely empty, except for about 100 pro-Gaddafi supporters demonstrating, and a strong military presence. Al Jazeera's Anita McNaught said that the furthest point in Misrata that she and other international journalists were taken to was the south side of Tripoli Street, one and a half miles from the city's center, from where gunfire could be heard. The British Ministry of Defense claimed that their planes hit and destroyed two loyalist tanks and two armored vehicles near the city.

On 29 March, loyalist forces, including the Khamis Brigade, swept through the city, securing the western and northwestern parts. Witnesses reported that government troops were forcing people from their homes en masse. A member of the rebel command in the city claimed that loyalist forces were killing and wounding civilians indiscriminately. During the night, heavy street fighting occurred in the city's Az-Zawaabi district, in which nine rebels were killed and five wounded.

=== Battles for the city center and port ===
30 March – 16 April

Rebels during street fighting

On 30 March a CNN news crew managed to get into Misrata, and recorded scenes of heavy fighting in the city. Their report showed heavily damaged streets, a destroyed government armored personnel carrier, a government tank being hit by an RPG, and wounded civilians in the main hospital.

On 31 March a local doctor, who was a member of the opposition, claimed that Gaddafi's forces only retained control of Tripoli Street; this claim, however, could not be confirmed. Gaddafi forces were using artillery to bombard Misrata, according to a rebel spokesman, who further stated that 20 civilians had been killed the previous day when houses were hit by shells.

On 1 April, Gaddafi's forces attempted to advance toward the city center via Tripoli Street. Their attack was repelled, after which heavy mortar, artillery, tank, and RPG fire hit the center. A doctor in the city stated that the port had come under loyalist control, and that the rebels were holding out only in the center of the city; nevertheless, it seemed part of the port was still in rebel hands, as a fishing trawler from Malta was able to unload much needed supplies for the besieged city. During the day, a Coalition air-strike hit and destroyed a loyalist ammunition convoy consisting of a tank and several military trucks.

On 2 April, spokespersons from the rebels' side gave a comprehensive report via video. Due to the difficulty of getting journalists into Misrata, little in their report could be independently confirmed. The rebels said that NATO airstrikes that day focused mainly on the Abdul Raouf neighborhood, in the southern part of Misrata. They also said they had fought Gaddafi's forces in Souwa, the western part of Misrata, where they claimed to have destroyed one tank and killed six loyalist soldiers. According to the rebels, snipers had left the insurance building, from which they had been sniping for days, and relocated to the courthouse. The rebels had clashed with the snipers as they tried to move, reportedly killing two of them. The rebels then surrounded the courthouse from three sides. At 3:30 PM ships from Qatar docked at the port to deliver supplies; a Turkish ship also docked, and took approximately 250 wounded people from Misrata to be treated in Turkey. The arrival of the Turkish ship was the only piece of information to be independently confirmed.

On 3 April, according to a witness in the city's Al Qalaa section, the rebels attacked Gaddafi's forces in the Taghma area at around five in the morning, forcing them to retreat to the Jfara district after a five-hour battle. Subsequently, Gaddafi's forces in Jfara fired Grad missiles into the Al Qalaa neighborhood, destroying civilian structures and causing residents to flee. The rebels claimed to have killed 26 loyalist troops in the fighting, among them 9 snipers. A rebel spokesman was quoted as saying that the central city hospital had been bombarded, resulting in one person being killed and 22 wounded. Meanwhile, 250 of the 450+ wounded waiting at Misrata's hospital were taken from the city aboard the ship M/F Ankara, which had also delivered medical supplies. A ship belonging to Doctors Without Borders also managed to take 71 wounded from Misrata to Tunis for treatment. In the evening, Gaddafi's troops shelled the port, as they had done on the previous few days, in an attempt to destroy the rebels' last lifeline to the outside world.

Around 3:00 AM on 4 April, a loyalist tank entered the city's outskirts and headed for the port area. The rebels confronted it, and after a two-hour battle the tank turned back. On this day, at least five people were killed and five critically injured by artillery shelling.

On 5 April, Interior Minister and Major General Abdul Fatah Younis, who had defected to the rebels, criticized NATO, saying it was not doing enough while civilians were dying every day. Younis stated that sewage was being re-routed into water wells by Gaddafi' forces, and that water supplies were running desperately short.

On 7 April, loyalist artillery caused the port to be temporarily closed by the rebels for all incoming ships. By this point, the rebels were only in firm control of the northern and eastern parts of the city, and the port area. British relief and humanitarian aid ships carrying vital supplies for Misrata managed to dock and unload at the port. At the same time, rebels battled snipers on Tripoli Street, where they claimed to have been able to drive some of them back.

On 8 April, loyalist forces conducted an attack against the eastern part of the city, advancing into the Esqeer district. After heavy fighting, they pulled back. At the same time, rebels said, they had cut off government snipers in the city center from the rest of their forces by barricading Tripoli Street with large shipping containers filled with sand and stone. They also claimed to have blown up the lower levels of the multi-storey Ta'ameen building, thus trapping dozens of loyalist snipers in the upper levels. According to the rebels, the loyalists responded to the attempted blockade of Tripoli Street by deploying one or two tanks on the main road. Later in the day, loyalist troops conducted another attack, this time attempting to take full control of the Nakl al-Theqeel road, which links central Misrata to its port on the northeastern outskirts of the city. The fighting for the road continued well into the evening.

UNICEF confirmed that children had been targeted and killed by pro-Gaddafi snipers throughout the battle. The European Union stated that it was prepared to launch a humanitarian mission in Misrata which might require deployment of ground forces, but only with UN backing.

On 9 April, loyalist forces continued their assault on the city, advancing from three directions. Tripoli Street, the port road, and the Kharouba neighbourhood came under attack. The loyalist offensive was ultimately repelled, at the cost of a reported 18–30 opposition fighters killed. The same day, a government-minded tour of international reporters to Misrata came under rebel sniper fire, in which one military officer guiding the reporters was wounded. On the outskirts of the city the reporters saw at least two tanks which appeared to have been destroyed by RPG fire. An anonymous NATO official claimed that coalition forces had destroyed 15 loyalist tanks and damaged nine more in and around Misrata over the previous two days, of which five were destroyed by British planes. There was no independent confirmation of the claims, though footage of one tank being destroyed had surfaced. The next day, witnesses confirmed more tank fire in the city.

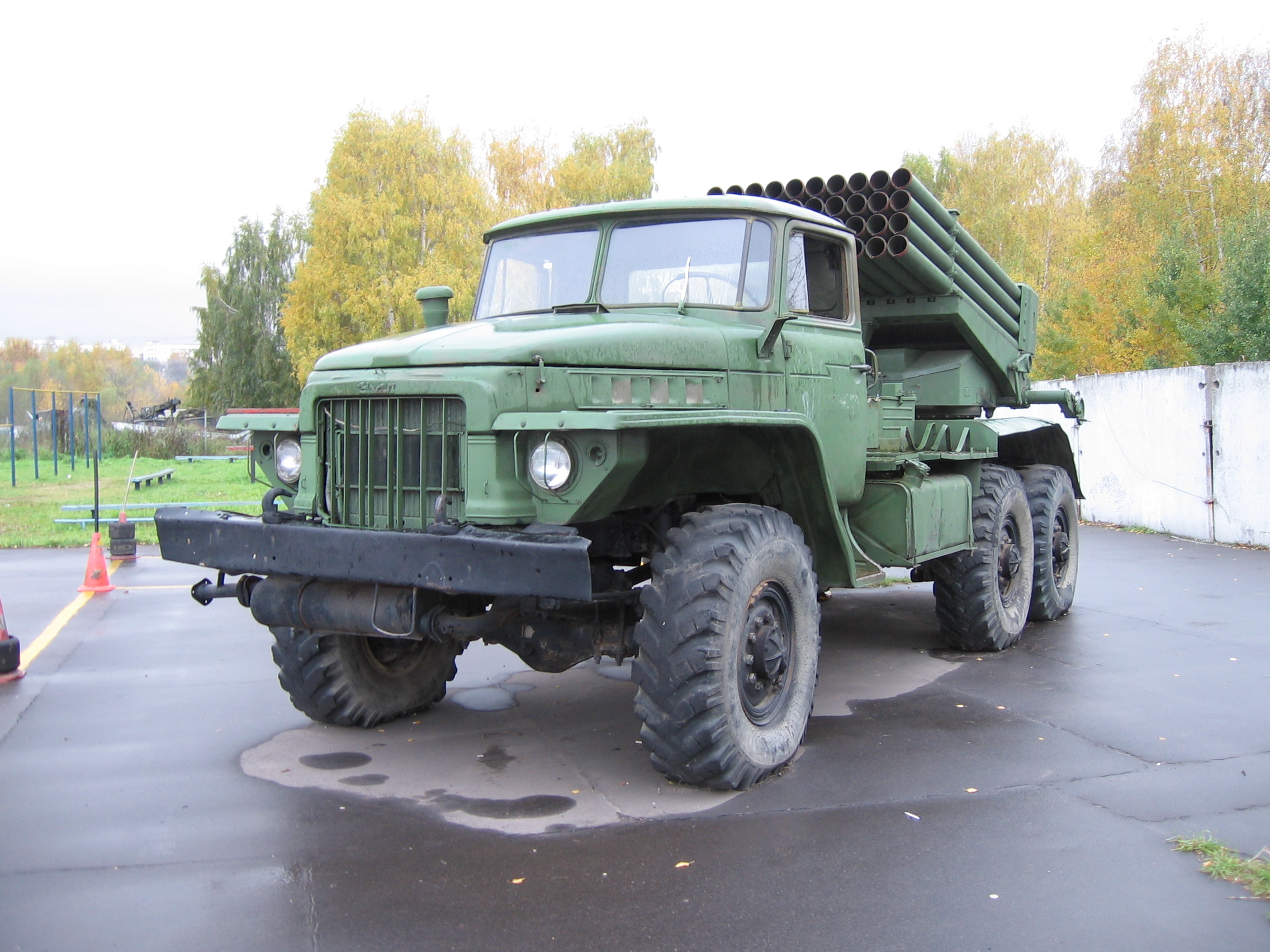
BM-21s like this one were used to launch Grad rockets on the city.

On 11 April, rebels reported that the city was under heavy attack, with more than 140 shells landing in an area near the city center. They also stated that Gaddafi's forces were, for the first time, using Grad multiple rocket launchers in the city. Heavy fighting took place at the eastern entrance and in the city center. Libyan state TV showed a pro-Gaddafi rally on the outskirts of the city, and six people were killed during the day by shelling, including a child.

On 12 April, news outlets aired video of the destruction on Tripoli Street, showing a destroyed tank, buildings heavily damaged or destroyed, and the road on fire. The rebels announced that they had repelled two attacks by Gaddafi's forces and continued to hold their positions, notably on the road in the direction of the port.

On 13 April, rebels claimed to have pushed Gaddafi's forces on the western front 10 km back to Abu Ruwaya, although these reports couldn't be verified due to the lack of journalists. Rebels also claimed to have captured 12 loyalist soldiers in fighting on the main street.

On 14 April, rebels claimed that pro-Gaddafi forces had fired dozens of Grad rockets on a residential area near the port, killing at least 23 civilians and wounding 100; they also said that five civilians had been killed and 37 wounded in rocket attacks the previous day. Rebel spokesmen expressed fear of a massacre in Misrata if NATO did not intervene strongly. Also on the 14th, artillery fire prevented a Qatari ship from docking in the port. The harbor was later closed, due to extensive damage from some 200 Grad missiles hitting the port area.

On 15 April, loyalist forces began their heaviest attack on the city yet. Rebels said that government forces shelled the road to the port during the morning, killing at least eight people. From dawn to dusk government troops pounded the city with tanks, artillery, Grad rockets, mortars, and, allegedly, cluster bombs. (The use of cluster bombs, which are banned under international law in civilian-populated zones, was also claimed by Human Rights Watch.) Troops and tanks entered the city and heavy street fighting raged. For three hours during the day a loyalist helicopter was seen flying over the city, in defiance of the no-fly zone, spotting targets for the artillery. The loyalists battled their way to the city center and took control of it, while the rebels clung to the port area and set up checkpoints around one neighborhood where a net of government snipers was positioned. Rebel-held neighborhoods were becoming increasingly crowded with civilians fleeing advancing loyalist troops. In all, 16 people were reported killed during the day.

Heavy shelling continued on 16 April, with rockets hitting the industrial area close to the port killing six people, including three rebels, and wounding more than 48. More video from the city showed rebels using a mobile anti-tank gun against loyalists, a street in flames, and a loyalist combat engineering vehicle destroyed.

=== Rebel gains, loyalist withdrawal ===
17–24 April

On 17 April, street fighting and shelling by Gaddafi forces killed 25 people, both rebels and civilians, and wounded 100. During the day's fighting, the rebels managed to evict loyalist forces from the shoe factory, from which they had been bombarding residential areas in the city, and later burned it down so that it couldn't be used again by government troops. They attempted to expand their territory around a central produce market, and claimed that they had destroyed several tanks and pushed Gaddafi's forces from Tripoli Street to the Al Gharyan neighborhood in southern Misrata, leaving most of the nearby main road in rebel hands. Meanwhile, video emerged of 22 loyalist T-55 tanks destroyed or damaged, presumably by NATO air-strikes, at a compound in Misrata. Given that the tanks in the video were bunched together, and were old models, the possibility exists that they were non-operational before the strikes.

On 18 April, the European Union was contemplating the deployment of up to 1,000 troops for a non-combat ground mission in Misrata, and was reportedly waiting for a non-resolution UN approval. The death toll of 17 April's artillery attack had risen to 25, as some of those injured died from their wounds. Four civilians also died on 18 April from artillery attacks. In the meantime, killings of unarmed migrant workers by rebels were being reported. A British reporter (Kim Sengupta of "The Independent"), who had just arrived at Benghazi by sea from Misrata, described the sufferings of large numbers of migrant workers trapped in Misrata in a broadcast on BBC Radio 4. After mentioning casualties during attacks by government forces, he said that some migrant workers "have also died in clashes with the rebel fighters. They were protesting about their conditions, demanding that they be repatriated, and on a couple of occasions this has led to the rebels opening fire and people dying."

By 20 April, half of Tripoli Street was reported to be under loyalist control while the other half was in rebel hands. Later in the day it was reported that the rebels from the east had managed to insert a ten-man team with 164 anti-tank weapons into the city. Rebel Kamal Hodaifa reported that the team's purpose was to train rebels in anti-tank tactics. Two photojournalists, Tim Hetherington (known for co-directing the Oscar-nominated documentary Restrepo) and Chris Hondros, were killed in a mortar attack on 20 April while photographing rebel soldiers close to the front lines. In addition to the two journalists, seven Libyan civilians and one Ukrainian doctor were killed on the 20th.

On the morning of 21 April, three rebels were killed and 17 wounded by mortar fire. The rebels managed to take the local insurance building, the tallest building in the city, which snipers had been using as a platform. Of the seven snipers that were in the building, two were killed, three were captured, and two escaped. Several destroyed government tanks were around the building. Al Jazeera Arabic reported that the rebels were in control of most of the western part of Misrata. The Guardian and the BBC could confirm that northwestern Misrata was under rebel control, but said the southwestern part was still in loyalist hands. Later in the day, rebels attempting to attack a building occupied by loyalist soldiers were ambushed by government troops in the surrounding buildings, leaving four rebels dead. In all, nine rebels were killed during the day.

On 22 April, the deputy foreign minister of Gaddafi's government stated that the Libyan army would be withdrawing from Misrata. He was quoted as saying that "the situation in Misrata will be dealt with by the tribes around Misurata and Misurata's residents and not by the Libyan army". This came after the rebels managed to eliminate Gaddafi's forces from several locations near the city center, which loyalist forces had been holding for several weeks.

On 23 April, the Libyan army began withdrawing from Misrata amidst sporadic fighting. Rebels captured the overpass bridge at the city's western gate, after a battle in which 13 rebels were injured and 12 wounded loyalist soldiers were captured. One injured government soldier brought to the hospital confirmed that they had received orders to retreat. The captured soldier said the rebels' victory on the bridge was due to an ambush on government soldiers as they were busy retreating, indicating that they had lost control over Misrata. The rebels initially claimed to have seized the abandoned hospital, which Gaddafi's forces had been using as a base, but an Al Jazeera correspondent later confirmed that the hospital, though being attacked by opposition forces, was still under loyalist control. Twenty-eight people were killed during the day and more than 100 wounded, due to both street fighting and booby-traps left behind by the retreating soldiers. 25 of the dead were rebels.

On 24 April a rebel spokesman said: Gaddafi’s brigades started random bombardment in the early hours of this morning. The bombardment is still going on. They targeted the city centre, mainly Tripoli Street, and three residential areas. NATO planes had been flying over, but there was no indication of air strikes. Later in the day, rebel forces captured the main hospital, where 300–400 loyalists had been holed up for weeks. Pro-Gaddafi forces had retreated to the outskirts of the city. At least five tanks, hidden from NATO attacks in the loading bays of the hospital, were burned by the rebels after they captured the building. Twenty people were killed in artillery strikes and fighting on the 24th, leaving a total of 48 rebels and civilians killed in the previous two days.

=== Bombardment of the city, partial port blockade, rebels re-take airport ===
25 April – 15 May

On 25 April the bombardment of the city continued, with another 30 people being killed and 60 wounded. Rebels reported the following day that Gaddafi forces bombarded the port and launched a new assault in an attempt to take control of it. As a large loyalist force was approaching the port, NATO planes struck. They hit six military vehicles and seven technicals, stopping the advance.

On 27 April, for the first time in two months, civilians were able to enter the vegetable market, where loyalist forces had been stationed for the better part of the battle. Five tanks, one mobile anti-aircraft system, and one fuel tanker were left destroyed at the market following NATO air-strikes. During the day, a NATO air-strike mistakenly hit a salt factory on the road to the port where rebels were holding a blocking position. A dozen rebels were killed and five wounded in the attack. The next day, a local doctor confirmed that during the night seven rebels had been killed and four wounded when rocket and artillery fire hit their checkpoint.

On 29 April, after securing the port and driving Gaddafi's forces back to the outskirts of Misrata, rebels began attacking the airport. However, loyalist tanks conducted an assault against the southwestern outskirts of the city, particularly the village of Zawiyat al-Mahjoub, where some 50 rebel fighters were concentrated. Fifteen people were killed and 80 wounded in the day's fighting, the majority of them rebels. During the day, pro-Gaddafi forces planted sea mines in front of the harbor in an attempt to blockade the port. NATO ships managed to remove two of them, but a third drifted free and NATO forces were not able to find it, which resulted in the port being closed for all maritime traffic.

On 30 April, several callers speaking to journalists reported heavy shelling of residential areas. One caller said the shelling likely came from the Air Force academy. Another caller counted over 50 explosions. Misrata came under renewed attack late at night and in the early hours of the following morning. Gaddafi's troops were seen for the first time wearing gas masks, leading to speculation that they were preparing to use chemical weapons.

On the morning of 2 May tanks tried to enter the city from al-Ghiran, a southwestern suburb near the airport. It was stated by medical sources in the city that since 24 April 110 civilians and rebels had been killed, and more than 350 wounded.

On 4 May, five people were killed by shelling in the port area. "The bombing has caused many casualties among Libyans and people of other nationalities waiting for evacuation," Gemal Salem, a spokesman for the rebels, told Reuters. "So far we have five killed and ambulances are rushing to the scene to evacuate the casualties."

On 5 May, loyalist forces dropped 20 rocket-borne anti-tank land mines onto the port, which landed via a parachute after they were released from the rockets. One patrolling rebel pick-up detonated a mine while investigating the landings, wounding two rebel fighters.

On 7 May, Gaddafi's troops used converted cropdusting planes to bomb rebel controlled oil tanks, successfully destroying all eight of them. NATO also confirmed that Gaddafi's forces had been using helicopters to drop mines into the harbour.

On 8 May, heavy fighting was reported near the airport and at the resort area of Burgueya on the city's western outskirts. Meanwhile, the rebels confirmed that for two weeks the port had been receiving only one supply ship per week, down from the previous two to five per week, due to the constant artillery shelling, sea mines floating at the entrance to the harbour, and land mines dropped on the port area. They stated that food, water, and medical supplies were reaching critically low levels, and that fuel reserves were already dangerously low due to the destruction of fuel tanks by loyalist forces the day before.

By 9 May, AFP reported that rebels had taken control of the coastal road from Misrata to the village of Dafniya, 20 km east of Zliten, and had expanded further into the southeastern areas of Misrata.

On 10 May, rebels reportedly advanced further into the Al Ghiran neighborhood, where they isolated the airport and air academy, nearly surrounding both installations.

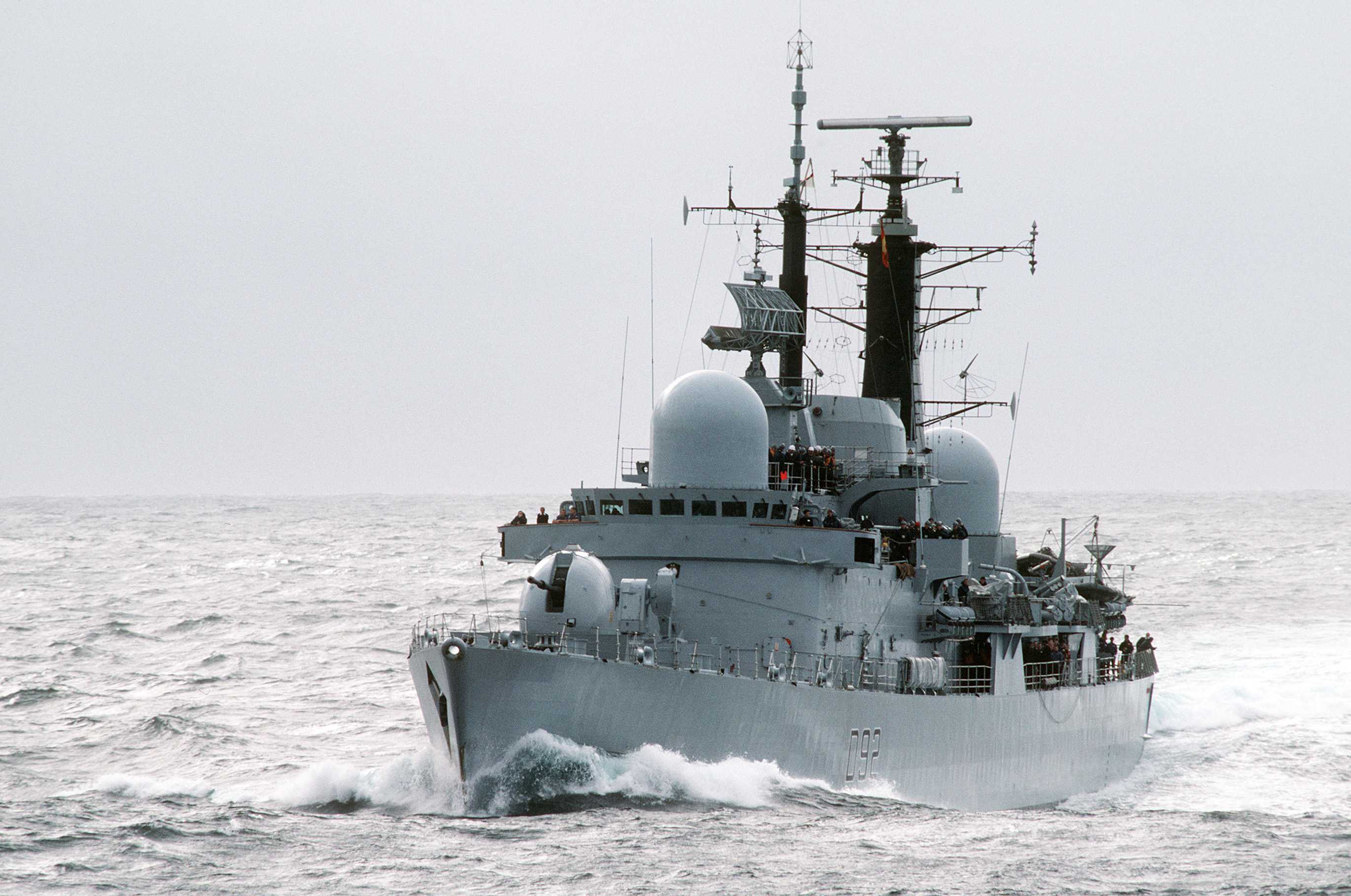
HMS Liverpool, a Type 42 destroyer of the Royal Navy that attacked Pro-Gaddafi forces at sea and on land during the Battle of Misrata

By mid-day 11 May, the AFP confirmed that the rebels had won control of the airport after a fierce fight with loyalists who were holed up in the terminal buildings. Pockets of fighting continued at the military airbase, adjacent to the civilian airport, which had come under full rebel control. The same day rebels claimed to have advanced to within 9.6 kilometres (6.0 mi) of Zliten; later, however, it would be confirmed that they were still 24 kilometres (15 mi) from the city. Rebels stated that in two days of fighting for the airport five of their fighters had been killed and 105 wounded. Hours after the airport battle, NATO stated that HMCS Charlottetown, HMS Liverpool, and a French warship had engaged a number of small, fast loyalist boats attacking the port, and that "the [loyalist] boats were forced to abandon their attack and regime forces ashore covered their retreat with artillery and anti-aircraft cannon fire directed towards the allied warships"

On 12 May at least one loyalist tank was disabled in fighting on the western outskirts of Misrata.

On 13 May, according to the opposition, all of Misrata proper was under rebel control, with clashes still occurring in the southern suburb of Hizam, the southeastern farmland of Zameena, and west of Dafniya. The next day, AFP reported that the rebels had advanced 20 km in the east to the gates of Tawergha. It also relayed rebel claims that they had reached the gates of Zliten in the west. However, there was no independent confirmation of the advances, with rebel spokesmen later backtracking on their statements of victories during the claimed two-day advance.

On 15 May, opposition forces stated they would not launch an offensive in the direction of Zliten because of the high risk of heavy casualties being sustained. The same day, rebels declared the battle for Misrata over, and that they were in full control of the city, with no more combat taking place.

On 16 May, a rebel spokesman from Benghazi claimed that opposition fighters had forced two brigades of Gaddafi's forces, based in Zliten, into open battle on the highway and defeated them. However, he contradicted himself by saying the fighting was still ongoing, and no reporters who were in the area or other independent sources confirmed the claim. It was reiterated by rebels on the ground that they would not advance on Zliten due to the possibility of a defeat, such as those sustained by the eastern rebels during their attempted advances earlier in the war.

== NATO strikes ==
According to NATO's daily "Operational Media Updates", the NATO strikes in the Misrata vicinity during the offensive hit:

12–16 April NATO strikes
Date	Tanks	Buildings	Aircraft	Vehicles
12 April	12	0	0	0
14 April	0	3 Bunkers	1 Helicopter	0
16 April	0	0	0	1 Armoured personnel carrier
Total	12	3	1	1

== Aftermath ==
Sporadic fighting continued for several weeks after the rebels established control over the city. Although there was no further combat in Misrata itself, government troops still surrounded the area on all sides, and occasionally directed artillery and rocket fire at the city. For more than a month, heavy frontline fighting and shelling raged nearby at Dafniya and Tawergha.

On 21 June, loyalists fired four Grad rockets into the centre of Misrata. It was not immediately clear if there were any casualties.

On 16 August, Libyan government spokesman Moussa Ibrahim announced that the Libyan government had retaken Misrata, although no independent media followed up the claim. Rebel controlled radio within the city of Misrata on 17 August claimed that rebel forces were advancing southwards to the town of Bani Walid, proving the Gaddafi regimes claims of capturing Misrata from the rebels to be untrue.

== Casualties ==
=== Numbers of killed and wounded ===
Reports on the numbers of people killed in the three-month siege vary. The chief of Misrata's hospital, Dr. Mohammed Fortia, stated that by 30 March 398 rebels and civilians had been killed. However, Fortia also said, at a later time, that 257 rebels and civilians were killed by 10 April. Just four days later, on 14 April, another doctor said 700 rebels and civilians died in the two-month siege. There was no explanation for the discrepancy in the numbers. The numbers of civilians killed in comparison to the numbers of rebels killed have also varied, with one doctor in the city claiming that 80 percent of those killed were civilians, while a member of Misrata's medical committee stated that up until 21 April 365 people were killed, of which at least 85 were civilians. Based on various reports during the battle, roughly three-quarters (of the lower number) to a fifth (of the higher number) of those killed were rebels, while the rest were civilians. Loyalist forces had also suffered at least 358 dead, a number based on rebel reports. The numbers of wounded had also not been consistent, with Fortia reporting 949 wounded rebels and civilians (only 22 of them being women and eight children) by 10 April, while earlier reports had put the number at around 1,400. By 21 April, the city's medical committee stated that 4,000 people had been wounded.

On 9 September, the NTC health minister said that at least 2,000 rebels and civilians had been killed in the Misrata area since the war began, with at least 900 injuries that had resulted in loss of limbs.

=== Evacuation of the wounded and stranded ===
After the NATO-enforced no-fly zone was established, an international effort was underway to evacuate 14,000 stranded migrants and hundreds of rebels and civilians wounded in the fighting.

On 18 March, a Moroccan ferry unloaded 1,800 migrants in Tanger, most of them Moroccans, after it evacuated them from Misrata the previous week.

On 2 April, a Turkish ship had evacuated 250 wounded from the city. The next day, a Tunisian ship took another 71 wounded.

On 9 April, two Qatari ships evacuated 1,800 Egyptians from the city and on 11 April, a Turkish ship evacuated another 1,000.

On 14 April, a Qatari ship and a ship sent by Doctors Without Borders were scheduled to dock in the port. The Qatari vessel was to take on at least 800 of the migrants while the other ship was to evacuate 165 of the wounded. However, the ships couldn't dock because of heavy rocket shelling of the port and extensive damage to the harbor. Still, in the evening, a Greek ferry did dock with the purpose of transferring the foreigners to Benghazi from where they would move on to Egypt. The next day, after unloading 400 tonnes of aid supplies, the ship left with 1,182 migrants on board, mostly Bangladeshis and Egyptians. Later, the Doctors Without Borders ship had also managed to dock and evacuated 99 people, 64 of them wounded, to Tunisia.

On 18 April, a ship evacuated 971 people, most of them migrants, including 650 Ghanaians and people of other nationalities like Filipinos and Ukrainians, but also 100 Libyans, including 23 wounded. Later during the day, a ship of the International Committee of the Red Cross picked up another 618 migrants.

On 20 April, two Qatari chartered ships evacuated almost 2,500 people. They arrived the next day in Benghazi, with one of them carrying 1,500 people, including 150 wounded, while the other ship carried 950 people. Later during the day, the Greek ferry the Ionian Spirit also arrived in Benghazi with 1,000 people, including 239 Libyan civilians, and the rest migrants, mostly from Niger. Among those 1,000 were also 31 wounded, including four amputees.

On 24 April, an aid ship evacuated 1,000 people, including migrants and some wounded people. A Qatari ship had also taken 90 wounded to Tunisia.

On 25 April, nearly 1,000 migrants, most of them Nigerians, and 17 wounded people were evacuated.

On 27 April, an ICRC and an IOM ship transported more people from the city. The ICRC ship evacuated more than 600 civilians while the IOM ferry took 1,091 people, including more than 800 migrants (most of them from Niger) and 30–55 wounded, from Misrata.

On 4 May, the IOM ship docked in the port, despite a floating sea mine and heavy artillery shelling, and took on 800–1,138 people, again mostly migrants (the last of them), among whom were at least 36 critically wounded people.

On 12 May, a ship with 108 refugees from Misrata, including 25 wounded, arrived in Benghazi.
