= Dafniya =

Ad Dafniya الدافنية
- Village
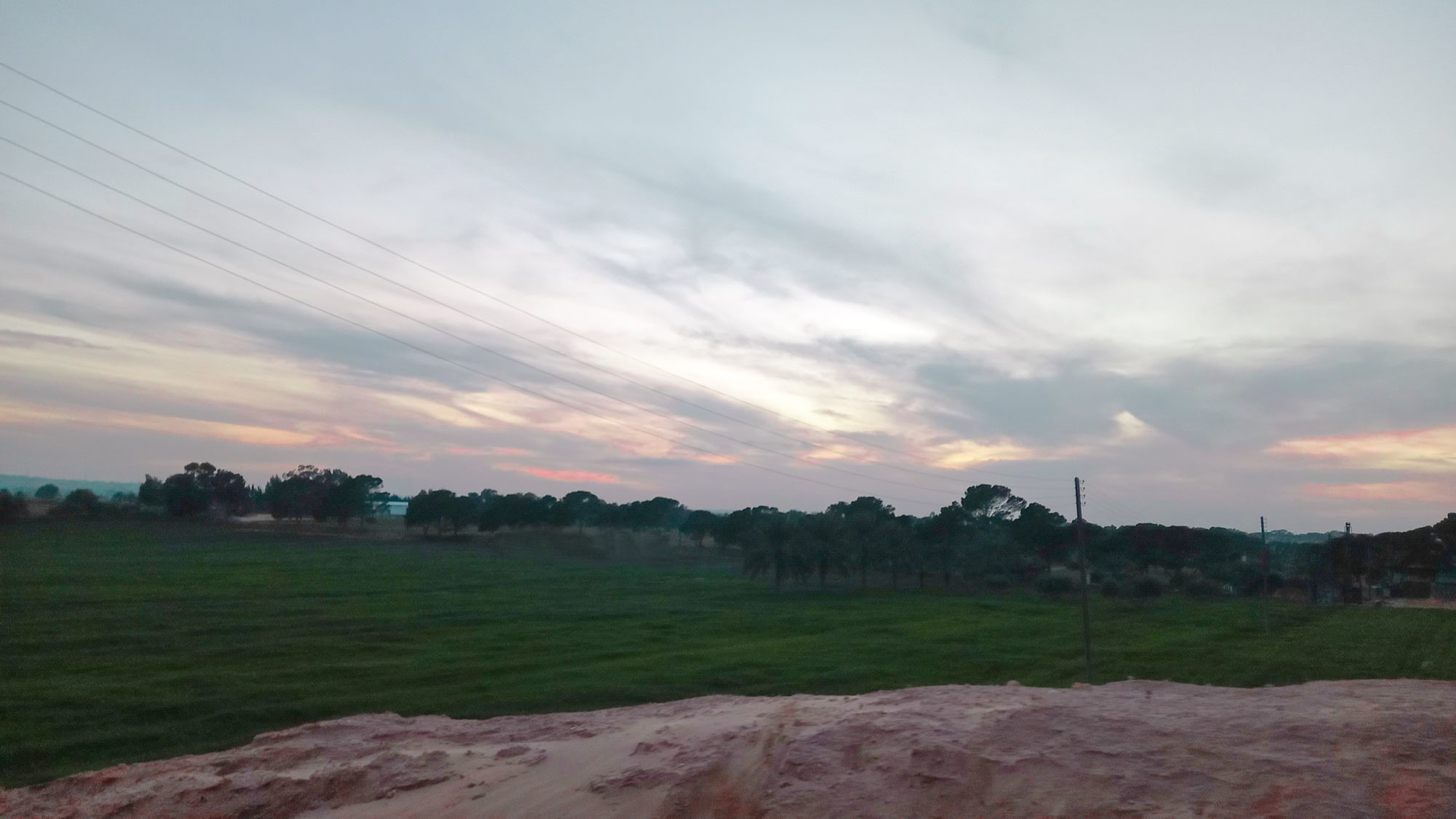

- Location in Libya
- Coordinates: 32°24′22″N 14°50′13″E
- Country: Libya
- Region: Tripolitania
- District: Misrata
- Time zone: UTC+2 (EET)

Dafniya (Dafiniya, Al Davniya, Ad Dafinīyah, Arabic: الدافنية) is a Mediterranean coastal town in Libya, halfway between Misrata and Zliten. During the Libyan Civil War the town of Dafniya saw heavy fighting.
