= National Liberation Army (Libya) =

Libyan military organisation

- جيش التحرير الوطني
- Other name: Free Libyan Army
- Commander-in-Chief: Abdul Fatah Younis (appointed) †; Khalifa Haftar (self-proclaimed)
- Defence Minister: Omar al-Hariri (March–May 2011); Jalal al-Digheily (May–October 2011)
- Dates active: March–October 2011
- Allegiance: (Libya) National Transitional Council
- Headquarters: Ajdabiya, Libya
- Active regions: Libya
- Ideology: Anti-Gaddafism; Democracy; Pluralism; Secularism (allegedly); Islamism (factions)
- Size: 3,000 (initially); 17,000 (peak)

The National Liberation Army (Arabic: جيش التحرير الوطني الليبي, romanized: jaysh al-taḥrīr al-waṭanī al-lībī), officially the National Liberation Armed Forces of the Free Libyan Republic, formerly known as the Free Libyan Army, was a Libyan military organisation affiliated with the National Transitional Council, which was constituted during the First Libyan Civil War by defected military members and civilian volunteers, in order to engage in battle against both remaining members of the Libyan Armed Forces and paramilitia loyal to the rule of Muammar Gaddafi. Its self-proclaimed chief commander was General Khalifa Haftar, although the National Transitional Council preferred to appoint Major General Abdul Fatah Younes Al-Obeidi as its commander-in-chief. It had prepared for some time in portions of Eastern Libya controlled by the anti-Gaddafi forces for eventual full-on combat in Western Libya against pro-Gaddafi militants, training many men before beginning to go on the offensive. They have battled for control of Benghazi, Misrata, Brega, Ajdabiya, Zawiya and Ra's Lanuf as well as several towns in the Nafusa Mountains. They finally began the Battle for Tripoli in August 2011 when they attacked from the west of the city, as well as fomenting an internal uprising on 20 August.

There were claims that there were 8,000 soldiers in Benghazi equipped with a substantial number of weapons captured from abandoned Libyan army depots, including AK-47 and FN FAL rifles, RPGs, SPGs, anti-aircraft guns and several tanks. The National Liberation Army had at least 3,000 soldiers after initial defections from the Libyan Armed Forces, and later more than 17,000 at its peak.

The force was formerly named the Free Libyan Army, but it was changed at the end of May 2011 to "help better define the increasingly professional and disciplined military efforts to overcome the Gaddafi regime", according to a statement released by the National Transitional Council. It uses the tricolour flag first adopted by Libya in 1951, which has become emblematic of the Libyan Republic and the revolt against Gaddafi; considering that the flag is the same sign of Libya's independence and freedom from the Italian occupation.

The NLA finally succeeded in defeating the last pro-Gaddafi remnants on 20 October 2011, during heavy fighting in Sirte, and captured Muammar Gaddafi himself, who later died of bullet wounds after his capture, effectively ending the Libyan civil war. The current status of the organisation following the Libyan provisional government's "declaration of liberation" was its reorganization into the Libyan National Army.

== 2011 transitional period and restructuring ==
As of November 2011, the National Transitional Council is in the process of restructuring the army, with military personnel who defected from the Gaddafi regime and former rebel fighters of the National Liberation Army forming the basis is the new Libyan National Army. Major General Khalifa Haftar was chosen as the overall commander of the new Libyan Army due to his military experience and loyalty to the revolution that overthrew Gaddafi.

The Libyan Army only numbered "a few thousand" trained soldiers in November 2011, and was rapidly trying to train up new fighters who could keep the peace nationwide and deter rogue militias from acting without NTC orders, and was responsible for brokering a ceasefire on at least one occasion in November between warring militias from Zawiya and Al Maya. On 1 December 2011, it was reported that the National Liberation Army was to integrate up to 50,000 former rebel fighters into the new Libyan national army and police forces, with the aid of French training, with long-term aims to integrate as many as 200,000 fighters from the brigades that had fought against Gaddafi during the civil war.

In December 2011, Turkey agreed to provide training to the Libyan Army as it attempted to reorganize in the aftermath of the civil war.

Also in December, large numbers of former rebels were being given jobs in the new army, whilst the government also announced that they would be free to join the special forces and the navy too. According to Osama al-Juwali, the defense minister, "the idea [was] to inject new blood in the army which was marginalized by the tyrant (Gaddafi)".

General Yousef Mangoush said on 5 January 2012 that Libya's new army faces major obstacles such as rebuilding bases destroyed during the conflict, as well as disarming militas that were not part of the new army. National Army commander General Khalifa Hifter said later that it could take between three and five years for Libya to field a capable enough army to protect its borders.

== Brigades ==
No reliable estimate on the total strength of the Army exists. Training camps are being organized in Benghazi, Bayda and Ajdabiya attended by "thousands of men" according to a report of 3 to 6 March. The opposition force taking Brega and Ra's Lanuf during an advance of 2–4 March was estimated as numbering between 500 and 1,000 men. In the Nafusa Mountains alone there are up to 2,000 rebel fighters.

After being driven back to the outskirts of Benghazi, the Free Libyan Army took the offensive once more on 25 March. In a string of victories the rebels retook the cities of Ajdabiya, Brega, Ra's Lanuf and Bin Jawad and were advancing to Sirte. However, after being in position for 48 hours, they were forced to withdraw from Bin Jawad and Ra's Lanuf again. The front line was than in the region of Brega and Ajdabiya for several months, with additional front lines in Misrata and the Nafusa Mountains. In late August Rebels in the east were finally able to retake Brega and several other cities closing in on Sirte. At the same time rebels in Misrata were able to push out of the city and secured all surrounding towns, and rebels in the Nafusa Mountains were able to take most of the western coastline including Tripoli itself. Each soldier has also been given an ID card with photo, name, brigade-name, and their blood type. These ID cards are either in the form of paper in plastic slips or plastic cards.

Some of the Brigades reported on by International journalists are as follows:

- Obaida Ibn Jarrah Brigade – Islamic extremist militia allegedly implicated in the assassination of National Liberation Army commander-in-chief Abdul Fatah Younis on 28 July 2011.
- Okbah Ibn Nafih Brigade – Islamic extremist militia implicated in the detention of National Liberation Army commander-in-chief Abdul Fatah Younis in Brega's front on late July.
- Omar Mukhtar Brigade – Based in Ajdabiya and numbering 200 men and 10 trucks.
- Ali Hassan al-Jaber Brigade – Originally in Bayda, saw action during the Battle of Sirte (2011).
- Jabal Martyrs Brigade – Based in Bayda and numbering 125 men.
- Tripoli Martyrs Brigade – Based in Bayda.
- Battalion Libya Free – Based in Bayda.
- Bayda Martyrs Brigade – Based in Bayda.
- Martyrs of Abu Salim – Based in Bayda.
- Zawiya Martyrs Brigade – Based in the Nafusa Mountains, trained to take Zawiya
- Shaheed Brigade – Based in and around Misrata, considered an elite unit in the rebel army
- Misrata Brigade – Based originally in Misrata, reported as based in Tripoli as of August 2011.
- Black Brigade – Based in and around Misrata
- Swehdi Brigade – Based in and around Misrata
- Al Horia Brigade – Based in and around Misrata, garrisoning Tawergha
- Faisal Brigade – Based on the outskirts of Zliten
- Arise Brigade – Based on the Libyan Coastal Highway between Misrata and Tripoli.
- Tripoli Brigade – originally based in Nalut in the Nafusa Mountains and numbering 1,300 men. It is the elite of the rebel forces and was trained to take Tripoli, where it is currently based.
- Abu Salim Brigade – Eastern Libya
- Sabratha Brigade – Nafusa Mountains, trained to take Sabratha
- Zuwara Brigade – Nafusa Mountains, trained to take Zuwara
- Martyr Wasam Qaliyah brigade – Western Libya composing up to 300 fighters
- Coastal Brigade – Based on the Libyan Coastal Highway between Zawiya and Tripoli
- Nalut Brigade – Based in Nalut, Nafusa Mountains
- Kabaw Brigade – Based in the Nafusa Mountains, and took Tiji and Badr
- Jadu Brigade – Based in Jadu and numbering 300 men
- 28 May Brigade – Based around Tripoli, composing of Warfalla Tribe Members and trained to take Bani Walid
- Victory Unit – Based on the road between Misrata and Bani Walid
- Desert Shield Brigade – Liberated Sabha
- Zintan Brigade – Fought for Sirte and during 2011 Nafusa Mountains Campaign.
- Fursan Brigade – Based in Tripoli
- Gharyan Brigade – Based in Gharyan
- Kekka Brigade – Based in Tripoli and numbering 800 fighters.
- Lions of the Valley Brigade – Based in Misrata, fought in Sirte.
- 11th Brigade – Based in and fought in Sirte.
- Al-Ghiran Brigade – Based in Sirte and Misrata and was responsible for the capture of Muammar Gaddafi.
- Khaled bin al-Waleed Brigade - Based in Zintan and was responsible for the capture of Saif al-Islam Gaddafi
- Sabha Martyrs of Libya Brigade - Based near Sabha and claimed to be responsible for the capture of Abdullah Senussi.

== Suppliers ==
- – Egypt has been reported to be supplying the rebels with mostly small arms such as assault rifles and ammunition.
- – France has acknowledged having sent arms to rebels in the Nafusa Mountains. These are rocket launcher, MILAN anti-tank missiles and guns and ammunition that have been sent.
- (Poland) – The Polish Press Agency reported that unofficially the Polish government supplied the rebels with anti-tank rocket launchers and military vehicles and officers of Polish Special Forces in direct operations.
- – Qatar has been reported to be supplying the rebels with various kinds of weapons including MILAN anti-tank systems and AK-47 rifles (as many as 400 such rifles have been estimated to have reached the rebels). Qatar has also supplied the rebels with camouflage and armored vests.
- – Sudan supplied fighters in the Nafusa Mountains, Misrata, Kufra, and Benghazi with supplies, ammunition, and weapons such as FN-FAL and AK-47 assault rifles.
- – The United Arab Emirates had been reported to be supplying the rebels with Belgian FN-FAL rifles and telecommunication network.
- – The United Kingdom supplied the rebel force with communication equipment and body armor in order to get the force more organised and define a central command structure.
- – The United States is moving to provide Libyan rebels with $25 million in medical supplies, radios and other aid that would not include weapons as stated by the Secretary of State Hillary Clinton.

== Equipment ==
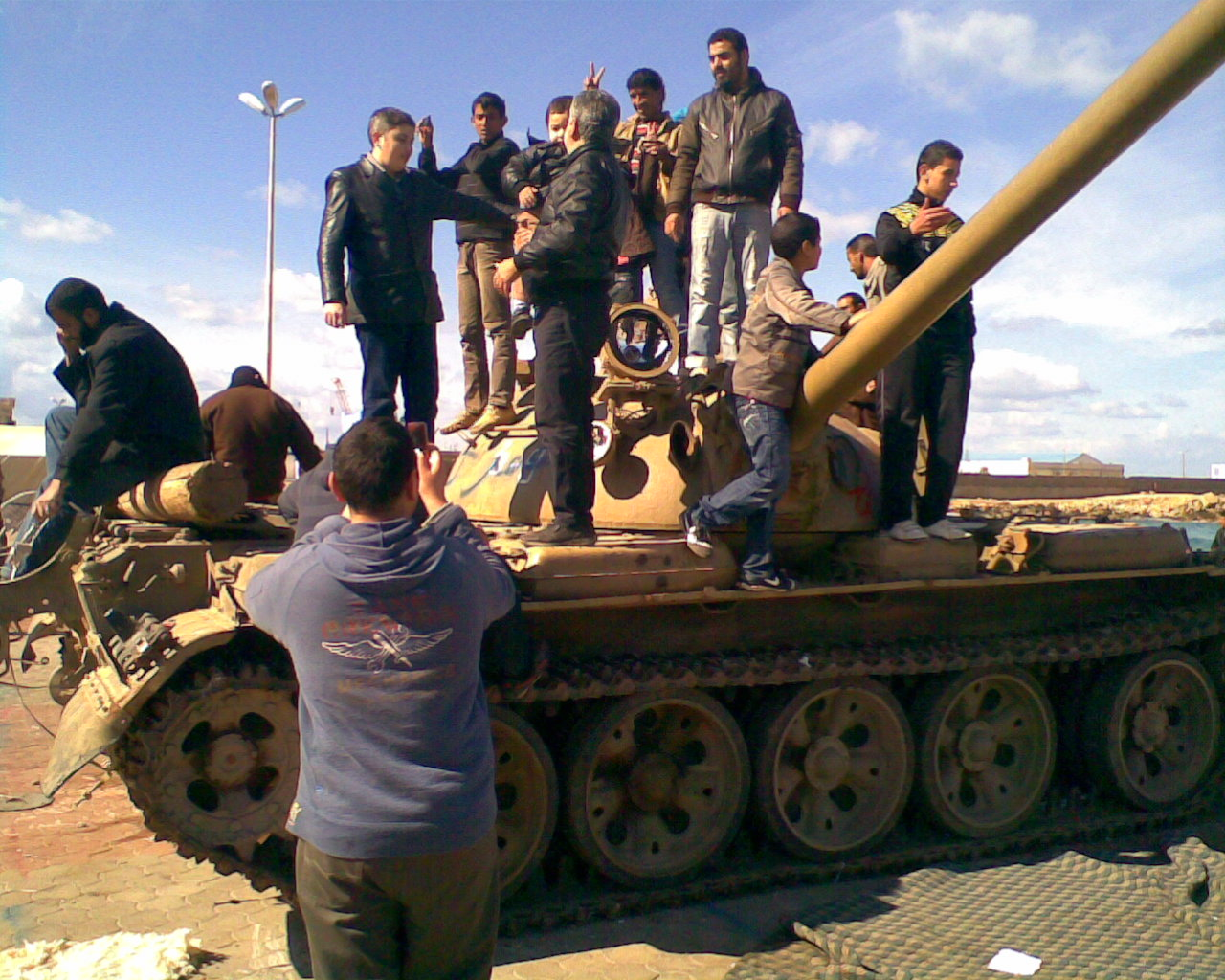
Tank captured from Gaddafi loyalists in Benghazi

The equipment of the National Liberation Army came primarily from abandoned Army depots, Libyan military defectors (notably in eastern Libya, Benghazi, Bayda, and Ajdabiya), Egyptian Armed Forces, France, Qatar and the United States. It is not exactly known what equipment was in use at the end of the war but reports from journalists reveal the following were in use (limited in some cases as in tank and armor because of unavailability of spare parts).

=== Camouflage ===
Camouflage clothing was provided by Qatar. Rebels were also seen in Ajdabiya wearing the military fatigues.

=== Pistols ===
- (Serbia) CZ99
- (Austria) Glock 17
- (United States) Browning Hi-Power
- (Italy) Beretta Model 70
- (Belgium) FN Five-seven
- (United Arab Emirates) Caracal F

=== Shotguns ===
- (Italy) Benelli Vinci semi-automatic shotgun
- Over and under shotgun
- Side-by-side shotgun
- (Italy) Benelli M4

=== Submachine guns ===
- (Nazi Germany) MP 38
- (United Kingdom) Sterling Submachine Gun
- (France) MAT-49
- (Italy) Beretta M12
- (West Germany) MP5SD2
- (Belgium) FN P90 PDW

=== Carbines and rifles ===
- (Serbia) Zastava M93 Black Arrow anti-materiel rifle
- (Serbia) Zastava M21 17.000 assault rifle
- (Kingdom of Italy) Carcano bolt-action rifle
- (Germany) Heckler & Koch G36 assault rifle
- (United Kingdom) Lee–Enfield bolt-action rifle
- (Nazi Germany) Kar 98k bolt-action rifle
- (Soviet Union) AK-47 assault rifle (Other variants including AKM, Zastava M70, AK-63, AK-74, AK-103, Chinese Type 56, Romanian AIM and East German MPi assault rifles)
- (Soviet Union) AKS-74U assault carbine
- (Belgium) FN FAL battle rifle
- (India) 1B1 INSAS
- (United States) M4 carbine
- (China) Norinco CQ assault rifle (a copy of the Colt M16 rifle)
- (Belgium) FN FAL squad automatic weapon

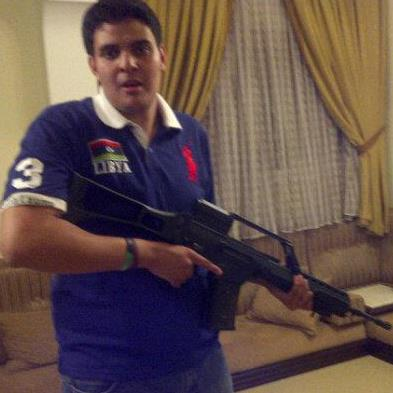
Misrata militiaman with Heckler & Koch G36 rifle

- (Belgium) FN F2000 assault rifle
- (India) INSAS LMG
- (United States) M16 rifle assault rifle
- (Germany) / (Turkey) HK G3 battle rifle (20,000 requested)

=== Machine guns and autocannons ===
- (Serbia) Zastava M02 Coyote Heavy machine gun
- (Serbia) M84 Light machine gun
- (Soviet Union) DP-28 Light machine gun
- (Soviet Union) RPK Light machine gun
- (Singapore) Ultimax 100 Light machine gun
- (South Korea) Daewoo Precision Industries K3 Light machine gun
- (Soviet Union) PKM General-purpose machine gun
- (Soviet Union) PKT re-purposed as portable machine guns
- (West Germany) Rheinmetall MG 3 General-purpose machine gun
- (Belgium) FN MAG General-purpose machine gun
- (United States) M1919A4 and M1919A6 Browning
- (United States) M2 and M3 .50 cal Heavy machine gun (Mainly mounted on Technicals)
- (Soviet Union) DShK 12.7mm Heavy machine gun (Mainly mounted on Technicals)
- (Soviet Union) NSV 12.7mm Heavy machine gun taken off of T-72 tanks (Mainly mounted on Technicals)
- (Soviet Union) KPV 14.5mm Heavy machine gun mounted on Technicals
- (Soviet Union) ZPU (ZPU-1, ZPU-2, ZPU-4) 14.5mm Anti-aircraft guns (Mainly mounted on Technicals but also on wheeled carriages)
- (Francoist Spain) Hispano-Suiza HS.820 20 mm naval anti-aircraft autocannon mounted on Technicals
- (Soviet Union) ZU-23-2 23 mm anti-aircraft autocannons mounted on Technicals
- (Soviet Union) Gryazev-Shipunov GSh-23L 23 mm twin-barreled autocannon taken off of pro-Gaddafi force planes and mounted on Technicals
- (Soviet Union) Gryazev-Shipunov GSh-30-1 30x165mm autocannon taken off of pro-Gaddafi force planes
- (Romania) Romanian M-1980/1988 30mm autocannon mounted on Technicals
- (Soviet Union) AZP S-60 57 mm autocannon

=== Sniper rifles ===
- (Russia) OSV-96 Imported
- (Soviet Union) Dragunov SVD
- (Romania) PSL (rifle)
- (South Africa) Truvelo 14.5x114mm and 20mm sniper rifles captured from the pro-Gaddafi forces

=== Rocket propelled, missiles and grenade systems ===
- (Serbia) M79 Osa shoulder-launched, anti-tank rocket-propelled grenade
- (Soviet Union) RPG-7 shoulder-launched, anti-tank rocket-propelled grenade launcher
- (Soviet Union) RPG-26
- (Socialist Federal Republic of Yugoslavia) RB M57 Yugoslavian shoulder-launched, anti-tank rocket-propelled grenade launcher
- (Soviet Union) SA-7 9K32 "Strela-2" MANPADS
- (Soviet Union) 9K11 Malyutka (Sagger) anti-tank missiles
- (France) MILAN anti-tank missiles
- (Russia) 9M123 Khrizantema supersonic anti-tank missiles
- (Sweden) Carl Gustav recoilless rifle
- (Soviet Union) SPG-9
- (Soviet Union) B-10 recoilless rifle
- (United States) M40 recoilless rifle mounted on jeeps and pickups with roof and windshield cut off
- (China) Type 63 multiple rocket launcher (Mainly mounted on Technicals)
- (Soviet Union) 122 mm multiple rocket launcher salvaged from damaged BM-21 Grad then divided into 3 to 8 tubes and mounted on Technicals
- (Soviet Union) S-5 rocket UB-16-57UMP, UB-32 rocket launchers
- (Soviet Union) Katyusha rocket launcher mounted on Technicals
- (Soviet Union) AGS-17 automatic grenade launcher
- (Soviet Union) F1 hand grenade
- (Soviet Union) RGD-5
- (United States) AN M18 Smoke grenade
- (United States) M2 mortar
- (Soviet Union) M1938 mortar
- (Soviet Union) 122 mm howitzer 2A18 (D-30)
- (Soviet Union) 130 mm towed field gun M1954 (M-46)
- (United States) 155 mm towed field gun M114 howitzer

=== Vehicles ===
- (Soviet Union) T-34 - At least one seized during the war and placed at the main square in Garyan, according to Reuters. Current status unknown.
- (Soviet Union) T-55 main battle tank
- (Soviet Union) T-62 main battle tank
- (Soviet Union) T-72 main battle tank
- (China) Type 59 main battle tank
- (United Kingdom) Centurion AVRE 105 mm main battle tank, supplied by Jordan
- (Soviet Union) 2S1 Gvozdika 122 mm self-propelled artillery
- (Italy) Palmaria 155 mm self-propelled artillery
- (Soviet Union) BMP-1 Infantry fighting vehicle
- (Soviet Union) BMP-2 Infantry fighting vehicle
- (Soviet Union) BMP-3 Infantry fighting vehicle - 10 delivered from pre-revolution order.
- (Soviet Union) 9P157-2 "Khrizantema-S" BMP-3 Anti-tank version with supersonic 9M123 Khrizantema (AT-15) system with radar and laser guidance - 14 in service; 4 pre-revolution, 10 delivered in October 2013.
- (Soviet Union) MT-LBu Armored personnel carrier
- (Soviet Union) BTR-60 Armored personnel carrier converted to MRLS for Type 63 multiple rocket launcher
- (United States) M113 Armored personnel carrier with ZU-23-2 23mm anti-aircraft autocannons mounted on top
- (United States) M577 command vehicle converted to Infantry fighting vehicle with 2A28 Grom turret from BMP-1 mounted on top
- (South Africa) Ratel 20 Infantry fighting vehicles with improvised ZPU-1 Anti-aircraft gun mounted on top, supplied by Qatar
- (Brazil) EE-9 Cascavel Armored car - Captured or salvaged by the Zawiya Martyrs Brigade in Sirte
- (United Arab Emirates) Nimr Armored car
- (United States) Humvee - 200 donated by the U.S. Army in July 2013.
- (Soviet Union) SA-6 Gainful
- (Soviet Union) SA-8 Gecko
- (Czechoslovakia) RM-70 multiple rocket launcher
- (Soviet Union) BM-21 Grad Multiple rocket launcher trucks
- (Soviet Union) AT-T
- (Soviet Union) S-125 Neva/Pechora
- Technicals (Armed with DShK, M2, M3, NSV, KPV, ZPU, ZU-23-2, GSh-23L, HS.820, 2A28 Grom with or without the turret taken off the BMP-1)

==== Aircraft ====
- (Soviet Union) MiG-21 Fighter jet aircraft – One MiG-21UM crashed after take-off from Benina airport due to technical malfunction.
- (Soviet Union) MiG-23 Fighter jet aircraft – one shot down by friendly fire over Benghazi.
- (Socialist Federal Republic of Yugoslavia) Soko G-2 Ground-attack and reconnaissance
- (Soviet Union) Mil Mi-2 light armoured utility helicopter
- (Soviet Union) Mil Mi-14 Anti Submarine Helicopter
- (Soviet Union) Mil Mi-24 Attack helicopter/Transport helicopter

Note: Both the Soko G-2, and Mil Mi-2 were captured at Misrata Airport on 24 February 2011.

==== Unmanned aerial vehicles (UAVs) ====
- (Canada) 1 Aeryon Scout Micro UAV

==== Ships ====
- (Soviet Union) 1 Koni class frigate
  - 212 Al-Hani
- (Soviet Union) 1 Nanuchka class corvette
  - 416 Tariq Ibn Ziyaad
- (Soviet Union) 2 Natya class minesweeper

== See also ==
- Green Resistance
- Alliance of Yemeni Tribes
- Free Syrian Army
- Armed Forces of the Libyan Arab Jamahiriya
