= Zliten =

Zliten زليتن
- Town
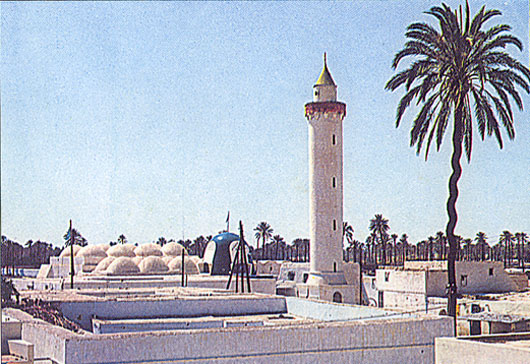

- Seal

- Location in Libya
- Coordinates: 32°27′50″N 14°34′21″E
- Country: Libya
- Region: Tripolitania
- District: Murqub

Government
  - Mayor: Moftah Al-Taher Hammadi

Population (2025)
  - Total: 203,790
- Time zone: UTC+2 (EET)
  - Summer (DST): UTCLibya
- License Plate Code: 36
- Website: zliten.gov.ly

Zliten (Arabic: زليتن, romanized: Zlīten) It is a city in the Murqub District of Libya, with a predominantly Arab population of around 65,203 as of 2025. The city lies approximately 175 km east of Tripoli.

== Geography ==
The name Zliten is given to both the city and the whole area. As a city, Zliten is situated 175 km (109 mi) east of the capital, Tripoli, and about 35 km (22 mi) east of the ancient Roman city of Leptis Magna. It is about 60 km (37 mi) west of the city of Misrata and 40 km (25 mi) east of Khoms. It is spread over an area of about 8 km^{2} (3.1 sq mi). The former district of Zliten is widespread and covers an area of 3,000 km^{2} (1,200 sq mi). It is surrounded by the Mediterranean in the north, Misrata in the east, Bani Walid in the south and Khoms in the west.

=== Climate ===
Climate data for Zliten
Month	Jan	Feb	Mar	Apr	May	Jun	Jul	Aug	Sep	Oct	Nov	Dec	Year
Mean daily maximum °C (°F)	17.6 (63.7)	19.7 (67.5)	22.1 (71.8)	25.4 (77.7)	27.3 (81.1)	31.5 (88.7)	33.0 (91.4)	33.6 (92.5)	30.6 (87.1)	29.3 (84.7)	24.1 (75.4)	19.7 (67.5)	26.2 (79.1)
Mean daily minimum °C (°F)	7.6 (45.7)	8.8 (47.8)	10.4 (50.7)	13.6 (56.5)	16.0 (60.8)	19.5 (67.1)	21.3 (70.3)	22.3 (72.1)	19.6 (67.3)	18.1 (64.6)	13.8 (56.8)	9.8 (49.6)	15.1 (59.1)
Average precipitation mm (inches)	50 (2.0)	27 (1.1)	17 (0.7)	8 (0.3)	4 (0.2)	1 (0.0)	0 (0)	0 (0)	9 (0.4)	34 (1.3)	31 (1.2)	52 (2.0)	233 (9.2)
Source: Climate-data.org

== Name ==
The name is derived from the name of the Isliten tribe, an old branch of the Nafzawa Berbers. Members of this tribe used to live in Libya and Tunisia, but are also known to have lived as far west as Morocco. They are mentioned by Leo Africanus in the 16th century as living in western Libya.

== Education ==
Zliten is home to one of Libya's most renowned Islamic universities, Al-Jamiaa Al-Asmariya Al-Islamiya (Arabic: الجامعة الأسمرية الإسلامية i.e. Al-Asmariya Islamic University). It includes a number of faculties; Faculty of Arts, Faculty of Sciences, Faculty of Economics and Political Sciences, Faculty of Dentistry and Mouth Surgery, and Faculty of Education. There is also a higher vocational training center covering various engineering fields.

== Economy ==
Zliten has several modern banking institutions, a major shopping center and the Zliten Hotel, the city's top accommodation for tourists. In 2001, the Libyan Government proposed a number of state company projects for which joint ventures would be considered. These included an expansion of Arab Cement Company’s (ACC) cement plant in Zliten valued at $169 million. In February 2005, the initial public offering of shares in the formerly state-owned ACC resulted in the sale of 60% of the company. ACC proposed to build a second 1-Mt/yr-capacity cement production line at its Zliten plant. Arab Union Contracting Co. (AUCC) commissioned a 1.2-Mt/yr-capacity cement clinker plant near Zliten in December 2004; commercial production began in September 2005. AUCC began a feasibility study for the construction of a second clinker production line at its production facility. In 2004, construction began on extending a seawater desalination plant in Zliten with a total capacity of 10,000 cubic metres (8.1 acre⋅ft) per day using the multi-stage flash distillation process.

== History and culture ==
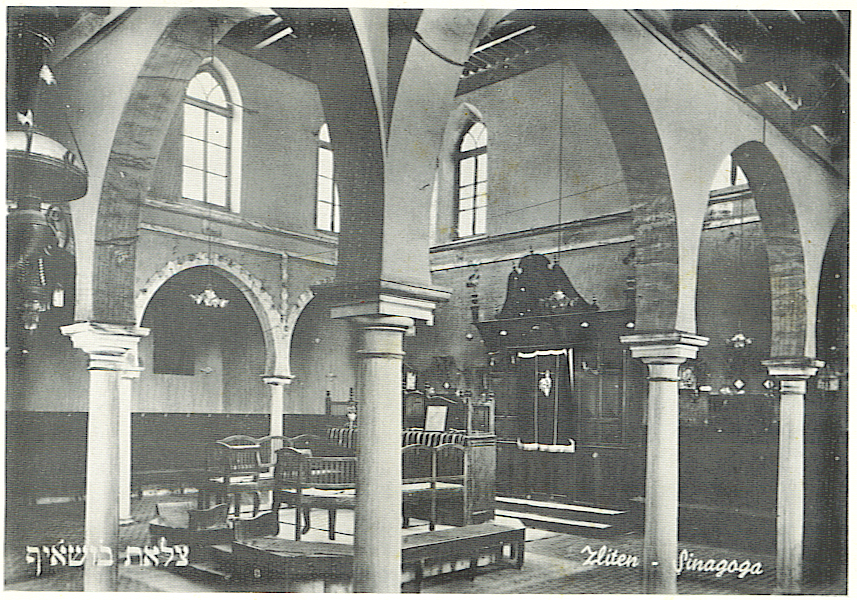
The Slat Abn Shaif Synagogue, Zliten, before WWII

There are many ancient Roman sites in Zliten, such as the coastal Villa of Omira ('Darbuk Omira' ) where several impressive mosaics were discovered, and the Castle in Al-Jumaa. The town also contains the Mausoleum and Mosque of Abd As-Salam Al-Asmar, Mosque of Abu-Minjal, Mosque of Albaza and many other mosques. There is some fine Arabic calligraphy in sandstone on top of the outer pillars of the building saying al-mulk-'illah ("Everything to Allah"). The town is famous for its olives, palm trees and citrus fruits along beautiful coastal shores. The Slat Abn Shaif Synagogue (Hebrew: בית הכנסת צלאת בן שאיף) in Zliten was a historic synagogue and Lag Ba'omer pilgrimage site for Libyan Jews. It was over 900 years old and was destroyed in the 1980s by Gaddafi and replaced by apartments.

On Friday, 24 August 2012 the shrine of Sidi Abdul-Salam Al-Asmar Al-Fituri suffered extensive damage at the hands of violent Salafists. Muhammad al-Madkhali, a cleric of the Madkhalism movement, praised his loyalists who'd carried out the act and encouraged other Salafists to engage in similar attacks. This action was condemned by the Grand Mufti of Libya, Abdelrahman al-Gharyani, and 22 organisations in Libya, including Lawyers for Justice in Libya (LFJL) and Arabic Network for Human Rights Information (ANHRI), as well as the UNESCO Director-General, Irina Bokova.

Recent work on the region (dating between 2003 and 2017) using Google Earth imagery has identified 278 certain or potential archaeological sites within Zliten. The majority of these sites were determined as structures or enclosures, and their purpose, for most, interpreted as related to agricultural activities which the primary land use today. These 278 sites recorded in the EAMENA(Endangered Archaeology in the Middle East and North Africa) database of the Zliten area. In this database, 170 sites were marked as in good condition, 50 in fair condition, 24 sites in poor condition, 15 in very bad and 16 recorded as completely destroyed, (with 3 in unknown conditions). Although this work was undertaken as recently as 2017, the developments in Libya, the political and economic situation affect both the management and very survival of Libya's ancient sites. Archaeological sites, as in Iraq, Syria and Afghanistan do not comply to militant revolutionaries' aims, they are thus expendable and can/or in some cases 'must' be destroyed (https://www.nature.com/news/cultural-heritage-save-libyan-archaeology-1.16781). The EAMENA aim to track these sites and their condition while the (Society of Libyan Studies) publish reports aiming to promote Libyan archaeology, history and environment.

=== Rubb ===
Zliten has a proliferation of date palms that yield what is considered by many to be the best rubb (date juice) in Libya. Tarbuni is often served with the most famous local dish asida, made from flour, boiled with salt, and eaten with olive and date juice. Asida is usually served as a quick meal for cold nights in winter. It is usually reserved to commemorate important religious occasions such as the birth of the Islamic prophet Muhammad. Asida is also the celebratory dish of choice for Tripolitanian families when a child is born.

== Zliten during the First Libyan Civil War (2011) ==
During the First Libyan Civil War, Zliten was contested between forces loyal to Gaddafi, and opposition fighters who were trying to seize the strategically located city to allow them to advance to the capital, Tripoli. In mid-June 2011, the Zliten uprising by rebel fighters against the military garrison in the city was crushed. The town was on the front line by July as rebels from Misrata continued their attempts to take control of the town from the loyalists based there, during the Battle of the Misrata frontline. In mid-July 2011, Zliten was the site of a massive pro-Gaddafi rally when thousands of Gaddafi supporters gathered on the main square in the city to show their support to the Libyan leader.

On 5 August, the Libyan government claimed that NATO airstrikes killed 85 people, including 33 children, 32 women and 20 men, attacking a children's hospital near Zliten. Reporters were shown 30 bodies in a local morgue, including two children. Officials claimed that the rest of the bodies were taken to other hospitals, but this could not be independently confirmed.

On 19 August 2011, the rebels made a major push and drove loyalist forces out of the city.

== Zliten during the Second Libyan Civil War (2014-2020) ==
On January 7, 2016, during the Second Civil War, a truck bomb killed more than 60 police officers and wounded over 200 at a police training camp in the town. Wilayat al-Barqa, an affiliate of the Islamic State of Iraq and the Levant in Libya claimed responsibility for the attack.

== See also ==
- List of cities in Libya
