= Misrata Military Council =

Misrata Military Council Misrata Revolutionary Brigades
- كتائب مصراتة المجلس العسكري واتحاد الثوار مصراتة
- Active: February 2011-present
- Country: Libya
- Allegiance: (Libya) Government of National Unity
- Size: 40,000+ fighters, 200+ Battalions
- Garrison/HQ: Misrata, Libya
- Mottos: "مصراتة الصمود" "ليبيا حرة وستبقى حرة"
- Anniversaries: February 17th
- Engagements: Factional violence in Libya: 2012 Bani Walid uprising; Siege of Bani Walid (2012); Second Libyan Civil War: Western Libya campaign; Battle of Sirte (2016); Libyan civil war (2011): Battle of Misrata (2011); Battle of the Misrata frontline; Battle of Tripoli (2011); Battle of Sirte (2016)

Commanders
- Founder: Ibrahim Ben Rajib
- Brigadier General: Mohammed al-Gasri
- Mayor: Mohammed Eshtaiwi
- Spokesperson: Fathi Bashagha

The Misrata Military Council, also commonly referred to as the Misrata Brigades, or the Misrata Revolutionary Brigades, are armed units linked to the town of Misrata and its surrounding area, allied to, but separate from, the Libyan Army. They are the largest and strongest military unit in all of Libya, consisting of 40,000 fighters with over 200 battalions, making them the largest block of fighters. The Misrata Brigades played a large part in the Libyan Revolution, which overthrew Gaddafi, as well as the Second Libyan Civil War in which they fought the Libyan National Army as well as ISIL in Sirte.

== Background ==
The Misrata brigades, also known as the Misrata Military Council, originated during the Libyan civil war in 2011. Misrata, the third-largest city in Libya, played a critical role in the uprising against the Gaddafi regime. Gaddafi had launched a brutal 3-month siege on Misrata, with reports emerging of indiscriminate bombing of civilian infrastructure, extrajudicial killings, and the targeting of medical institutions and vehicles. As the conflict escalated, local residents, activists, and defected military personnel in Misrata formed armed groups to defend their city against government forces. The Misrata brigades emerged as a collective of these armed factions, sharing a common goal of ousting the Gaddafi regime and supporting the broader revolutionary movement.

== First Libyan civil war ==
=== Battle of Misrata ===
The Misrata Brigade played a pivotal role in the Battle of Misrata during the Libyan civil war in 2011. The Misratan Brigades involvement began on February 24 when Gaddafi loyalists, armed with rocket-propelled grenades and mortars, attacked opposition fighters guarding the airport. As fighting intensified, officers from an air force school near the airport mutinied, aiding the opposition in attacking a nearby military air base. The rebels utilized captured anti-aircraft weaponry against loyalist forces. In subsequent engagements, rebels claimed victories, destroying tanks, capturing soldiers, and pushing Gaddafi's forces back.

Notably, on April 23, loyalists troops army began withdrawing from Misrata, and rebels seized strategic locations, including a vital overpass bridge. Street fighting and booby-traps left by retreating soldiers led to casualties on both sides. The rebels later captured the main hospital, where loyalists had been holed up, marking a significant advancement. By May 13, the opposition asserted control over all of Misrata proper, with clashes persisting in surrounding areas. The Misrata Brigade's resilience and strategic maneuvers played a crucial role in the eventual liberation of Misrata from Gaddafi's forces during this intense and dynamic conflict.

=== Battle of Tripoli ===
During the Battle of Tripoli, the Misrata Brigades played a significant role in supporting rebel forces aiming to capture the Libyan capital. On August 21, boats from Misrata and Zliten landed rebel forces and arms in Tripoli, reinforcing the rebels already present in the city. The rebels, joined by those from Misrata, advanced towards the Mitiga airbase. On August 22, the Misrata local military council sent additional ships with fighters and ammunition as reinforcements to Tripoli.

Notably, during Operation Mermaid Dawn, rebel forces advanced eastwards from Zawiya, entering Tripoli through the Janzur suburb. They defeated the Khamis Brigade at its headquarters in Al Maya before entering Tripoli proper. The Misrata rebels landed by sea in the north, providing crucial support to the ongoing rebellion in the city. In a strategic move, rebels from Misrata intercepted and hacked into loyalists' communications, revealing panic among Gaddafi loyalists due to the swift rebel advance into the capital.

=== Battle of Sirte ===
In the 2011 Battle of Sirte, the Misrata Brigade, aligned with the National Transitional Council (NTC), played a pivotal role in the opposition's advance. NTC forces, including Misrata fighters, reached the western outskirts of Sirte, encountering resistance at the Gharbiyat Bridge. They entered the city, and conflicting reports emerged about control. The Misrata military council initially claimed city center control, but opposition forces later withdrew for casualty treatment. In Abu Hadi, NTC fighters from Misrata engaged in retaliation actions, such as looting, for what the loyalist troops did to Misratans during the Battle of Misrata. During the battle, Misrata fighters used an improvised steel-armored bulldozer. The conflict led to Gaddafi's death, with conflicting reports about the circumstances, including a Misratan rebel fighter's account of Gaddafi denying involvement in the damage to Misrata and silently appealing not to be killed.

== Factional violence ==
=== Siege of Bani Walid ===
In the siege of Bani Walid, clashes erupted on October 2 between pro-government militias from Misrata and local militiamen when thousands of fighters surrounded the city. On October 3, three policemen were killed in Susa, with a fourth critically injured. By October 8, thousands of soldiers surrounded Bani Walid, demanding the surrender of those responsible for torturing Omran Shaban to death, threatening to storm the town if the deadline wasn't met. Shelling was reported, but Misratan commanders denied having artillery for use. On October 12, clashes between Warfalla tribesmen and Misratans in Sirte led to a night-time curfew. Finally, on October 26, Misratan brigades aligned with the NTC successfully recaptured Bani Walid.

== Second Libyan civil war ==
=== War against ISIL ===
In June 2016, the Misrata-led brigade launched a military operation against ISIS in Sirte, Gaddafi's hometown, dubbed "Operation Bunyan al-Marsus". The operation involved fierce house-to-house fighting, initially slowed by snipers, explosives, and ammunition shortages. On October 7, 2016, Government of National Accord forces managed to separate the last ISIS-controlled areas in Sirte, cutting aid routes. During the advances, secret tunnels connecting besieged areas were discovered. Senior ISIS leader Abu al-Baraa al-Masri was killed, along with two snipers. By October 9, Misratan forces had encircled the 600 neighborhood, and militants surrendered, fearing use as suicide bombers. Misratan forces had earlier retaken the key Abu Grain position from ISIS, restoring the road link to Misratan positions in heavy fighting. Aircraft from Misrata also bombed positions west of Sirte, the ISIS stronghold.

=== War against LNA ===
As part of the GNA's Operation Volcano of Anger in April 2019, the Misrata Brigade actively engaged in the Western Libya campaign, mobilizing on the Tripoli frontlines to counter the LNA's attempt, led by General Khalifa Haftar, to capture the capital. Throughout this operation, the Misrata militias played a crucial role in preventing the advancement of Haftar's forces. In subsequent events, on January 28, 2020, a LNA Wing Loong II combat drone was shot down near Misrata, marking active defense measures against Haftar's forces. Additionally, on April 19, a combat drone was downed near Misrata in Alwhaska, emphasizing the continued hostilities and Misrata Brigade's commitment to resisting the LNA in the Western Libya region.

== Rebellion against Dbeibah ==
In response to the controversial meeting between Libyan Foreign Minister Najlaa al-Mangoush and her Israeli counterpart Eli Cohen, the Misrata Military Council declared its revival and rebellion against Prime Minister Abdulhamid al-Dbeibah's Government of National Unity (GNU). Alarmed by the perceived foreign interference and dismissing the GNU's actions as traitorous, the council, led by Salah Badi, had threatened to intervene "by force" to remove those in power.

== Notable members ==
- Fathi Bashagha, the former spokesperson for the Misrata Military council.
- Khalifa al-Zawawi, former head of the Misrata Military council.
- Omran Shaaban, the Misratan militaman who was held the most responsible by Gaddafi loyalists for the death of Gaddafi.
- Ibrahim ben Rajib, Brigadier general of the Misratan Brigades.
- Mohamed Eshtewi, former mayor of the Misrata Military council.
- Mohammed Abdul-Jawad, former Operations room chief.

== Brigades ==
=== Most notable battalions ===
- Al-Sumood Brigade
- Halbous Brigade
- Al-Mahjoob Brigade
- Nimr Brigade
- Asswehly Brigade
- Al-Ghiran Brigade
- Shahid Brigade
- Aswid Brigade
- Al-Horia Brigade
- Arise Brigade
- Al-Nasr Unit
- Lions of the Valley Brigade

The 200+ Battalions under the unification of the Misrata Military Council, officially joined the Libyan Army in June 2017. An announcement was made, with PC deputy chairman Ahmed Maiteeq making specific mentions of Bunyan Marsous, the operation that Misratan Militias launched against ISIL.

== Weapons and Equipment ==
Model	image	type	Calibre	Origin	Notes
FN FAL		Battle rifle	7×43mm		
Heckler & Koch G36 rifle		Assault rifle	5.56mm		
Machine gun		Fully-automatic firearm	14.5 mm, 12.7 mm		
ZU-23-2			23 mm,		
M40 recoilless rifle		Type of light artillery gun	106 mm		

=== UAVs ===
Name	Image	Country of origin	Type	Details
Bayraktar TB2		Turkey	Attack drone	Supplied by Qatar

=== Artillery ===
Name	Image	Type	Caliber	Details
BM-21 Grad		Multiple launch rocket system	122mm	
Truck-mounted Grad launchers		Multiple launch rocket system	122mm	

=== Tanks ===
Model	Image	Origin	Variant	Details
T-55		Soviet Union	T-55A T-55E	

=== Aircraft ===
Name	Image	Country of origin	Type	Details
MiG-23		Soviet Union	MiG-23MLD	
G-2 Galeb		Yugoslavia		
L-39ZA		Czechoslovakia	L-39, L-39ZO Albatros	
J-21 Jastreb		Yugoslavia		
Mi-24PM		Soviet Union		
Mi-8T		Soviet Union		
Mil Mi-24 Hind		Soviet Union	Mi-24A/Mi-25/Mi-35	
Mil Mi-17		Soviet Union	Mi-17	
Aermacchi SF.260		Italy	SF.260WL/ML	
MiG-25		Soviet Union		(Used in Libya Dawn)

== See also ==
- Tripoli Brigade
- Zintan Brigades
- Al-Ghiran Brigade
- Tariq Bin Ziad Brigade
- Libyan National Army
- National Liberation Army
