= Brigade 93 =

- Flag of the Libyan Arab Jamahiriya
- Leader: Salem al-Ouaer
- Dates active: January 2012 – Fall of 2012
- Group: Warfalla
- Headquarters: Bani Walid
- Active regions: Libya
- Ideology: Gaddafi loyalism
- Wars: 2011–2012 Libyan interfactional fighting; 2012 Bani Walid uprising

Brigade 93 was one of many militias that formed in the wake of the Libyan Civil War. It was based in Bani Walid, a former stronghold of the Gaddafi regime. The militia was mainly composed of those still loyal to Gaddafi.

The brigade was named after the 1993 attempted coup against Gaddafi by members of the Warfalla tribe. Salem al-Ouaer, a member of the Warfalla tribe who sided with Gaddafi during the coup, was believed to head the militia.

In January 2012, the brigade was involved in an insurgency in Bani Walid. On 25 January, their unexpected uprising led to the retreat of NTC forces from Bani Walid.

== Weapons and equipment ==
The brigade was said to possess heavy weapons, including 106 mm anti-tank guns.

When the brigade took over the May 28 Brigade base, they took heavy equipment, most notably tanks. In a video filmed after the takeover of the base by AFP, at least 4 tanks and a Grad rocket launcher were seen among the equipment captured by the militia.
