= International Criminal Court investigation in Libya =

Situation in Libya
- The seal of the International Criminal Court
- File no.: 01/11
- Referred by: UN Security Council
- Date referred: 26 February 2011
- Date opened: 3 March 2011
- Incident(s): First Libyan Civil War; Second Libyan Civil War
- Crimes: Crimes against humanity: · Murder · Imprisonment · Torture · Persecution · Inhumane acts War crimes: · Murder · Torture · Cruel Treatment · Outrage upon dignity

Status of suspects
- Muammar Gaddafi: Deceased
- Saif al-Islam Gaddafi: Deceased
- Abdullah Senussi: Charges dismissed
- Tohami Khaled: Deceased
- Mahmoud al-Werfalli: Deceased
- Saif Suleiman Sneidel: Fugitive
- Abdulrahem Al Kani: Fugitive
- Makhlouf Douma: Fugitive
- Nasser Al Lahsa: Fugitive
- Mohamed Salheen: Fugitive
- Abdelbari Al Shaqaqi: Fugitive
- Fathi Al Zinkal: Fugitive
- Osama Njeem: Fugitive
- Khaled Mohamed Ali El Hishri: In custody of ICC

The International Criminal Court investigation in Libya or the Situation in Libya is an investigation started in March 2011 by the International Criminal Court (ICC) into war crimes and crimes against humanity claimed to have occurred in Libya since 15 February 2011. The initial context of the investigation was the 2011 Libyan Civil War and the time frame of the investigation continued to include the 2019 Western Libya offensive.

== Initiation ==
The ICC investigation in Libya was initiated by the February 2011 United Nations Security Council Resolution 1970 in the context of the 2011 Libyan Civil War.

== First Libyan Civil War ==
Investigations started during the First Libyan Civil War, in 2011, led to several arrest warrants.

=== Arrest warrants ===
On 27 June 2011, the ICC issued warrants of arrest for the Libyan head of state, Muammar Gaddafi, for his second son, Saif al-Islam Gaddafi, and for Abdullah Senussi, Muammar Gaddafi's intelligence chief and brother-in-law, married to Muammar Gaddafi's sister-in-law, for murders and persecution of unarmed civilians as crimes against humanity under Articles 7(1)(a) and 7(1)(h) of the Rome Statute. The case against Muammar Gaddafi was closed by the ICC shortly after his death.

As of 9 May 2018, the ICC had outstanding warrants for the arrest of Tohami Khaled, former head of the Internal Security Agency of Libya during the final years of the Muammar Gaddafi government; and of Saif al-Islam Gaddafi, both of whom were believed by the ICC to remain at large. Saif al-Islam Gaddafi had been captured in Zintan in 2014 and rumoured to have been released in June 2018. Saif al-Islam Gaddafi was eventually shot dead in February 2026. Khaled died in Cairo, Egypt on 12 February 2021, as a result of complications related to COVID-19.

The ICC claims against Abdullah Senussi were concluded in July 2014 on the grounds that his case was being tried in Libyan courts and as of 9 May 2018, continued to monitor the progress of the Libyan legal proceedings against him. On 7 September 2022, the ICC terminated proceedings against Khaled, who was confirmed by the ICC to have died.

== Second Libyan Civil War ==
Investigations by the ICC continued during the Second Libyan Civil War, which started in 2014.

In April 2019, during the 2019 Western Libya offensive, ICC Chief Prosecutor Fatou Bensouda stated that both those directly committing war crimes in Libya during the conflict and their commanders would be liable to prosecution by the ICC, including anyone "ordering, requesting, encouraging or contributing in any other manner to the commission of crimes within the jurisdiction of the Court". Prime Minister Fayez al-Sarraj of the Tripoli-based Government of National Accord (GNA) stated on 17 April that the GNA would provide documentation to the ICC regarding the 16 April Grad shelling of residential areas that killed at least seven people and wounded 17, for which he attributed responsibility to Khalifa Haftar, leader of the Tobruk-based Libyan National Army (LNA). On 2 May, a spokesperson for the GNA, Muhanad Younis, stated that administrative responsibility had been allocated for documenting war crimes during the Western Libya offensive and providing the documentation to the ICC.

=== Arrest warrants ===
As of 6 April 2019, the ICC had two outstanding warrants for the arrest of LNA commander Mahmoud al-Werfalli, for involvement in seven alleged executions in and near Benghazi of 33 people during June 2016 to July 2017 and for allegedly executing ten people "in front of a cheering crowd" in Benghazi between 23 and 25 January 2018. As of November 2017, the LNA had claimed that al-Werfalli had been arrested and was being investigated by military authorities, while the ICC believed that he was not under arrest and was commanding the al-Saiqa brigade of the LNA. In February 2018, information about al-Werfalli's arrest status was unclear, and an Interpol red notice for his arrest was issued. On 15 June 2022, the ICC dropped its case against al-Werfalli, more than a year after he was killed in Benghazi. In August 2025, the ICC unsealed an arrest warrant for Saif Suleiman Sneidel, allegedly an associate of al-Werfalli who participated in executions by the al-Saiqa Brigade.

In October 2024, the ICC unsealed arrest warrants for six Libyans connected to the Al Kaniyat militia for war crimes allegedly committed during its occupation of Tarhuna from 2015 to 2020, following the discovery of mass graves in the town.

== Abuse in detention facilities ==
Since January 2025, Osama Najim (Almasri), a Libyan general, is wanted by the ICC for war crimes and crimes against humanity allegedly committed by RADA Special Deterrence Forces in Mitiga Prison in Tripoli. He was briefly arrested in Turin on 21 January 2025. The attorney-general of Rome stated that the arrest was invalid because there had not been prior discussions with the Italian Minister of Justice. A court of appeal in Rome agreed with the attorney-general. Najim was released and left Italy.

In July 2025, Khaled Mohamed Ali El Hishri (Al-Buti), another senior official of RADA Special Deterrence Forces, was arrested in Germany for war crimes and crimes against humanity committed in Mitiga Prison. He was transferred to ICC custody in The Hague on 1 December 2025. In July 2026, the Pre-Trial Chamber I confirmed the 17 charges of crimes against humanity and war crimes, including the torture, rape, murder, enslavement, and persecution of thousands of detainees in Mitiga Prison and Mitiga Compound between 1 May 2014 and 30 June 2020. Evidence for confirming the charges included witness statements by 47 former detainees and 16 other people.

== European anti-immigration policy ==
In October 2025, following an earlier 2019 submission to the ICC Libya investigation, lawyers Omer Shatz and Juan Branco and their colleagues submitted a 700-page request to the ICC to prosecute 122 named European Union (EU) officials for crimes against humanity for "migration policies [that the lawyers] argued led to the interception, detention, torture, killing and drowning of tens of thousands of people". Among the accused were senior EU officials Mark Rutte, Donald Tusk and Federica Mogherini and former Frontex chief Fabrice Leggeri. The request was "based on six years of investigation, interviews with more than 70 senior European officials, minutes of high-level European Council meetings and other confidential documents". According to the lawyers, whose group is named "EU Crimes Against Humanity", 37 people were suspected at the highest level of liability for the crimes, ranging from Ana Cristina Jorge (in relation to Operation Triton), Angela Merkel, Angelino Alfano through to Uwe Corsepius and Walter Stevens of the European External Action Service (in relation to Operation Sophia).
