= Huda Ben Amer =

Libyan former politician

- Born: Marj near Benghazi
- Citizenship: Libyan
- Education: Garyounis University
- Occupation: politician

Huda Ben Amer (Arabic: هدى بن عامر) is a former Libyan politician. A follower of the Libyan ruler, Colonel Muammar Gaddafi, she was the Secretary of the General People's Congress of Inspection People's Control and mayor of Benghazi until the Libyan Civil War.

== Early life ==
Ben Amer was born in Marj near Benghazi and attended the Garyounis University in Benghazi. Belonging to a poor family without influence, Ben Amer lived in a two-room shack in central Benghazi.

== Execution of Al-Sadek Hamed Al-Shuwehdy ==
Ben Amer would rise to national prominence at a public execution staged by the Gaddafi government in 1984. The event in Benghazi's basketball stadium had been announced as the trial of one of Gaddafi's political enemies, Al-Sadek Hamed Al-Shuwehdy, an engineer who had been peacefully campaigning against the colonel's rule. But instead the schoolchildren and students who had been assembled for the purpose were made to see Al-Shuwehdy's execution by hanging. While the hanged man writhed on the gallows, Ben Amer stepped forward and grabbed al-Shuwehdy's legs, pulling him down until he stopped struggling and died.

That display of ruthlessness, about which she later liked to boast—she is remembered in Benghazi by her saying "we don't need talking, we need hangings"—earned her the enduring loathing of the people of Benghazi and the nickname Huda Al-Shannaga—"Huda the Executioner". However, it impressed Gaddafi, who had been watching the execution on live television.

== Later career ==
He subsequently promoted Ben Amer to high government posts, including twice mayor of Benghazi and a leading member of the Legion Thoria, Gaddafi's organization of revolutionary committees. Eventually she became a favorite of Gaddafi, and one of the richest and most powerful women in Libya.

In the course of the national uprising in early 2011, a crowd stormed Ben Amer's sprawling mansion in Benghazi and, finding her gone, burned it to the ground. Later in March 2011, she was seen next to Gaddafi on one of his televised addresses. On 2 September 2011, Guma el-Gamaty, the UK coordinator of the National Transitional Council posted on Twitter that Ben Amer had been arrested in Tripoli by NTC forces.

Her arrest was never confirmed and she did not stand trial. She was interviewed by the Gaddafi loyalist-controlled Jamahiriya TV in 2019. In 2022, she gave another interview via the Clubhouse app where she accused Prime Minister Abdul Hamid Dbeibeh's family of corruption.

== See also ==
- Execution of Al-Sadek Hamed Al-Shuwehdy
