= Popular Front for the Liberation of Libya =

Political party in Libya

Popular Front for the Liberation of Libya الجبهة الشعبية لتحرير ليبيا
- Leader: Vacant
- Secretary-General: Vacant
- Founder: Saif al-Islam Gaddafi †
- Founded: 26 December 2016
- Preceded by: Great Socialist People's Libyan Arab Jamahiriya
- Ideology: Islamic socialism; Third International Theory; Gaddafi loyalism; Progressivism
- Political position: Left-wing
- Colours: Green
- House of Representatives: 0 / 200

Party flag

Website
- aljabhaalshaabiya.org (archived)

The Popular Front for the Liberation of Libya (PFLL; Arabic: الجبهة الشعبية لتحرير ليبيا, romanized: al-Jabhat al-Shaebiat li-Tahrir Libiya) is a Gaddafi loyalist militia and political party that aimed to elect Saif al-Islam Gaddafi, son of the late Libyan leader Muammar Gaddafi, as prime minister of Libya. Saif was assassinated in 2026.

== Aims and ideology ==
The PFLL follows a Gaddafi loyalist agenda. The party maintains that the First Libyan Civil War was the result of a conspiracy against Libya. It holds a negative view of the United Nations and NATO, which played a large role in overthrowing Gaddafi during the 2011 military intervention. Its stated aim is to build a sovereign state and "liberate the country from the control of terrorist organizations that use religion as a cover and are funded by foreign agencies." It has run advertisements opposing Turkish military intervention in the Second Libyan Civil War as well as the premiership of Fayez al-Sarraj. It opposes normalizing relations with Israel.

== Timeline of activities ==
- 26 December 2016: the PFLL was founded.
- October 2017: the PFLL was defeated in clashes with the Tripoli Revolutionaries Brigade, leading to the arrest of the military leader, Al-Mabrouk Ehnish, on the 16th.
- March 2018: Saif al-Islam Gaddafi announced his intention to run in the 2019 Libyan general election under the PFLL.
- 6 July 2019: it was reported that the PFLL had joined the Libyan National Army in the 2019 Western Libya offensive.
- 30 September 2019: the coordinator of the group's Ajdabiya branch, Ahmed Abdel Mawla, held a speech wherein he praised the Libyan National Army's advances against anti-LNA factions, re-affirmed the PFLL's support for Saif and denounced the 2011 uprising as a Turkish-Qatari conspiracy. He stated that "Since the conspiracy erupted in 2011, we see what happened in the homeland of the violation of sovereignty, and the loss of its political decision, and here we urge and stress that we all join together and all loyal to fight terrorism and uproot from the roots, these guilty of this era of heretical terrorists who destroyed the country, They destroyed everything."
- 3 November 2019: PFLL members held a demonstration in Bani Walid, waving flags reminiscent of the green flag used during the reign of Muammar Gaddafi.
- 2020: In this year, the party was intended to be replaced by a new party titled Libya Tomorrow (Arabic: Libya Al-Ghad), though these plans did not bear fruit.
- 7 February 2020: the PFLL held a panel discussion in Tunisia, titled "Tunisia's role in resolving the Libyan crisis between foreign interventions and the depth of belonging", wherein party members discussed the security situation in Libya in light of the civil war and the proliferation of arms carriers, as well as fears of foreign military intervention in Libya, which would further complicate the situation, according to participants. The panel was attended by a number of Tunisian political parties.
- 7 November 2020: the PFLL announced that it rejected the legitimacy of the Libyan Political Dialogue Forum.
- 31 July 2021: Saad al-Senussi al-Barasi, a PFLL leader, responded to an enquiry by Asharq Al-Awsat regarding circulated photos of Saif al-Islam Gaddafi. He described the photos as authentic, and sceptics as "enemies of the nation, and those who cling to power."
- 12 August 2022: Othman Barka, a representative of the PFLL in Egypt, stated he was in regular contact with Saif Gaddafi.
- 3 February 2026: Saif al-Islam Gaddafi was assassinated, and the group lost its leader.
