= Mohamed Eshtewi =

Libyan politician

- محمد اشتيوي

Mayor of Misurata
- In office July 2014 – 17 December 2017
- Succeeded by: Vacant

Personal details
- Died: 17 December 2017 Misurata, Libya

Mohamed Eshtewi (Arabic: محمد اشتيوي; died 17 December 2017) was a Libyan politician who served as Mayor of Misurata from 2014 until 2017, when he was assassinated.

== Life and career ==
In July 2014, Eshtewi and the Misurata City Council were elected with 80,000 votes.

With the rise of ISIS in Libya, Misurata became home to many people fleeing the violence. In May 2016, Eshtewi appealed for international aid, as his city had run out of food and housing for the refugees.

In spring 2017, Mayor Eshtewi and the Misurata Municipal Council were the subjects of opposition by the city's military council, who opposed Eshtewi's support for the Libyan Political Agreement and the Presidential Council. After a series of demonstrations, military council head Ibrahim Ben Rajeb, an ally of the nationwide anti-Presidential Council movement led by Khalifa Ghwell, attempted to stage a coup d'état. On 21 March 2017, the military council announced that the municipal council had been dismissed and replaced by a steering committee. The attempted coup was unsuccessful, largely ignored by municipal staff and the general population. On 13 April 2017, demonstrators from the same group protested the city's municipal council by blocking up the main entrance to the council building, constructing a cement-brick wall and even plastering it. A court order to remove the wall was not immediately carried out, and council employees who arrived to take it down were prevented by the protestors.

On 3 May 2017, Eshtewi was forced to resign by protesters who forced their way into a meeting he was holding with Sirte mayor Mukhtar al-Madani and Bunyan Marsous representatives. The protestors stormed the building around 8 pm, pushed and shouted at Eshtewi, and refused to let him exit. There were unconfirmed gunshots, but no weapon was pointed at him. Eshtewi was forced to sign a statement of resignation, but revoked it soon after, stating that he had signed it under duress. In a statement, he vowed to continue his mayoral duties as normal.

== Assassination ==
In late afternoon, Sunday, 17 December 2017, Eshtewi arrived at the Misurata Airport from Istanbul, Turkey, where he and numerous other city councilmen and elders had been on an official business trip. Just before sunset, he left the airport and was being driven back home from the airport with his brother Ahmed. Their car was attacked as it stopped at traffic lights on the airport road. Eshtewi's brother was shot in the head, and Eshtewi was kidnapped. His body was found several hours later outside the private Safwa Hospital in Misrata. There were three bullet wounds to his back, and bullet wounds in his legs, but the cause of death was a sharp blow to the head, according to a Misrata Central Hospital spokesman.

=== Aftermath ===
After Eshtewi's death, the City of Misurata declared three days of mourning, including public funeral prayers held at a sports venue. Eshtewi was buried on Monday, 18 December 2017, around 2:00 pm. Eshtewi's brother, Ahmed, is in serious but stable condition, and is recovering in Misrata Central Hospital's intensive care unit.

The motive behind the attack is unclear, as are the identities of the perpetrators. Suspicion has been raised by some that Islamists and militants were responsible, though none of the armed groups active in the region immediately claimed responsibility. One senior local official told the Libya Herald that he believed local groups were not the perpetrators, but that Gaddafi or Haftar sympathizers or ISIS could be responsible. The Misurata Security Directorate formed a task force team to investigate the murder. Police spokesman Mohamed Ben Al-Amin urged restraint and cautioned not to accuse certain groups without evidence.

=== Reactions ===
Following Eshtewi's assassination, many important Libyan political figures and institutions released statements. The High Council of State, Presidential Council, and House of Representatives expressed condolences and condemned the murder. Prime Minister and Presidential Council Vice Chairman Ahmed Maiteeq praised Eshtewi's courage and peacemaking efforts, and lamented that Libya was still "bleeding" after the revolution. The Misurata City Council expressed its "deep sorrow and grief" at the murder. Official condemnations of the attack followed from the municipal governments of Sabratha, Tripoli, and Zliten. Misurata's rival cities in the east, Zintan and Bani Walid, did not release statements.

Peter Millett, the British Ambassador to Libya, tweeted that he was "deeply saddened" by the "senseless murder." The Italian embassy in Tripoli released a statement echoing Millett's sentiments. The French Foreign Ministry called the murder a "cowardly act" that indicated an urgent need for a political solution to the current crisis. The Turkish foreign ministry described the "heinous assassination" as an attempt to destabilize Misurata and Libya. United Nations envoy to Libya Ghassan Salamé condemned the killing, calling Eshtewi a contributor to peace in Misurata and Libya.

In addition, Libyan state electricity company GECOL, the National Forces Alliance, and tribal leaders have expressed their regrets.

== See also ==
- List of people assassinated in Africa
