= Joint Operations Force =

Libyan military unit

- قوة العمليات المشتركة
- Founder: Abdul Khaliq al-Daikh
- Leader: Colonel Ibrahim Mohamed
- Dates active: 2011-present
- Headquarters: Misrata
- Active regions: Libya
- Ideology: Anti-Gaddafism; Democracy; Sharia law
- Size: 6,000+
- Part of: Misrata Military Council
- Wars: the 2011–2012 Libyan interfactional fighting
- Website: https://www.facebook.com/J.O.F.GOV.LY?locale=ar_AR

The Joint Operations Force (Arabic: قوة العمليات المشتركة), formerly known as the 24th Infantry Battalion, is a large military unit composed of well trained military personnel based in the city of Misrata. It has been known to fight off Islamist extremist groups, such as ISIL and Al-Qaeda, as well as participating operations that intercept human traffickers and fuel smugglers. This force commonly advocates for a single unified Libyan military as well as enhancing the security and stability of the country and protecting national sovereignty.

== Origins ==
After the 3-month siege that the city of Misrata endured, many battalions began to form in order to resist the constant bombardment by Pro-Gaddafi forces. One of them being the 24th Infantry Battalion.

After the Libyan revolution, this Battalion continued to participate in counter-Terrorism operations. It was later merged with various other groups to form the Joint Operations Force in 2013.

== Funding ==
As of 2023, the J.O.F has been receiving an annual funding of 40,000,000 LYD from the Libyan government. These funds are directed towards countering terrorism operations, human trafficking acts, as well as keeping the city under control, which has resulted in much lower crime rate, making Misrata the safest city in Libya.

== Operations ==
On September 7, 2021, the Misratan Joint Operations Force reported the capture of a high-ranking member of ISIS, Embark al-Khazm, in Bani Walid. Acting on orders from the Attorney General, the Joint Operations Force conducted the arrest. Prime Minister Abdul Hameed Dabaiba of the GNU commended the Joint Operations Force for their efforts and welcomed Khazm's arrest.

13 March 2023, the J.O.F seized a large shipment of drugs in the port of Misrata. The drugs was discovered to be ecstasy, and was estimated at 1.7 million pills. They were hidden inside a number of cars on board a ship coming from the port of Antwerp, Belgium, carrying about 2,400 cars.

On 8 May 2023, the J.O.F announced the successful eradication of 88,000 hallucinogenic tablets discovered aboard a vessel at the Misrata seaport. Acting in accordance with legal protocols and in collaboration with Misrata's port customs, the entire shipment was destroyed to prevent its circulation. The tablets, identified as Levitril or "Rouge," were concealed within two vehicles on board a ship arriving from Italy. This operation marks a significant interception in combating illicit drug trafficking.

14 May 2023, the J.O.F announced the apprehension of a criminal group responsible for kidnapping and extorting foreign medical personnel from a hospital in Misrata. Following a report of the incident, the Attorney General in Misrata directed a thorough investigation and rescue operation. Subsequently, the kidnappers were captured, and the victims were safely rescued. The arrested individuals confessed to their crimes and were taken into legal custody for prosecution.

June 2023, the J.O.F, in collaboration with the Misrata Free Zone customs center, intercepted a large quantity of diesel fuel intended for smuggling out of the country via the Misrata sea port. The fuel, concealed within 14 containers labeled for export as used oils, had a total capacity of 20,000 liters each. Routine inspections led to the discovery, and those responsible were detained pending legal action.

On April 20, 2024, the J.O.F received a report stating that two citizens had found a suspicious plastic bag on the beach in a certain area of Misrata city. Immediately, patrols of the force headed to the location where the bag was found. Upon inspection, the bag was found to contain approximately 25 tightly sealed plastic packages containing white powder suspected to be cocaine. In appreciation of the citizens' efforts and "trust in the Joint Operations Force," a financial reward was given to them, "We urge all citizens to promptly report any suspicious materials or bags that may pose a threat to the security and safety of our country and its people".

== February 17 ==
During February 17 Annual festival, the February 17 Revolutionary forces in Misrata staged large parades in various locations, including Al-Jazeerat al-A'lam and Tripoli Street, marking the thirteenth anniversary of Gaddafi's overthrow. Tens of thousands of Misratan residents came together to commemorate the revolution. The J.O.F showcased readiness to combat terrorism in all forms, as well as opposition to corruption in all forms.
