= Tohami Khaled =

Libyan military personnel (1942/1946–2021)

Personal details
- Born: c. 1942 or c. 1946 Janzur, Libya
- Died: 12 February 2021 (aged 74–75) Cairo, Egypt

Tohami Mohamed Khaled (also known as al-Tuhamy Mohamed Khaled; Arabic: التهامي محمد خالد) (Note: Khaled's name has multiple spellings and variations when transliterated into latin script. According to the International Criminal Court and the United States federal government he also known as al-Tohamy Khaled, al-Touhami Khalid, Touhami Khalid, Touhamy Khaled, Tourhi Kalid, al-Tuhami Khaled, and Khaled al-Tuhami.) (born c. 1942 or c. 1946 (Note: The International Criminal Court lists his year of birth as 1942 whereas the United States federal government lists it as 1946.) – 12 February 2021) was the head of the Internal Security Agency of Libya during the final years of the government of Muammar Gaddafi. He was indicted in the International Criminal Court in 2013 on charges of crimes against humanity and war crimes allegedly committed during the First Libyan Civil War.

== Childhood and military career ==
Khaled was born near Janzur, Libya in either 1942 or 1946. He served in the armed forces of Libya, in which he supported the 1969 Libyan coup d'état, then he obtained the rank of lieutenant general and was ultimately appointed to lead the Internal Security Agency ("ISA"), Gaddafi's secret police force, which he led during the outbreak of the Libyan Civil War in 2011. During the civil war, the United States imposed sanctions against Khaled, which would have frozen any assets that he could have had in the United States.

Following the defeat of Gaddafi's forces during the Libyan Civil War in 2011, Khaled was believed to have fled to Egypt. The International Criminal Court stated that he is alleged to have had "at least 10 different passports, some issued under other identities."

== International Criminal Court charges ==
Tohami Khaled was indicted on 13 April 2013 on four counts of crimes against humanity and three counts of war crimes with regard to the situation in Libya. The arrest warrant against him was unsealed on 24 April 2017, as the Interpol put him on a red notice. From February 2011 through August 2011, members of the ISA arrested persons who were perceived by the Libyan government to be opposed to the rule of the Gaddafi. Persons arrested by the ISA "were subjected to various forms of mistreatment, including severe beatings, electrocution, acts of sexual violence and rape, solitary confinement, deprivation of food and water, inhumane conditions of detention, mock executions, threats of killing and rape". The ISA conducted these activities throughout Libya, including in the cities of Benghazi, Misrata, Sirte, Tajura, Tawergha, Tripoli, and Zawiya. Khaled is accused of being responsible for crimes against humanity and war crimes both as a participant and as the commander of the ISA. Specifically, the prosecutor alleges that Khaled is responsible for the crimes against humanity of imprisonment, torture, other inhumane acts, and persecution and the war crimes of torture, cruel treatment, and outrages upon personal dignity.

As of January 2021, Khaled was wanted by the ICC, together with Saif al-Islam Gaddafi and Libyan National Army commander Mahmoud al-Werfalli. On 7 September 2022, the ICC terminated proceedings against Khaled, who was confirmed by the ICC to have died.

== Death ==
Libyan channels and news sites reported the death of Al-Tuhamy Khaled in Cairo on 12 February 2021, from complications related to COVID-19. His death would later be confirmed by the International Criminal Court in September 2022.
