= Al-Warfalli =

Al-Warfalli (Arabic: الورفلي), also romanized as al-Werfalli, el-Warfally, Ourfelli and other variants, is a Libyan surname originally designating people from the Warfalla tribe. Notable people with the name include:

- Hanene Ourfelli (born 1986), Tunisian weightlifter
- Mahmoud al-Werfalli (1978–2021), Libyan general in the Libyan National Army and war criminal
- Mahmoud Jibril el-Warfally (1952–2020), Libyan politician, interim Prime Minister of Libya during the overthrow of Muammar Gaddafi
- Sanad Al Warfali (born 1992), Libyan footballer
