= Daou al-Salhine al-Jadak =

Personal details
- Born: Bani Walid, Libya
- Died: 28 September 2011 Bani Walid, Libya

Military service
- Allegiance: Libya National Transitional Council (2011)
- Branch/service: National Liberation Army (Libya)
- Years of service: 2011
- Rank: Field commander
- Commands: Bani Walid
- Battles/wars: 2011 Libyan civil war *Battle of Bani Walid

Daou al-Salhine al-Jadak (Arabic: داو الصالحين الجداك) was a field commander for the forces of the National Transitional Council of Libya during the 2011 Libyan civil war. Jadak was imprisoned for more than 18 years by Muammar Gaddafi's regime and led anti-Gaddafi forces in their battle for control of Bani Walid which eventually succeeded in October. Jadak came from Bani Walid himself. He had told AFP two days before he was killed that he had been imprisoned for more than 18 years for helping organise a 1993 rebellion.

== Death ==
Jadak was among 11 NTC fighters killed in a heavy rocket barrage at Bani Walid by Pro-Gaddafi forces. His car was struck by a rocket as he headed towards the front. This was confirmed by NTC chief negotiator Abdullah Kenshil.
