= Execution of Al-Sadek Hamed Al-Shuwehdy =

1984 Public political execution

Al-Sadek Hamed Al-Shuwehdy
- Born: Al-Sadek Hamed Al-Shuwehdy c. 1954; Benghazi, Libya
- Died: June 5, 1984 (age 30); Benghazi, Libya
- Cause of death: Execution by hanging
- Occupations: College student; Engineer

Al-Sadek Hamed Al-Shuwehdy (or Sadiq Hamed Shwehdi) (c. 1954 – June 5, 1984) was a Libyan college student and aeronautical engineer who was publicly executed at the conclusion of a show trial at a basketball stadium in Benghazi, Libya. The trial and execution were broadcast live on Libyan state television. Al-Shuwehdy had returned three months earlier from the United States where he had been studying, and had begun to protest against Gaddafi's regime.

While working as an engineer at an airport, Al-Shuwehdy joined friends who were campaigning against Gaddafi. Libyan police later seized him at his home; he was executed a few months later. Al-Shuwehdy's family never received his body; mourners later arriving at their house were physically intimidated. After his death, members of his family also experienced difficulty finding employment or securing places at a university. Al Shuwehdy's execution is one of the most notable Libyan executions carried out under former dictator Muammar Gaddafi.

== Background ==
Born around 1954, Al-Shuwehdy grew up in Benghazi. His early years were marked by a rapidly changing landscape, as Libya transitioned from a monarchy under the Senussi dynasty to the regime of Muammar Gaddafi in 1969. Despite the unstable environment, Al-Shuwehdy's family encouraged his academic pursuits, leading him to develop a keen interest in aeronautical engineering. In 1976, he took part in the protests in Benghazi.

Al-Shuwehdy travelled to the United States to work as an engineer, where he immersed himself in his studies. The educational experience in America was transformative for Al-Shuwehdy, providing him with a deep understanding of aeronautical engineering and exposing him to democratic ideals and the importance of civil liberties.

Upon completing his studies, Al-Shuwehdy returned to Libya in 1984, and immediately began campaigning against Gaddafi's regime.

Around 1984, Al-Shuwehdy was arrested by Libyan police after being accused of being a part of a plot by the Muslim Brotherhood to assassinate Gaddafi. Al-Shuwehdy's family was given no information about his whereabouts or the charges against him.

== Trial ==
The trial and execution was witnessed in the stadium by thousands of youth, particularly high school and university students, who had been specifically bussed in for the occasion. Al-Shuwehdy was alone in the centre of the stadium, seated on the court with his hands bound behind his back, a microphone placed before him. He wept as he confessed to his crime of joining the "stray dogs"; this was Gaddafi’s terminology for dissidents, before being sentenced to death.

He was accused of plotting to assassinate Gaddafi. The court described him as "a terrorist from the Muslim Brotherhood, an agent of America". Two young men ran up to the judges and begged them for mercy, and a gallows was produced in the middle of the basketball court.

== Execution ==
As Al-Shuwehdy kicked and writhed on the gallows, Huda Ben Amer, then a young Gaddafi loyalist, stepped forward, and grabbed his legs, pulling hard on his body until the struggling stopped. Her actions brought her to the attention of Gaddafi, and she was given a government position and rapidly promoted in the ranks. She later twice became the mayor of Benghazi and one of Libya's richest and most powerful women. Her intervention during Al-Shuwehdy's execution earned her the nickname "Huda the Executioner". Amer was captured in Tripoli by National Transitional Council forces during the Libyan civil war in September 2011.

Al-Shuwehdy's execution happened a month after a raid on Gaddafi's Bab al-Azizia compound carried out by the National Front for the Salvation of Libya with the backing of the CIA. Al-Shuwehdy's cousin Magdi was killed in the raid. In the aftermath, 2,000 people were arrested and twelve were publicly hanged in their home towns. Other hangings were later broadcast, and re-broadcast, on Libyan state television.

== Live broadcast ==
The execution was broadcast live on state television. The film of his trial and execution was rediscovered in 2011 during the Libyan civil war by Peter Bouckaert, a researcher for Human Rights Watch. Bouckaert was assisted by British photographer Tim Hetherington. It was the last project that Hetherington was working on at the time of his death. The trial was viewed live on television by many Libyans but had not been seen in full since 1984. The footage of the trial was given to Bouckaert by Al-Shuwehdy's brother Ibrahim, who gave four Beta video tapes to be digitized and preserved.

== See also ==
- Mahmoud Asgari and Ayaz Marhoni
