= Assassination of Saif al-Islam Gaddafi =

2026 shooting in Zintan, Libya

- Part of the Libyan crisis
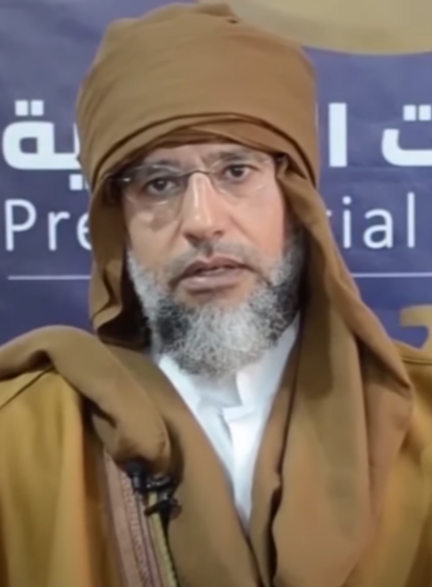
- Gaddafi announcing his candidacy at a press conference in 2021

- Location within Libya
- Location: Zintan, Libya
- Date: 3 February 2026; 8 months ago
- Target: Saif al-Islam Gaddafi
- Attack type: Assassination; mass shooting
- Deaths: 1 (Saif Al-Islam)
- Assailants: 4 gunmen

On 3 February 2026, Saif al-Islam Gaddafi, a Libyan politician and son of Muammar Gaddafi, was assassinated at age 53 in Zintan, Libya, by four masked gunmen. At the time of his death, he was a candidate for the Libyan presidential election scheduled in April 2026.

== Background ==
Gaddafi was wanted by the International Criminal Court since 2011, which had indicted him on two counts of crimes against humanity of "murder and persecution" for his role in suppressing the Libyan opposition protests against his father's regime during the 2011 Libyan civil war.

In 2015, a court in Tripoli sentenced him to death by firing squad in absentia for war crimes committed during his role in the crackdown. However, the Zintan Brigades that were holding him since his capture in 2011 refused to hand him over as they did not recognize the authority of the internationally recognized Tripoli government or its courts. He was released by the Zintan militia in 2017 after he was given full amnesty by Khalifa Haftar, whose Libyan National Army dominates eastern and central Libya and holds influence over Zintan. Gaddafi remained underground in Zintan since his release to avoid assassination.

In 2021, Gaddafi was a candidate for the presidential election that had been scheduled in 2021. He was disqualified under Article 10/7 of the electoral law for having been convicted of a crime, and under Article 17/5 for not providing a certificate showing a clean criminal record. Gaddafi tried to appeal his disqualification, which led to a "collapse of the election process and [a] return to political stalemate", according to Al Monitor. Polling in 2021 placed Gaddafi as a leading candidate ahead of most other nominees, alongside Abdul Hamid Dbeibeh. In November 2025, the Libyan High National Election Commission (HNEC) stated that it would be "ready to begin implementing presidential and parliamentary elections in mid-April 2026" if funds were available and if the 6+6 Committee finalised electoral laws.

== Assassination ==
On 3 February 2026, four masked gunmen raided Gaddafi's home after disabling security cameras. Gaddafi was in his garden and attempted to fight back but was reportedly killed at 3:30 p.m. The four gunmen then fled the scene.

== Investigation ==
The Public Prosecution Office in Tripoli announced that an official investigation into Gaddafi's assassination had begun. The 444th Infantry Brigade denied involvement in the assassination. The Office has announced, saying three suspects have been identified and arrest orders issued.

== Burial ==
On 6 February 2026, Gaddafi was buried in Bani Walid, in a funeral attended by thousands, including Gaddafi loyalists. He was buried next to his younger brother Khamis Gaddafi.

== Impact for Gaddafi loyalists ==
At the time of death, Saif was acknowledged to be the only person who was capable of unifying Gaddafi loyalists. As a result, his death would mark the end of Gaddafi loyalists being able to have a single "unifying figure" to rally behind.

== See also ==
- Killing of Muammar Gaddafi
- Killing of Qusay and Uday Hussein
