= Battle of Bani Walid =

2011 battle of the Libyan Civil War

Coordinates: 31°46′N 13°59′E

- Part of 2011 Libyan Civil War
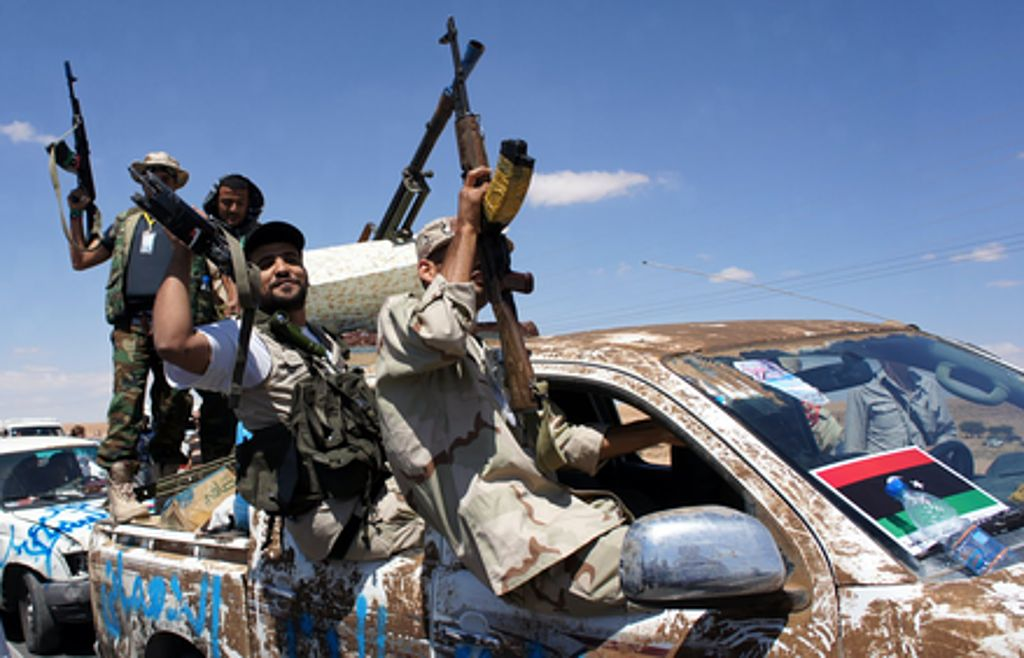
- Fighters arrive from around the region to join the NTC push into Bani Walid
Date	8–30 September 2011 (3 weeks and 1 day) (First phase); 9–17 October 2011 (1 week and 1 day) (Second phase)
Location	Bani Walid, Libya
Result	Pro-Gaddafi victory (First phase); Anti-Gaddafi victory (Second phase): Pro-Gaddafi forces repel four rebel attacks on the town; Anti-Gaddafi forces capture the town after the fifth attack; Local militia recapture the city on 23 January 2012

Belligerents
(Libya) National Transitional Council: National Liberation Army; NATO command	(Libya) Gaddafi Loyalists: Remnants of the Libyan Armed Forces; Paramilitary forces

Commanders and leaders
(Libya) Daou al-Salhine al-Jadak † (Libya) Musa Yunis	(Libya) Saif al-Islam Gaddafi (Libya) Imhamed Al Hameel

Strength
5,000 fighters 150 technicals	2,000 fighters Several dozen technicals and BM-21 Grad launchers

Casualties and losses
85–91 killed 215–231 wounded	7–9 killed (In September, October casualties unknown); 315–317 captured (NTC claim)
- 19–22 civilians killed

The Battle of Bani Walid was a military operation in the Libyan Civil War conducted by anti-Gaddafi forces in September and October 2011, in an effort to take control of the desert city of Bani Walid from pro-Gaddafi forces. It began following days of force buildup on the part of the attackers, as well as skirmishes around the city.

== Background ==
Following the collapse of loyalist forces in Zawiya, Zliten and finally Tripoli in mid to late August, NLA forces advanced southwards from Misrata and Tarhuna towards the apparent pro-Gaddafi stronghold of Bani Walid.

=== Advance ===
3 September

Negotiations between representatives of the National Transitional Council, and tribal leaders from Bani Walid broke down. NLA fighters armed with heavy machine guns and anti-aircraft guns advanced from Tarhuna towards Bani Walid after negotiations appeared to have failed.

4 September

NLA forces were 60 km from the city, according to the NTC.

5 September

The NTC announced that "the door is still open for negotiations", referring to attempts to get Bani Walid to surrender to NLA forces peacefully. It was reported that NLA units were only 40 km from the city.

6 September

The NTC claimed that negotiations had been resumed over Bani Walid, although there was some confusion in NTC/NLA ranks over the actual outcome, as loyalist elements in the city tried to block negotiations, fearing reprisals.

7 September

Tribal representatives from Bani Walid, who had been negotiating with the NTC, were shot at by diehard loyalists in the city as they returned, prompting NLA forces to prepare for an attack on the town itself. It was also reported that Col. Gaddafi and his sons, Saif al-Islam, Hannibal, and Mutassim, had passed through Bani Walid on their way south.

== Battle ==
=== Loyalists fire the first shots ===
8 September

Gaddafi claimed that Bani Walid would never surrender, in an audio message aired on Syrian TV, and urged his people to continue the fight. Loyalist troops fired missiles, which landed in Wadi Dinar, about 20 km from Bani Walid.

=== NTC offensive repelled ===
9 September

The National Liberation Army said its fighters had entered Bani Walid from the north and east, penetrating to within two kilometres of the city centre, and heavy street fighting was underway. The offensive apparently began in response to a Grad rocket barrage against besieging anti-Gaddafi forces originating from within the city.

Anti-Gaddafi troops said they had lost at least one fighter in a skirmish on the outskirts of the city, also claiming they had killed two pro-Gaddafi soldiers and captured ten.

Al Jazeera reported unconfirmed allegations that anti-Gaddafi dissidents within the city were rising up in an effort to expel pro-Gaddafi elements, but stressed it could not corroborate the claims.

10 September

Opposition forces withdrew from the city, after encountering much fiercer resistance than they expected and suffering heavy casualties, in anticipation of NATO air-strikes on loyalist positions. The rebels had fallen back a full 40 kilometres from the city. However, NTC negotiators and field commanders said that they did not intend to enter the city the previous day, and that the incursion into the town was a result of anti-Gaddafi forces engaging in skirmishes with loyalist snipers placed in the city. The NTC ceasefire had not yet expired when the fighting occurred, and opposition fighters outside the city wanted to give anti-Gaddafi residents a chance to stage an uprising. The main attack, they said, was yet to come.

Later during the day, a renewed assault was launched after anti-Gaddafi forces received reinforcements, with rebels saying that they had taken the northern gate to the city and met up with local resistance fighters. Unconfirmed reports of loyalist reinforcements prompted opposition forces to increase their numbers to put increased pressure on the loyalist-held city.

The pro-Gaddafi forces in Bani Walid were reported to include members of the Legion Thoria, a part of Gaddafi's secret police, as well as members of the elite Khamis Brigade and mercenaries from Darfur, according to opponents of the old regime.

11 September

Large numbers of anti-Gaddafi reinforcements arrived and massed outside the city gates. Opposition forces had pushed once again into the city, and by dusk, residents and anti-Gaddafi fighters claimed that Bani Walid was largely under anti-Gaddafi control, with loyalist holdouts concentrated in the souq at the city centre. Meanwhile, a local pro-Gaddafi radio station broadcast a call to arms urging the city's inhabitants to join forces against the former rebels.

12 September

Residents, who were evacuating from the city, stated that rebel forces had only managed to reach the northern outskirts of the town and were still a full 10 kilometers from the city center, contradicting earlier opposition claims of major advances. It also surfaced that, the day before, some rebels had in fact needed to pull back from Bani Walid due to inter-factional tensions among various opposition groups.

14 September

Due to the threat of a major battle occurring in the city, as well as fuel and food shortages, refugees began to stream out of Bani Walid, following NTC demands for civilians to evacuate the city. NTC officials said over radio broadcasts that Bani Walid would face a full-scale attack within two days. Anti Gaddafi forces said they were prepared to use heavy weapons to take the city, due to Gaddafi loyalists having already deployed their own heavy weapons.

16 September

NTC forces were reported to have streamed towards Bani Walid, with orders to take the city from Gaddafi loyalists in a major push. However, later in the day, Reuters reported that they were retreating following heavy resistance from the loyalist forces.

18 September

Reuters reported fighters on pickup trucks launched another attack on the city. But, later in the day, NTC forces fled the city in another chaotic retreat after their assault was repelled.

=== Stalemate ===
19 September

Two Turkish C-130 Hercules cargo aircraft dropped humanitarian aid for the residents of Bani Walid. One of the aircraft came under attack from the ground while flying over the city.

21 September

NTC fighters moved tanks into the area, while boredom was rampant among opposition fighters at the frontline resulting in several deaths among fighters who were mishandling their weapons.

24 September

Opposition forces claimed that 30 NTC fighters were killed and another 50 were wounded since the start of the battle, but other reports put the number closer to 40 dead and more than 120 wounded.

=== Loyalist counter-attack ===
27 September

Opposition forces retreated from some of the parts of Bani Walid they previously held due to intense loyalist fire.

28 September

During an artillery barrage on the opposition troops the top rebel commander leading the battle for Bani Walid, commander Daou al-Salhine al-Jadak, was killed along with 10 other fighters.

30 September

Heavy loyalist shelling hit opposition lines west and south of the city. One NTC field commander stated that the attacks were the most intense since the start of the battle.

=== Failed attack on the airport ===
9 October

An NTC spokesman reported its forces had captured the villages of Teninai and Shuwaikh, 32 kilometres (20 mi) south, and the Bani Walid airport on the western edge of the town.

10 October

Just a day after the opposition captured the airport, the loyalists took it back, killing 17 NTC fighters and wounding 80.

=== Fifth attack and takeover ===
15 October

NTC forces claimed that their forces managed to capture the hospital and the industrial area and had moved into the market area where their progress was stalled by snipers. They also claimed to have surrounded loyalist forces in the "Olive Tree" region where the loyalists were running out of ammunition.

16 October

The opposition claimed that they had moved even further, allegedly taking control over the center of Bani Walid and the northern part, while loyalist forces were claimed by the opposition to be stationed in the Dahra district, in southern Bani Walid. At the end of the day Mahmoud Tawfiq, a spokesman of the southern front in Bani Walid, said to Xinhua, that fighters from the southern front entered the center of the city and were expecting to meet with units from the east and west on 17 October, while Salah Matouk, a field commander at Bani Walid, told local channel Liberal that the Bani Walid battle had been resolved completely in favor of the NTC fighters, who were waiting for the next morning to start the mopping-up operations. None of the NTC claims from the previous two days were by this point independently verified. The overall commander of opposition troops at Bani Walid, Musa Yunis, only stated during the evening that combat operations at the city had resumed and that they had advanced from the northern and southern front. BBC news and AFP reiterated that the extent of the rebel advance into the city remained unclear and unverified and an NTC commander said that their forces had been in the town in the afternoon, after they attacked during the morning, but that they encountered heavy resistance. Reuters reported that the opposition advance into Bani Walid had been hindered by snipers.

17 October

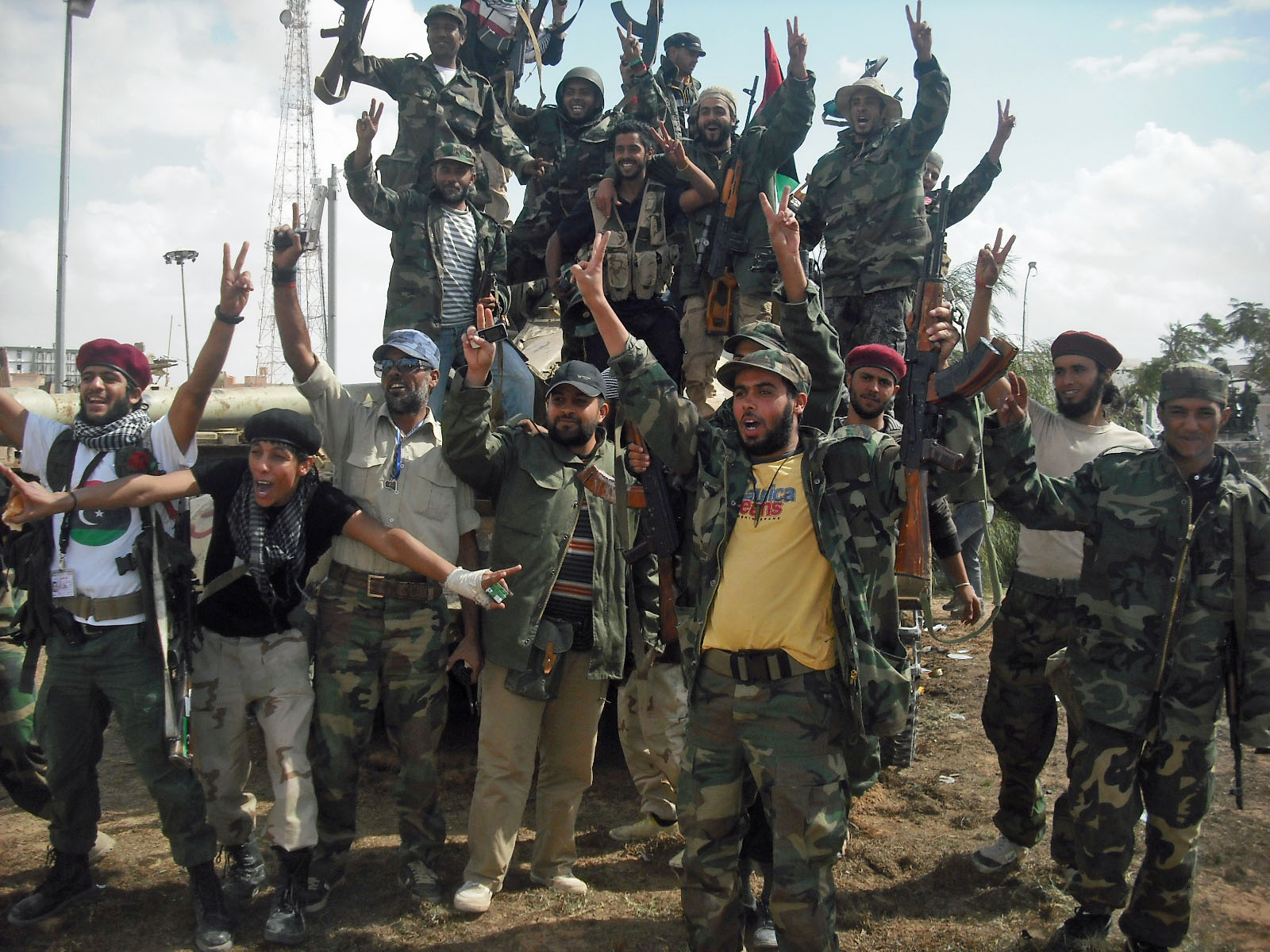
Anti-Gaddafi fighters celebrate victory on 17 October 2011

By 17 October, anti-Gaddafi fighters claimed to have moved into the town and made significant advances. Anti-Gaddafi forces seized the local radio station, which Gaddafi had been using to help broadcast messages in the past few weeks. By mid-afternoon, an Al Jazeera correspondent reported that the transitional government's fighters had captured the city, though they claimed there were still some small pockets of resistance to be dealt with. By the end of the day, Reuters correspondents in the city confirmed that there were no signs of fighting in the city, while the new Libyan flag was hoisted in the central square and a local commander announced that his forces had taken control of the whole city. It was later reported that the quick takeover of Bani Walid, following more than a month of heavy fighting and a prolonged stalemate, was the result of a negotiated surrender by the loyalist forces.

19 October

A South African bodyguard claimed to have seen Saif al-Islam Gaddafi escape the city even though his motorcade had been hit by a NATO air strike.

== Aftermath ==
A low-level insurgency in and around Bani Walid persisted even after the official end of the war on 23 October 2011, though it was unclear if either the Warfalla fighters loyal to Gaddafi or the NTC forces garrisoning the town suffered any casualties. Reuters reported many residents were upset over the level of damage and looting in Bani Walid and blamed the new Libyan authorities.

On 23 January 2012, around 100–150 local fighters attacked the main NTC army base in Bani Walid, killing 4 former rebels and wounding 20 others.

== NATO Strikes ==
NATO Strikes: 24 August – 17 October
Date	Vehicles	Tanks	Missiles and Missile Launchers	Buildings
24 August	0	0	1 Anti Tank Rifle	0
27 August	0	0	0	1 Military Supply Storage
29 August	0	0	0	2 Command and Control Nodes, 1 Military Ammo Storage Facility
30 August	0	0	3 Surface to Surface Missile Launchers	1 Military Ammo Storage Facility, 1 Military Tank/Multiple Rocket Launcher Storage Facility, 1 Military Facility
31 August	0	0	0	1 Ammo Storage Facility, 1 Command and Control Node
1 September	1 Armed Vehicle	0	0	1 Ammo Storage Facility
2 September	0	0	0	1 Military Vehicle Storage Facility
3 September	0	0	0	1 Ammo Storage Facility
8 September	0	0	0	1 Surface to Surface Missile Storage Facility
9 September	1 Armed Vehicle	0	0	0
10 September	2 Armed Vehicles	1	1 Multiple Rocket Launcher	0
14 September	2 Armed Vehicles	0	0	0
19 September	0	0	0	1 Command and Control Node
22 September	0	0	0	1 Ammunition Storage and Military Barracks Facility
26 September	0	0	0	2 Bunkers/Command and Control Nodes, 1 Firing Point
29 September	0	0	1 Multiple Rocket Launcher	1 Ammunition Storage Facility
1 October	0	0	0	1 Multiple Rocket Launcher Firing Point, 1 Ammunition Storage Facility
4 October	0	0	0	1 Command and Control Node
5 October	0	0	0	6 Command and Control Nodes, 1 Military Installation, 1 Military Staging Location
6 October	0	1	0	0
9 October	3 Armed Vehicles	0	0	0
10 October	0	0	0	2 Ammunition and Vehicle Storage Facilities, 1 Missile Storage Facility
11 October	6 Military Vehicles	0	0	0
12 October	1 Military Vehicle	0	0	0
13 October	4 Military Vehicles	0	1 Multiple Rocket Launcher	0
14 October	1 Military Vehicle	0	0	0
17 October	9 Military Vehicles	0	0	1 Command and Control Node
Total	30	2	7	35
