= Omer Shatz =

- Alma mater: Yale Law School
- Occupation: Human rights defender, lawyer

Omer Shatz is a French-Israeli human rights lawyer.

== Education ==
Shatz was born in 1980 or 1981 (age 45–46). He obtained a Master's degree in law at Yale Law School.

== Lawyer and academic ==
Shatz was a senior associate at Shearman & Sterling LLP in France.

As of December 2024, Shatz was a lecturer in international law at Sciences Po in Paris. Shatz taught at the American University of Paris in 2025 and was appointed as a research at the Central European University Law Clinic Project for 2023–2026.

== Prediction of Gaza genocide ==
In 2010, during a case against Yoav Gallant in the Supreme Court of Israel, Shatz and his legal colleagues stated a prediction to the judges, "We know you will reject this case, but if you don't intervene, one day, in 10 years or so, this will reach the Hague". Shatz himself predicted, "You will see, in ten years, there'll be a genocide" ("French: Vous verrez, dans dix ans, il y aura un génocide).

== Human rights advocacy ==
Shatz co-founded a non-governmental organization providing pro bono legal representation for asylum seekers, "We Are Refugees".

On 6 December 2024, Shatz submitted a 170-page document to the International Criminal Court investigation in Palestine against seven Israeli officials and an Israeli journalist, on behalf of an unnamed victim, stating that the eight officials had "publicly and directly incited others to commit genocide against the Palestinians of Gaza". The officials accused by Shatz were Benjamin Netanyahu, Yoav Gallant, Isaac Herzog, Israel Katz, Giora Eiland, Bezalel Smotrich, Itamar Ben-Gvir and Zvi Yehezkeli. The legal case was based on public statements by the accused, alleging that there was a systematic pattern of dehumanization and incitement to commit genocide against Gazans. According to Shatz's team, there were "decades of racist and dehumanizing rhetoric" by Ben-Gvir and Smotrich.

Incitement to genocide is punishable even if genocide is not committed, so Shatz argued that he didn't need evidence of the genocide itself. He stated that, since incitement precedes genocide itself, it was part of the intentions in the drafting of the Rome Statute to allow incitement to commit genocide to be prosecuted without evidence of the genocide itself having occurred – in order to reduce the risk of genocide or the genocide's intensity.

As of January 2025, Shatz is the legal director of Front Lex, an organization defending migrants' rights.

In October 2025, following an earlier 2019 submission to the International Criminal Court (ICC) investigation in Libya, Shatz, Juan Branco and colleagues submitted a 700-page request to the ICC to prosecute 122 named European officials for crimes against humanity for "migration policies [that the lawyers] argued led to the interception, detention, torture, killing and drowning of tens of thousands of people".

== Personal life ==
Shatz lived in Israel until 2014.
