= Jeune République =

French academic think tank

Jeune République was a French academic think tank affiliated officially affiliated to the Ecole normale supérieure and SciencesPo, which was active from 2009 to 2015.

Created in France by Juan Branco with the support of Stanley Hoffmann, Souleymane Bachir Diagne, Jean-Luc Mélenchon, Yves Bonnefoy, Dominique de Villepin, Alain Lipietz, Bertrand Badie, Salomé Zourabichvili and Christian Paul, Jeune République developed antennas at Harvard, UCSD, Berkeley, Oxford and Cambridge.

It created the René Cassin award, given to Baltasar Garzón in 2010, the day after his suspension as a judge in Spain. The award, given with the support of the International Criminal Court and Amnesty International, permitted his nomination as an advisor to the Prosecutor of the ICC.

Jeune République has organized conferences and symposiums from 2009 to 2014 in France and in universities abroad, triggering dialogues between the poets Yves Bonnefoy and Tahar Bekri, debates on the Afghan Wars between French Presidential candidates Dominique de Villepin and Jean-Luc Mélenchon and symposiums on mass surveillance and copyright issues with Noam Chomsky, Julian Assange and others.

The magazine mixed students’ and reputable experts’ contributions and was published online every three months and annually on paper. Its issues remain freely downloadable.
