= Legion Thoria =

Legion Thoria Elejan El-Thoria
- Active: Unknown – 2011
- Country: Libyan Arab Jamahiriya
- Allegiance: Muammar Gaddafi
- Branch: Mukhabarat el-Jamahiriya
- Size: Less than 600
- Garrison/HQ: Bani Walid
- Engagements: Libyan civil war: Battle of Bani Walid

The Legion Thoria, also known as the Elejan El-Thoria, were reported to be an element of Muammar Gaddafi's secret police.

In September 2011, in the Battle of Bani Walid during the Libyan Civil War, members of the Legion Thoria were reported to be part of the pro-Gaddafi defending force in the Battle of Bani Walid.
