= 2012 Bani Walid uprising =

Violent incident in Libya

- Part of the Factional violence in Libya (2011–2014)
Date	23–25 January 2012 (2 days)
Location	Bani Walid, Libya
Result	Brigade 93 Tactical victory: Brigade 93 takes control of the city; May 28 Brigade withdraws from the city to Tripoli; NTC local council abolished and Warfalla tribal council established, which is then recognized by the NTC as the new official city council; Continuing lawlessness leads to the Siege of Bani Walid (2012) by the NTC Army and the city being reoccupied by the government by November 2012.

Belligerents
National Liberation Army: May 28 Brigade	(Libya) Brigade 93: Warfalla tribe

Commanders and leaders
Abdullah al-Khazmi Ali al-Fotmani; Abdelsalem Saed Ouhida †	Col. Salem al-Ouaer

Strength
5,000~	100–300 Warfalla aligned fighters

Casualties and losses
5–8 killed, 25–30 wounded	None

The 2012 Bani Walid uprising was an event which started on 23 January 2012 due to an incident in the city of Bani Walid in which the "May 28 Brigade" militia wished to arrest local men in unclear circumstances. The May 28 Brigade and their compound were then attacked by local fighters who then took control of the town. The incident, the combatants, and the motives of the two main belligerents — the May 28 Brigade and Brigade 93 — remain uncertain and contentious. The conflict was originally reported to be an attack by Gaddafi loyalists by local NTC officials. However, tribal leaders and residents have denied any affiliation with Gaddafi's remnants, stating their goal was the establishment of their own council in the city. Similarly Britain's Foreign Office has dismissed claims of this incident representing a pro-Gaddafi attack against the NTC, stating that this was a dispute between tribal leaders of the Warfalla tribe and the NTC.

The Libyan government subsequently engaged in negotiations to re-establish normal relations with Bani Walid while maintaining a siege on the town, including a presidential visit to the town. Walid Ben Shaaban, a Libyan militia leader has stated "we will take revenge militarily but legitimately", referring to the security issues emanating from Bani Walid. In October, more troops were sent to Bani Walid, with an aim of re-establishing control of the city by military means. Intense shelling of the town started on 18 October.

== Background ==
Bani Walid was one of the last cities to fall into the hands of the rebel army who overthrew Muammar Gaddafi. As a former Gaddafi loyalist stronghold, an insurgency against new rulers developed in the city. After months of tensions in the city, a group of anti-NTC fighters attacked the main NTC base in Bani Walid.

== Uprising ==
=== 23 January attack ===
After distributing pro-Gaddafi papers the previous day, a group of 100-150 soldiers carrying the green flag of the Gaddafi government attacked the main NTC base of the city, killing four NTC soldiers; wounding 20 others and trapping the others in their base, according to Mahmud Warfelli, the spokesman of the NTC's council for Bani Walid, who called for help and feared a massacre as the NTC compound was besieged from all sides by the pro-Gaddafi fighters.

Witnesses told Reuters that the fighting had stopped and that pro-Gaddafi fighters were in control of the city, raising green flags and roaming in the center of the town.

The attack happened after a militia loyal to the National Transitional Council arrested armed pro-Gaddafi fighters.

In response to the attack, armored units of NTC fighters were deployed from Misrata, tasked with cutting off all routes out of the city. NTC forces were also preparing to conduct air sorties over the city, according to a Libyan Air Force official.

Several NTC officials have offered conflicting reports in regards to the attack. Anes Elsharif, a former military council spokesman, said that pro-Gaddafi fighters had stormed the NTC base but they did not control the city. Libyan defence minister, Osama al-Juwaily, said that while fighting has taken place, he could not confirm that Gaddafi loyalists were involved in the clashes.

However, Mohamed Bashir, mayor of Bani Walid, stated that Gaddafi loyalists have seized control of the city and that NTC fighters involved in the fighting were forced to retreat. He reported that at least 20 to 25 unidentified fighters were killed in the fighting.

=== 24 January ===
On 24 January, local elders denied reports that they were loyal to Gaddafi and Reuters reporters in Bani Walid saw no signs of the Gaddafi-era green flags which witnesses earlier said had been hoisted over the town.

A meeting of 200 elders abolished the NTC council in the city after local fighters routed NTC militia out of the town. They said that they will appoint their own government without NTC interference, but denied that they were supporting the Gaddafi government.

Conflicting reports continued to come on 24 January as Al Jazeera reporter Stefanie Dekker, based on the outskirts of the town, said that pro-Gaddafi fighters took over the city on 23 January and were still in control of the town, with soldiers from other towns massing themselves on Bani Walid outskirts. The local head of the NTC council Mubarak Al Fotmani, who has been involved in the clash the previous day, flew to Misrata where he repeated his version that hundreds of pro-Gaddafi took over the city.

The local NTC military leader Abdullah al-Khazmi said that the May 28 brigade was the only link between Bani Walid and the new authorities. He added that the brigade only had a superficial control over the town in the previous month and estimated that 99% of Bani Walid were pro-Gaddafi. He also said that Gaddafi loyalists were branded under the Brigade 93 name and that they had been responsible for the deaths of 13 NTC fighters in December. The Associated Press also confirmed that NTC reinforcements from Benghazi were massing on the outskirts of Bani Walid.

Libya interior minister said that they will strike back if Gaddafi loyalists were behind the Bani Walid events. The previous day, he dismissed the claims of a pro-Gaddafi attack and said it was a local problem.

Local tribal leader Colonel Ouer stated that they were in contact with Mustafa Abdul Jalil and were meeting with representatives of the nearby towns of Zintan and Sabratha.

Locals elders said that the events started when the May 28 Brigade arrested a Bani Walid resident and tortured him. They accused the May 28 Brigade of becoming an oppressor in the city. The elders also said that they were not Gaddafi loyalists and that they had only local motivation. A Reuters journalist touring the city saw no green flags, but a few new Libyan flags instead, even though some pro-Gaddafi graffiti was visible on the walls of the city.

The NTC jets were heard over the city, and NTC soldiers took up positions 50 km away from Bani Walid but had not received orders to move on the city.

=== 25 January ===
Libya's Defence Minister Osama al-Juwaily arrived in Bani Walid to hold talks with the town's new council to find a solution while NTC soldiers set up checkpoints in the surrounding region.

Later in the day Libya's defense Minister recognized the newly formed local tribal council, which overthrew the local NTC council, as the new authority of Bani Walid.

=== Cease-fire ===
On 26 January, the ousted militia continued to camp 30 km away from Bani Walid, and mixed together with fighters from other cities. They repeated that Bani Walid was under pro-Gaddafi control and estimated at 300 their numbers. They also claimed that dozens of pro-Gaddafi who were held at their base were freed in the uprising and threatened to launch an assault in the city if they are not allowed back in and if the former prisoners were not handed to them. Units of the national army stayed away from the militias and were manning a few checkpoints elsewhere in the desert.

Residents asked by AFP said privately that they were nostalgic of Gaddafi era, one of them saying that Gaddafi was living in the heart of Bani Walid people. They also said that they were resigned to the change in the country and that the uprising was only local. A resident told that the person arrested by the May 28 Brigade, an event which started the uprising, may have been a former pro-Gaddafi fighter. The resentment toward former rebels seems widespread in Bani Walid, with accusation of theft, arbitrary arrests and other abuses issued by the local population.

The new council of Bani Walid decided that May 28 brigade members could return to the city only individually and without weapons.

On 27 January, a commander of the May 28 Brigade, Imbarak al-Futmani told Reuters that they would retake Bani Walid and that they were only waiting for the green light from the prime minister. The militia assembled with other militia and regrouped 800 fighters. He also claimed that insurgents, which ousted them from Bani Walid, are pro-Gaddafi and that they seized tanks when they took over the May 28 Brigade base.

On 28 January, dozens of upset protesters gathered in front of the Prime minister offices to protest against the tour that the defense minister Juwaily made in Bani Walid earlier in the week. They accused him of siding with Gaddafi loyalists. An anti-Gaddafi doctor who had origins from Bani Walid said that the minister shook hands with well-known Gaddafi loyalists during his meetings in the city.

As of 14 February, the tribal council was still directing the city.

On 26 February, it was reported that Gaddafi loyalists were using Bani Walid as a safe haven and NTC chairman Jalil said that forces would be used if the city did not hand them.

Al Jazeera reported that pro-Gaddafi elements were in control of the city. Some families that supported the Libyan rebellion fled the city for Tripoli alongside the official militia.

German news outlet Qantara.de visited the city in April 2012 and reported that while many residents were resentful of the NTC due to the heavy damage anti-Gaddafi forces and looters among the militias inflicted during and immediately after the civil war, no Gaddafi-era green flags were visible in the city, while a handful of Libyan tricolours were in evidence. As of the time of publication on 27 April 2012, the NTC had still not formally recognised the Bani Walid Council of Elders' legitimacy as the local government despite the Council of Elders' edict handing over security in Bani Walid to the police and army. Many Libyans elsewhere in the country still view Bani Walid as a "Gaddafi city" owing to its late resistance during the war, according to the report. However, other reports from September 2012 stated that pictures of Gaddafi are being shown in public during weddings and youths play his speeches. Furthermore, school students refrain from singing the new national anthem, and teachers refused the revised curriculum.

Fighting erupted outside Bani Walid on 12 May and 2 fighters from the Misrata Libyan Shield Brigade, stationed between Tarouna and Bani Walid, were killed by local fighters. Bani Walid fighters were also suspected of having arrested 4 members of the Zliten council and one member of the former NTC council of Bani Walid who fled to Tripoli.

On 7 July, Bani Walid voted in the national poll, but government officials were denied access to the town and were unable to control the voting process.

On 11 September, interim president Mohammed el-Megarif visited Bani Walid in an attempt to reintegrate the city to the rest of the country.

== October siege ==
On 2 October, forces from Bani Walid engaged government forces in the Mordum area, resulting in one fatality.

Following a buildup of several thousand government forces around Bani Walid, fighting renewed on 8 October in the Mordum area, some 30 km south of one of the front lines at Bir Dufan. The fighting resulted in several injuries but no fatalities.

Of the injuries reported on 8 October, 26 were of patients admitted to Bani Walid hospital with a range of symptoms that led local doctors to accuse the Libyan Army of using gas against Bani Walid. The Libyan military and political leadership have both denied the use of gas, and it has been suggested that the gas was released from storage buildings within Bani Walid after having been hit by Libyan Army shells, or also that it was caused by some form of corrosion.

On 16 October, further fighting was reported from Bani Walid on three of the fronts surrounding the town, as opposed to previous fighting which was confined to the Mordum area. The brigades involved in the initial fighting were from Misrata, Mizda, and Gharyan. As with previous fighting however, the fighting had not been authorised by the Yousef Mangoush, the Armed Forces Chief of Staff. Despite lacking authorisation from Libya's political and military leadership, the fighting led to an escalating series of skirmishes between both sides, with 11 dead and 94 wounded being reported early on 18 October.

This led to Libyan Army units being ordered to enforce GNC Resolution No.7, which calls for the arrest of those responsible for the death of Omran Shaban and suspected of ties to the former regime, launching a full-scale attack on the town on the night of 18 October. According to army spokesman Mohammed al-Gandus, some 2,000 government forces being involved in the offensive. The actual status of the town however has been in dispute, with the army claiming it was close to the center of Bani Walid and in control of the airport, whereas a local Bani Walid resident has insisted that Libyan Army units had failed to enter the city.

National Congress leader Mohammed Magarief announced on 19 October that not all areas of Libya had been "fully liberated" on the eve of the first anniversary of the capture and death of deposed dictator Muammar Gaddafi. Speaking on national television, Magarief singles out Bani Walid, saying it had become "a safe haven for a large number of those who are outside of the law." On 20 October, authorities in Tripoli announced the capture of Gaddafi's former spokesman Moussa Ibrahim near the town of Tarhouna, south of the capital. Ibrahim's whereabouts had been unknown since the end of the war in 2011 and there had been several earlier reports of his arrest.
