= 1993 Libyan coup attempt =

1993 Libyan coup d'état attempt
- Native name: محاولة الانقلاب الليبي ۱۹۹۳
- Date: 22 October 1993
- Location: Misurata, Bani Walid, Tripoli (Socialist People's Libyan Arab Jamahiriya)
- Type: Military coup
- Motive: Ousting of Muammar el-Qaddafi
- Target: Muammar Qaddafi
- Organised by: Khalifa Haftar
- Participants: Members of the Warfalla tribe, members of Libyan Army
- Outcome: Coup fail: Executions of coup affiliates; Mass executions of elements from the Libyan army.; Decline of Warfalla and Misurata influence in Libyan Political system

The 1993 coup d'état was a failed military coup initiated by the Warfalla senior military officers against Libyan leader Muammar el-Qaddafi on 22 October 1993. The coup was led by Khalifa Haftar, a leading senior officer in the Libyan Armed Forces who later defected during the coup. The result was the execution of many senior officers and the installment of loyal members.

== Background ==
Libyan leader Qaddafi was widely regarded as a dictator and believed in Pan-Arab Nationalism as well as Pan-African Nationalism. Since securing power in 1969, Qaddafi had worked to fill senior positions in his government and security services with members of his own tribe, the Gaddafa in order to deter a coup d'état. The coup attempt occurred the year following the imposition of a significantly impactful sanctions regime on Libya under United Nations Security Council Resolution 748 which caused significant economic hardship and sparked internal unrest as a result.

== Coup ==
On 22 October, soldiers who opposed the Jamahiriya started mobilising for a coup and started forming protests and rebellions against Qaddafi. Rebellions erupted in Misurata and Bani Walid where the rebellion tried to overthrow Qaddafi in Tripoli, which failed. Exiled groups like the National Front for the Salvation of Libya stated that they would attack Qaddafi with their 2,000 troops still stationed in Libya. The CIA was reportedly involved in the coup. The rebellion in Bani Walid was violent according to reports. Khalifa Hunaysh, commander of Gaddafi's "presidential guards," played a leading role in crushing the coup in Bani Walid. Later, that day, the Libyan Air Force thwarted advances by the coup members and was later crushed.

== Aftermath ==
Many Warfalla tribe members were executed and Khalifa Haftar was exiled to Chad. Qaddafi later started removing suspicious officers and replacing them with loyal ones as well as enlarging the army.

Many critics said that 'no one' won except Qaddafi.
