= Bani Walid Airport =

- IATA: none; ICAO: HLWD

Summary
- Airport type: Public
- Serves: Bani Walid
- Elevation AMSL: 300 m / 985 ft
- Coordinates: 31°44′27″N 13°57′13″E

Map
- Location of the airport in Libya

Runways
Direction	Length		Surface
Direction	m	ft	Surface
18/36	1,800	5,906	Asphalt
- Source: Google Maps SkyVector

Bani Walid Airport (ICAO: HLWD) is an airport serving the city of Bani Walid in Libya. The airport is at the western edge of the city.

The Beni Walid VOR-DME (ident: WLD) is 7.1 kilometres (4.4 mi) northeast of the airport. The Beni Walid Non-directional beacon (ident: WLD) is 6 kilometres (3.7 mi) east of the airport.

Google Earth Historical Imagery (1/29/2016) shows an additional 550 metres (1,800 ft) asphalt runway extension to the south, with base layer laid down for a possible 1,200 metres (3,900 ft) total extension.

== See also ==
- Transport in Libya
- List of airports in Libya
