= Khaled Mohamed Ali El Hishri =

Libyan alleged war criminal

- Born: Zawiya, Libya
- Occupation: Former security official
- Office: Official in the Deterrence Apparatus for Combating Terrorism and Organized Crime (formerly)
- Criminal charges: War crimes, Crimes against humanity
- Criminal status: In custody of the International Criminal Court

Khaled Mohamed Ali El Hishri (arabic: خالد محمد علي الهيشري) is a Libyan former security official and suspected war criminal, who held a leadership position in the "Special Deterrence Force - Al Radaa (arabic: قوات الردع الخاصة)" in Tripoli. He was associated with the administration of Mitiga prison and gained international notoriety after the International Criminal Court (ICC) issued an arrest warrant against him on charges of war crimes and crimes against humanity.

== Criminal charges ==
The International Criminal Court accuses El Hishri of criminal responsibility for crimes committed between 2015 and 2020 inside the Mitiga prison in Tripoli. According to the ICC Prosecutor, El Hishri was a senior official at the prison and is suspected of involvement, either directly or by issuing orders, in crimes including:

- Murder.
- Torture.
- Sexual violence and rape.
- Rape of underage children.
- Unlawful detention.

== Arrest and prosecution ==
On July 10, 2025, Pre-Trial Chamber I of the International Criminal Court issued a secret arrest warrant for El Hishri.

On July 16, 2025, German authorities arrested him in Germany based on the international arrest warrant. El Hishri remained in custody with the German authorities to complete local legal procedures regarding his extradition.

On December 1, 2025, the International Criminal Court officially announced the transfer of El Hishri to its detention center in The Hague, in preparation for his appearance before the court and the start of his trial proceedings.

== See also ==
- International Criminal Court
- Second Libyan Civil War
- Human rights in Libya
