= Gaddafi loyalism =

Sympathetic sentiment towards the overthrown government of Muammar Gaddafi

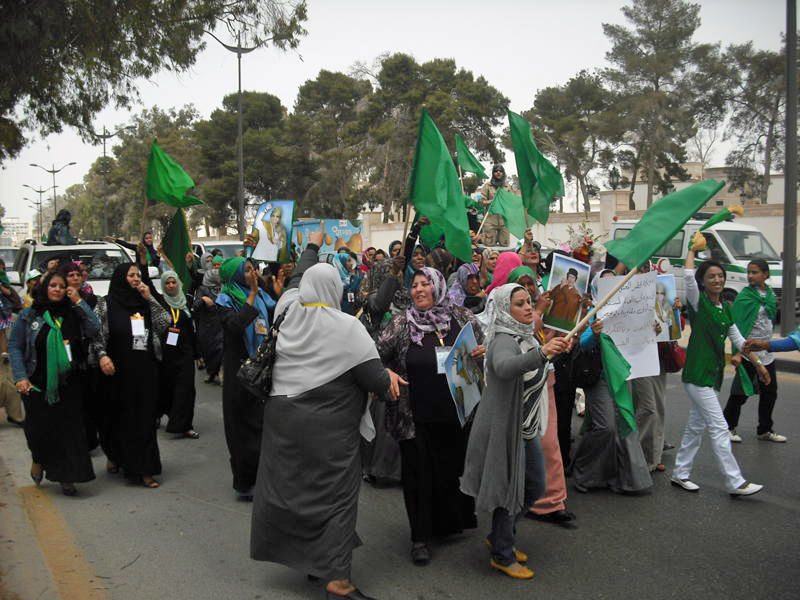
Libyan women chanting slogans in support of the regime in Tripoli in 2011, before the fall of Gaddafi.

Gaddafi loyalism, also known as the Green resistance, consists of sympathetic sentiment towards the overthrown leader of Libya, Muammar Gaddafi, who was killed extrajudicially in October 2011, and his Third International Theory. Despite Muammar Gaddafi's death, his legacy and Jamahiriya ideology still maintains a popular appeal both inside and outside Libya into the present day.

Sympathy for Gaddafi and his fallen government is viewed rather negatively by current Libyan authorities—both the legal government and extralegal militias— and even accusations of it can provoke harsh responses. In May 2012, the postwar government passed legislation imposing severe penalties for anyone giving favourable publicity to Gaddafi, his family, their regime or ideas, as well as anything denigrating the new government and its institutions or otherwise judged to be damaging to public morale. Derisively called tahloob ("algae") by anti-Gaddafi Libyans, suspected loyalists have faced strong persecution following the war. Around 7,000 loyalist soldiers, as well as civilians accused of support for Gaddafi are being held in government prisons. Amnesty International has reported large scale torture and other mistreatment and executions, of those perceived as enemies of the new government.

Reports and rumours of organised pro-Gaddafi activity have persisted since the war's end. The Libyan Popular National Movement was organised in exile on 15 February 2012 (the first anniversary of the protests that led to the civil war) by former officials in the Gaddafi government. The party, banned from participating in Libyan elections, may have also cultivated links with armed pro-Gaddafi groups in Libya. Statements from the party sometimes appear on websites affiliated with the so-called "Green Resistance" (after the sole colour of Gaddafi's flag), a term sometimes used by sympathisers to refer to supposed pro-Gaddafi militant groups.

Bani Walid, Ghat, Al Ajaylat, Brak, and Sirte are cities with large amounts of Gaddafi loyalism present. However, by the time he was killed in February 2026, Gaddafi's son Saif al-Islam Gaddafi was described as the only person who could unite Gaddafi loyalists following his father's downfall.

== Ideology ==
The ideology of Gaddafi Loyalism follows the ideology of Muammar Gaddafi and Third International Theory. Third International Theory is a left-wing political movement which has elements of Arab nationalism, Nasserism, anti-imperialism, socialism, pan-Arabism, and principles of direct democracy.

== History ==
=== 2011 ===
==== End of the civil war ====
Following Gaddafi's fall, several states, such as Venezuela, refused to accept the National Transitional Council as the legitimate government, opting to continue recognising the former Gaddafi government. In Libya, loyalists either fled to foreign countries or went into hiding to avoid prosecutions. Shortly before his capture, Gaddafi's son Saif al-Islam appeared on Syrian pro-Gaddafi television on 22 October in an attempt to rally remaining loyalists claiming "I am in Libya, I am alive and free and willing to fight to the end and take revenge."

==== Zawiya fighting ====
Several days of fighting between fighters from Zawiya and fighters from Warshefana erupted in early November after the fighters from Warshefana set up a checkpoint on a highway near Zawiya and began challenging fighters from the city. Other reports stated that the groups were fighting over the Imaya military base, with Zawiya fighters claiming to be fighting Gaddafi loyalists. Zawiya field commander Walid bin Kora claimed that the Warshefana, riding in vehicles with "Brigade of the Martyr Muhammad Gaddafi" written on them and flying Gaddafi's green flag, had attacked his men. He also claimed that his men captured pro-Gaddafi "mercenaries" from sub-Saharan Africa. NTC figures, however, denied that they were Gaddafi loyalists, blaming the clashes instead on a misunderstanding. The fighting resulted in between 7 and 14 dead. The National Transitional Council claimed to have resolved the issue over the weekend of the 12 and 13 November following a meeting with elders from Zawiya and Warshefana.

==== Capture of Saif al-Islam Gaddafi ====
On 19 November, Saif al-Islam and four loyalist fighters were captured west of the town of Ubari near Sabha in southern Libya. A nomad who had been hired to guide them in their planned escape to Niger secretly told government forces where Saif al-Islam and his two-vehicle convoy would be passing through. Acting on this information, the Zintan brigade blocked off the area and arrested them on sight. Saif al-Islam was taken to Zintan by plane and, pending trial, he is kept in detention by the Zintan militia.

==== Bani Walid ambush ====
On 23 November, clashes erupted as a National Transitional Council militia tried to apprehend a suspected loyalist in Bani Walid, which was one of the last pro-Gaddafi strongholds in the civil war. At least seven people were reported killed, five of them NTC militia.

=== 2012 ===
==== Sirte ====
In January 2012, residents of Sirte, Gaddafi's hometown, attacked a military camp associated with the NTC on the outskirts of the city.

==== Zuwara clashes ====
On 1 April, between 21 and 34 Zuwara militiamen were detained by members of a neighbouring town's militia. Fighters from Ragdalein stated that they captured the men after months of abuses by a Zuwara brigade, including the looting of property. For their part, the Zuwara local council head accused Ragdalein of being a hub of Gaddafi loyalists. A third version of the events came from the government Interior Ministry which stated that the trouble started when a Zuwara hunting party close to nearby al-Jumail shot and killed a person from that town by mistake. The hunters were then arrested but released later. Another Zuwara council head claimed that the men were tortured before being released and stated that Zuwara came under mortar and anti-aircraft fire by militias from both Ragdalein and al-Jumail.

On 3 April, reports emerged that the fighting in the Zuwara area was still continuing with at least one Zuwara militiaman killed and five wounded. The losses for militia from Ragdalein and al-Jumail were not known. Clashes were reported at the entrance to Ragdalein while groups in al-Jumail were shelling Zuwara. At least 14 were killed and 80 injured.

On 4 April, the fighting escalated with the use of tanks and artillery. The reported number of dead was said to have risen to 26, eight from Zuwarah and 18 from the outlying towns, and another 142 Zuwarans were wounded. Unconfirmed reports rose up the death toll to 48 killed in the clashes. BBC News aired a report on the story, confirming a number dead. The report also aired an interview with a wounded man from Zarawa, claiming to have been attacked by what he called "Gaddafi loyalists". There is no confirmation as to whether or not the clashes had anything to do with the guerrillas.

==== Ghat skirmishes ====
On 6 April, French leading newspaper Le Figaro reported that a dozen people were killed near the border town of Ghat on 1 and 2 April in fighting between former pro-Gaddafi Tuaregs and the Zintan tribe.

The town of Ghat, in the deserts of southwest Libya, was a stronghold of Gaddafi during his reign. It was the last town in Libya to recognise the new government. Since the fall of Gaddafi, it has been suspected of continuing to be a base of loyalist sentiment. No area in Libya has had as many officials disbarred due to links to the Gaddafi government. The present government has banned its two council members, the local council leader, the secretary to the council, its financial controller, the head of security services, and the heads of the sanitation department and the border guards.

==== Zintan clashes ====
Tribal clashes in Zintan broke out on 17 June, after a Zintan man was killed after stopping at a checkpoint while attempting to transport tanks from a weapons depot in Mizda to Zintan. While the Zintanis had played a prominent role fighting in favour of the NTC during the civil war, the neighbouring Mashashya tribe had chosen to side with the Gaddafi government during the civil war.

The Mashashya tribe chose to side with the Gaddafi government, whilst fighters from Zintan played a prominent role, fighting in favour of the NTC. This, combined with a dispute over land and bitterness over prisoners of war from Mashashya, led to the fighting. It is unclear if Green Resistance had a role in instigating the violence.

As a result of the fierce fighting between the different tribes, government troops were deployed to the area on 17 June. The area was subsequently declared a military zone. The deployment of soldiers and imposition of a government enforced ceasefire managed to prevent further clashes, with government spokesman Nasser al-Manaa declaring that fighting had ended on 18 June.

==== Tripoli ====
In August 2012, claims surfaced of loyalist remnants attempting to smuggle weapons into Libya in an effort to destabilise the government. A member of the group in Tripoli's Abu Salim neighbourhood, a former pro-Gaddafi stronghold, claimed in an August 2012 interview that loyalist militia were rebuilding their strength and waiting for the right moment to move against the new government. Saadi Gaddafi was claimed to support the group whilst under house arrest in Niger. He warned in early 2012 that he was in contact with sleeper cells who were organising underground resistance. In addition to his son Saadi, Muammar Gaddafi's nephew Ahmad Gaddaf al-Damm, living in hiding in Egypt, was also accused of supporting violent pro-Gaddafi activity. Col. Khamid Bilhayr of the Libyan National Army claimed that other loyalist figures outside the country were sending large quantities of money and support to loyalist groups inside Libya.

Others claim that despite the group's rhetoric, its operations were limited to bombings and minor instances of sabotage. They were believed to have been behind a bombing outside the headquarters of the Military Police on 10 August. On 19 August, two people were killed and up to five were injured when a car bomb went off at dawn near the former military academy for women. Another car bomb exploded at the same time near the interior ministry, but no one was harmed. The bombings occurred on the eve of the anniversary of the Battle of Tripoli. Tripoli's head of security, Col. Mahmoud Sherif, blamed Gaddafi loyalists for the attack, and the following day Libyan authorities announced they had arrested 32 members of a pro-Gaddafi network in connection with the bombings.

On the same day as the arrests, a bomb was placed under the car of an Egyptian diplomat. The bomb exploded, but nobody was injured. The incident was also blamed by the government on Gaddafi loyalists.

==== Raid on Katibat Al-Awfiyah brigade ====
On 23 August, Interior ministry spokesman Abdelmonem al-Hur claimed that more than a hundred tanks and twenty-six rocket launchers were seized from an alleged pro-Gaddafi militia (named Katibat Al-Awfiyah, or Brigade of the Faithful), during a government raid on their campsite in Tarhuna. The operation ended with one of the fighters killed, eight wounded and thirteen detained—including the commander—and accused of being linked with 19 August Tripoli bombings. Three fighters managed to escape.

==== Death of Omran Shaban ====
Omran Shaban, the man held most responsible for the extrajudicial killing of Gaddafi, was abducted by suspected Gaddafi loyalists in Bani Walid in July. He was imprisoned and tortured for two months before being released in September due to government pressure on Bani Walid. He was sent to France for medical treatment, but died of his wounds the same month. The rebels responsible have eluded capture or death.

==== Bani Walid ====
On 9 September, local militia in Bani Walid drove government forces from the town. Initial reports claimed that a supposed Gaddafi loyalist group called "Brigade 93" was responsible for the takeover, although the Bani Walid town elders later denied this, and proclaimed support for the removal of Gaddafi. The elders stated that the accusations of pro-Gaddafi sympathies were orchestrated by the media, and that the town instead was fighting for the removal of the NTC military administration of the town and its replacement by a local council.

==== Brak ambush ====
On 21 September, government forces were ambushed by Gaddafi loyalists in the city of Brak in south west Libya. Nine soldiers were killed in the attack, with no information of casualties from the attackers.

=== 2014 ===
On 18 January, the Libyan air force attacked targets in the south of Libya because of unrest blamed on forces loyal to slain leader Muammar Gaddafi. The government also declared a state of emergency after Gaddafi loyalists took over the Tamahind air force base near the southern city of Sabha. On 22 January Voice of Russia featured a report with Libyans who claimed that much of the southern half of the country as well as Bani Walid had fallen under the control of the "Green" Gaddafi loyalists, and that some foreign Libyan embassies were flying the Gaddafi-era green flag in support. The interviewed Libyans claimed to be fighting against a Western-backed "puppet government" with ties to Al-Qaeda, and charged that Qatar was paying Sudanese pilots to bomb their positions. On the other hand, the more government-friendly Libya Herald newspaper reported that a large contingent of Gaddafi-friendly fighters were scattered near Ajilat as they tried to aid other Gaddafi-loyalists in Sabha, with five of them killed. The report claimed that if the events were part of a coordinated movement, "it does not appear to be well organised, let alone have any significant or measurable support."

On 22 January, the Libyan General National Congress passed Decree 5/2014, Concerning the Cessation and Ban on the Broadcasting of Certain Satellite Channels, aimed at censoring pro-Gaddafi satellite television stations such as al-Khadra (The Green Channel) and al-Nedaa (the Libyan Popular National Movement's channel). Reporters Without Borders subsequently issued a statement calling for the withdrawal of the decree.

On 24 January, nine soldiers were killed and 27 injured near Tripoli in clashes with Gaddafi loyalists.

=== 2015 ===
On 4 August, dozens of Gaddafi loyalists staged a rare public demonstration in Benghazi (the only pro-Gaddafi gathering in the city as of yet), chanting pro-Gaddafi slogans and waving the flag of the Jamahiriya, in response to Saif al-Islam Gaddafi's death sentence. The protest was later dispersed after anti-Gaddafi militia opened fire and threw rocks, although no one was reported injured. Continuous fighting was also alleged to have erupted between pockets of pro-Gaddafi militants and ISIL forces in Gaddafi's former hometown of Sirte. Furthermore, protests were reported across the Libyan south, in particular the city of Sabha, where at least four protestors were reported dead after opponents opened fire. Protests were also reported in Tobruk, triggering a large counter-demonstration from those in favour of the 2011 revolution. Another protest happened on 7 August in Bani Walid, a city that was a stronghold of pro-Gaddafi loyalists.

=== 2016 ===
On 5 May, Gaddafi loyalists along with soldiers loyal to Khalifa Haftar captured the town of Zella after an intense battle with Islamic State of Iraq and the Levant in Libya fighters near Sirte. Some loyalists joined the Battle of Sirte on the side of the GNA. On 23 December, a Gaddafi loyalist hijacked a plane which was flying from Sabha to Tripoli and was diverted to Malta.

=== 2018 ===
Saif al-Islam Gaddafi, the son of Muammar Gaddafi, announced on 22 March 2018 that he will run for president of Libya, in the 2019 Libyan General Election.

On May 20, a delegation of Gaddafi exiled supporters comprising three former high-ranking military officials, three activists and a university professor that have being invited to a reconciliation meeting in Tripoli were detained on charges of planning violent acts to destabilize the capital.

On September 1, shy celebrations marking the 49th anniversary of Al Fateh Revolution spread over several cities including Sabha, Sirte, Benghazi and Tripoli suburbs.

On September 2, hundreds of prisoners, including Gaddafi supporters, escaped from Ain Zara prison in the southern suburbs of Tripoli, in a mass jail break during clashes in the city between the Tripoli Revolutionaries Brigade and Nawasi Brigade against the 7th Brigade from Tarhuna.

=== 2020 ===
On August 20, dozens of Gaddafi supporters held demonstrations in Sirte, Bani Walid and Ghat.

On August 24, supporters of the Gaddafi family once again gathered in Sirte, with reports of clashes between the LNA and the protestors. 50 civilians had been detained since the start of the demonstrations in Sirte.

On September 1, Gaddafi supporters celebrated the 51st anniversary of the Al Fateh Revolution taking to the streets of several towns like Ajaylat, Tiji (Al-Sayan), Bani Walid and Sabha.

=== 2021 ===
On November 14, Saif al-Islam Gaddafi registered his candidacy for the next Libyan presidential election but was disqualified ten days later by the Libyan High National Election Commission. After a delayed appeal, Gaddafi's candidacy was reinstated by a court in Sabha on December 2. Gaddafi supporters were sighted celebrating throughout the city.

=== 2022 and 2023 ===
In 2022 and 2023, ahead of those years' celebrations for the Al Fateh Revolution, forces under the command of Khalifa Haftar began a campaign of arrests against Gaddafi supporters in Sirte. In 2023, the Tariq Ben Zeyad Brigade made arrests in the Buhadi area of the city.

Celebrations for the 54th anniversary of the Al Fateh Revolution occurred in a few cities in 2023. Most of celebrations were concentrated in southern cities like Traghan, as well as the city of Bani Walid in the North West.

=== 2026 ===
==== Death of Saif al-Islam Gaddafi ====
The assassination of Muammar Gaddafi's son, Saif al-Islam Gaddafi, has sparked mourning among his loyalists. Saif was deemed the heir apparent of his father. The Chatham House described Saif as "the only figure who could coalesce the ‘Green’ constituency" and that his death resulted in "the end of a political era in Libya," with Gaddafi loyalists now not having someone who could unite them. The Robert Lansing Institute also stated that his death removed "a rallying figure for a “third force” / pro-Gaddafi current" and "a symbolic “unifying” claimant for Gaddafi-era loyalists," though there was still the possibly that his killing could "radicalize parts of that constituency by turning him into a martyr—creating incentives for sabotage against any political roadmap.

== Opinions in Libya ==
Polling for the next Libyan presidential election with the participation of Gaddafi's son Saif al-Islam Gaddafi under the Popular Front for the Liberation of Libya had placed Gaddafi in second place, behind Abdul Hamid Dbeibeh. However, Saif was later killed in February 2026.

Poll source	Date(s) administered	Sample size (Note: Key: A – all adults RV – registered voters LV – likely voters V – unclear)	Margin of error	Dbeibeh	Gaddafi	Haftar	Bashagha	Undecided	Other
Diwan Institute	1–5 December 2021	1106 (RV)	± 3%	49.7%	14%	7.3%	1.5%	25.5%	2.1%

== Reception ==
=== Domestic ===
Mustafa Al-Zaidi is leader of the National Movement Party, which is a Gaddafi loyalist party in Libya.

Saif al-Islam Gaddafi was the leader of the Popular Front for the Liberation of Libya, a Gaddafi loyalist militia and political party that was founded in 2016.

=== Foreign ===
The Communist Party of Great Britain (Marxist–Leninist) openly supports the movement.

== See also ==
- Neo-Ba'athism
- Army of the Men of the Naqshbandi Order
