= 1976 Libyan protests =

Protests against human rights violations

- Date: 7 April 1976
- Location: Tripoli and Benghazi, Libya
- Caused by: Human rights violations; Military control over civilian life
- Goals: Free and fair elections; Power transfer to civilian government
- Result: Protesters imprisoned; Annual public executions

The 1976 Libyan protests were demonstrations organized by university students in Tripoli and Benghazi who protested against human rights violations and military control over the civilian population, calling for free and fair elections and for a civilian government. The protests were repressed and many students were imprisoned.

== Background ==
Muammar Gaddafi became the de facto leader of Libya on 1 September 1969 after leading a group of young Libyan Army officers against King Idris I in a bloodless coup d'état. After the king had fled the country, the Revolutionary Command Council (RCC) headed by Gaddafi abolished the monarchy and the old constitution and established the Libyan Arab Republic.

== Protests ==
During the transition to the Jamahiriya, on 7 April 1976, students of universities in Tripoli and Benghazi protested against human rights violations and the military’s control over "all aspects of life in Libya"; the students called for free and fair elections to take place and for power to be transferred to a civilian government. Violent counter-demonstrations took place, with many students imprisoned.

== Aftermath ==
On 7 April 1977, the anniversary of the event, students (including Omar Dabob and Muhammed Ben Saoud) were publicly executed in Benghazi, with anti-Gaddafi military officers executed later in the week. Friends of the executees were forced to participate in or observe the executions. Annual public executions would go on to continue each year, on 7 April, until the late 1980s.

== See also ==
- First Libyan Civil War
