= Juan Branco =

French-Spanish lawyer, writer and political activist

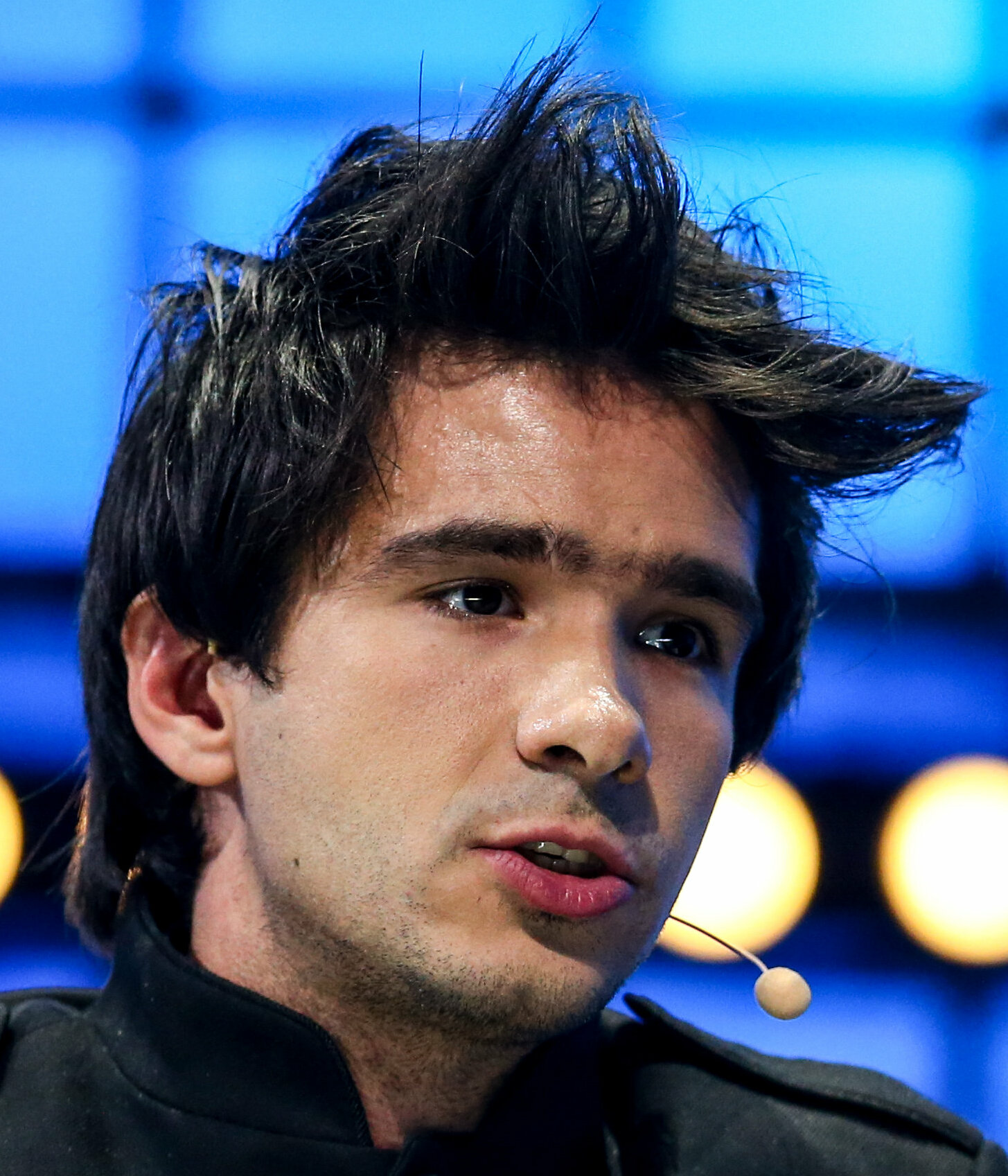
- Branco in 2019
- Born: 1989 (age 36–37); Estepona, Andalusia, Spain
- Education: École normale supérieure (Paris) (PhD); Sciences Po Paris; Paris Sorbonne University; Panthéon-Sorbonne University
- Occupations: Lawyer; political activist; writer
- Employer: WikiLeaks (2015–2019)
- Notable work: Crépuscule
- Political party: The Greens (France) (2008); Socialist Party (France) (2012); La France Insoumise (2017)
- Movement: Yellow Vests Movement (since 2018)
- Father: Paulo Branco
- Website: juan-branco.fr

Juan Branco (Spanish: [xwam ˈbɾaŋko], French: [ʒɥɑ̃ bʁɑ̃ko]; born 1989) is a French and Spanish lawyer, political activist, and writer.

Branco was born in Spain and grew up in Paris. While a student at the Paris Institute of Political Studies (Sciences Po), he stood for the Green Party in local elections. He then worked on the 2012 presidential election campaign of Socialist Party's candidate, François Hollande. After that, he completed his master's degrees followed by his PhD in 2014, and became a legal advisor of WikiLeaks and Julian Assange between 2015 and 2019. During this period, he also stood unsuccessfully in the 2017 French legislative election as a candidate for the left wing populist party La France Insoumise. In 2018 he became involved with the Yellow vests movement, some of whose members he defended in court pro bono.

Branco has published numerous books, the most successful of which is Crépuscule (2019). Selling more than 150,000 copies within a year of publication, the work is a polemic against the links that, according to the author, unite business, media and political leaders in France.

He has courted controversy for his involvement with the Russian performance artist Petr Pavlensky in the Griveaux affair in 2020.

In July 2023, as a member of the legal team of the Senegalese opposition leader Ousmane Sonko, he accused the Senegalese government of crimes against humanity at the International Criminal Court over the deadly 2023 Senegalese protests. In response, the Senegalese authorities issued an international arrest warrant against him; he was arrested in August 2023 after entering the country clandestinely and deported to France after spending two nights in prison.

== Background and education ==
Branco was born in 1989 in Estepona, near Málaga, one of the four children of psychoanalyst Dolores Lopez and Portuguese film producer Paulo Branco. He grew up in the affluent neighbourhood of Saint-Germain-des-Prés in the 6th arrondissement of Paris and attended the École alsacienne, an elite private school.

He studied as an undergraduate at the Paris Institute of Political Studies (Sciences Po) and as a graduate and PhD student at the École normale supérieure, and also at Paris-IV and Paris-I Universities; obtaining a "maîtrise" (Note: former French diploma, intermediate between bachelor's and master's.) in modern literature, a master's in political philosophy, another in geopolitics, and a doctorate in international law.

He went on to do research at Yale University in 2013 and wrote a dissertation on the International Criminal Court and mass violence, travelling to the Central African Republic during the civil war. He defended his thesis on 16 November 2014 at the École normale supérieure. He was then employed in 2015 at the Max Planck Institute in Luxembourg and at La Sapienza University in Rome.

== Political activity ==
As a student, Branco stood for the Green Party in the 2008 local elections in Paris. The following year, he set up the student think-tank Jeune République, with the support of former right-wing Prime Minister Dominique de Villepin.

In 2012, Branco joined François Hollande's Socialist Party presidential election campaign, working in the "culture, audiovisual and media" team as the main collaborator of future Culture Minister Aurélie Filippetti. He fell out with Filipetti when she did not appoint him as head of her office once she became minister; according to Branco, he was a victim of the Socialist government's new doctrine on the HADOPI law, an online anti-piracy law which he had opposed since 2009.

In the 2017 French legislative election, Branco stood for the left-wing populist party La France Insoumise for Seine-Saint-Denis's 12th constituency, where he came fourth with 13.94% of the vote.

He was an early supporter of Yellow vests movement, appearing at the head of protest marches and being present when protesters forced the doors of Benjamin Griveaux's ministry with a fork-lift truck. He also defended members of the movement, including Maxime Nicolle, in court pro bono. He then called for abstention in the 2019 European Parliament election in France.

On 19 December 2025, Branco announced on Radio Sud that he was standing as a candidate in the 2027 French presidential election.

== Legal career ==
Branco was admitted to the bar in April 2017.

Prior to being admitted to the bar, Branco had worked at the French Ministry of Foreign Affairs and at the International Criminal Court, an institution on which he wrote two books. He also worked as a legal advisor to WikiLeaks and Julian Assange between 2015 and 2019. He unsuccessfully sought asylum in France for Assange.

In 2018 he represented his father Paulo Branco in his legal dispute with Terry Gilliam over the film The Man Who Killed Don Quixote, with the Court of Appeal of Paris ruling in Branco's favour.

In May 2018, Branco was one of the lawyers appointed by the United Nations Multidimensional Integrated Stabilization Mission in the Central African Republic (MINUSCA) to assist the country's newly established special criminal court. After less than two weeks he was dismissed by the United Nations for having posted on Twitter an accusation that Rwandan peacekeepers had massacred thirty civilians in the capital.

In June 2019, together with Israeli lawyer Omer Shatz and Shatz's students from Sciences Po, Branco filed a 245-page submission to the International Criminal Court over the deaths of thousands of migrants who drowned in the Mediterranean fleeing Libya; they called for the prosecution of European Union and member states over the EU's deterrence-based migration policy after 2014.

In 2021, Branco represented one of the cyberbullies in the Mila affair, which was a case involving a teenager who was bullied online after she had insulted Islam.

Branco represented a French fan club of FC Barcelona in an unsuccessful attempt to block Lionel Messi's move to Paris St-Germain from a financial fair play standpoint in 2021. He then became La Liga's lawyer in 2022 when the league mounted a similar challenge to Kylian Mbappé's new contract with Paris Saint-Germain.

In April 2021, a 20-year-old woman accused Branco of raping her after having given her the drug lamaline. (Note: A medication containing paracetamol, opium and caffeine.) Branco said the sex was consensual. In June 2023 he was again questioned after two more woman came forward with similar allegations. Branco was then investigated by the Paris Bar for having published confidential details of the case on X. In October 2024, he was banned from practising for three years, of which 2 years 3 months were suspended. Branco appealed the ban, allowing him to practise pending a further hearing. The appeal was unsuccessful. In August 2026, the Paris prosecutor's office sought a referral to trial on charges of raping the 20-year-old woman, but not for the other allegations.

== Griveaux affair ==
Branco was the legal advisor of Russian performance artist Petr Pavlensky who, in February 2020, disseminated an explicit video that led to the resignation of French deputy and Paris mayoral candidate Benjamin Griveaux. Branco voiced his support for Pavlensky's actions in a way that caused speculation that he himself had played a role in the affair. Rejecting the advice of the French Bar Association to resign due to his proximity to the events in question, Branco continued as part of the defence team of Pavlensky when the latter was arrested on charges of invasion of privacy and publishing sexually explicit images without consent. Branco requested a psychiatric examination of the victim, which was characterised by Griveaux's lawyer as "grotesque and hateful", and refused by the court.

In September 2021, Branco received a reprimand from the Paris Bar Association for having sent a link to the offending video. In September 2022, investigating magistrates said that no charges would be brought against Branco although they believed that he had probably played a part in the dissemination of the explicit videos. In June 2023, the reprimand from the Paris Bar Association was overturned in the Paris Court of Appeal.

== Sonko affair ==
In March 2023, Branco was invited to join the defence team of Senegalese opposition leader Ousmane Sonko, who was facing charges of defamation after he had accused the tourism minister of mismanaging public funds. Ten days later, he was refused entry to the country after the authorities discovered he had referred to president Macky Sall as a "tyrant" in social media posts.

In June 2023, in the wake of unrest in Senegal, Branco accused the Senegalese government of crimes against humanity, filing a complaint in France and calling for an investigation by the International Criminal Court; in July the French Minister of Foreign Affairs responded by filing a complaint against Branco for having identified French agents in Senegal, accusing him of putting their lives in danger; the Prosecutor's Office decided not to pursue the matter.

Senegal meanwhile issued an international arrest warrant against Branco, which did not prevent him entering the country illegally to attend a press conference of Sonko's legal team on 30 July 2023. On 4 August, he was arrested on the border with Mauritania. Transferred to Rebeuss prison in Dakar, he appeared before a judge on 6 August and was charged with conspiracy, spreading fake news and endangering public safety. The following day he was released on bail with a deportation order and arrived back in Paris on 8 August. At a press conference on the same day, he urged Senegal's government to release all political prisoners. On 18 August, he was received at the Office of the United Nations High Commissioner for Human Rights, together with Said Larifou, to draw the UN's attention to Sonko's situation.

== Other controversies ==
While at school, Branco set up a Skyblog in which fellow pupils were subjected to sexist and homophobic insults. One of those who had been bullied on the blog was future education minister and prime minister Gabriel Attal, who spoke about the experience on TV in November 2023. Branco, who was not named in the interview, responded with a claim that it was Attal who was a bully. Branco had also attacked Attal in his book Crépuscule.

In October 2016 Branco offered his services as a lawyer to the terrorist Salah Abdeslam in a letter which was revealed by Valeurs Actuelles in February 2020. As he was not yet admitted to the bar and therefore not legally permitted to practice law, a number of lawyers characterised Branco's actions as illegal. Branco explained that in October 2016 he had already qualified as a lawyer and could have been admitted to the bar at any time. Abdeslam did not reply to the letter.

Branco has used multiple identities since 2005 to embellish his own biography on Wikipedia and to settle accounts with others. According to an article in L'Express, he sent an email in 2014 to the employer of another Wikipedia editor, in which he pretended to be a Wikipedia administrator and threatened them with legal action. Branco responded to the article with a denial, saying he had never attacked anyone on Wikipedia.

== Writing ==
Branco has written the following:

- Réponses à Hadopi (Paris, Capricci, 2011, ISBN 978-2918040255)
- De l'affaire Katanga au contrat social global: Un regard sur la Cour pénale internationale (thesis) (Paris, 2015, LGDJ-IUV, 2015, ISBN 978-2370320582)
- L'ordre et le monde, edited by Alain Badiou and Barbara Cassin (Paris, Fayard, 2016, ISBN 978-2213680880)
- D'après une image de Daesh (Paris, Lignes, 2017, ISBN 978-2-35526-164-0)
- Crépuscule (Paris, Au diable vauvert, 2019, ISBN 979-1030702606)
- Contre Macron (Paris, Éditions Divergence, 2019, ISBN 979-1097088125)
- Assange, l'antisouverain (Paris, Éditions du Cerf, 2020, ISBN 978-2204133074)
- La République ne vous appartient pas : Discours à polytechnique, (Paris, Au diable vauvert, 2020, ISBN 979-10-307-0379-5)
- Abattre l'ennemi (Paris,Éditions Michel Lafon, 2021, ISBN 978-2-7499-4697-9)
- Treize pillards (Paris, Au diable vauvert, 2022, ISBN 979-10-307-0507-2)
- Luttes (Paris, Michel Lafon, 2022, ISBN 978-2-7499-4955-0)
- Coup d'État: Manuel insurrectionnel (Paris, Au diable vauvert, 2023, ISBN 979-10-307-0625-3)
- Hanouna (Paris, Au diable vauvert, 2023, ISBN 979-10-307-0629-1)
- Paroles (Paris, Au diable vauvert, 2024, ISBN 979-10-307-0648-2)
- Comment fabriquer une guillotine (Paris, Au diable vauvert, 2024, ISBN 979-10-307-0706-9)
- La Renégation héroïque: Branco X Belhaj Kacem, with Mehdi Belhaj Kacem (Independently published, 2025, ISBN 979-8-263-18865-8)

Crépuscule, Branco's most successful work, sold more than 150,000 copies within a year of its publication and was downloaded around a million times. The book is a critique of Macron's presidency and challenges his legitimacy as a president whose election depended, in the opinion of the author, on the support of oligarchs and media barons. Reviewed in the French edition of the magazine Slate, the book was praised for its exploration of the networks of power in France, and criticised for its reliance on unsubstantiated claims. It originally appeared online in December 2018; an expanded version, edited by journalist and writer Denis Robert, was then published in print in March 2019. GQ magazine suggested that Crépuscule was "likely to be the work that defines this period".

In 2020 he published a biography of Assange called Assange, l'antisouverain. Le Point referred to the book as a literary selfie, more about the author than the subject.

== Bibliography ==
- Mariel Primois, Signé Branco, Paris, Au diable Vauvert, 2019.
- Franck Cormerais, Amar Lakel, Juan Branco, influenceur éphémère ou figure d’un nouvel « intellectuel numérique » ? in Quaderni 2023/2 (n°109), 39-58.
