= Al-Ghiran Brigade =

The Al-Ghiran Brigade(s), originating from Misrata, was a brigade formed with the purpose of safeguarding the Al-Ghiran region against pro-Gaddafi factions during the battle of Misrata. This brigade is known for being the one to capture Muammar Gaddafi, and eventually killing him after 8 months of fighting.

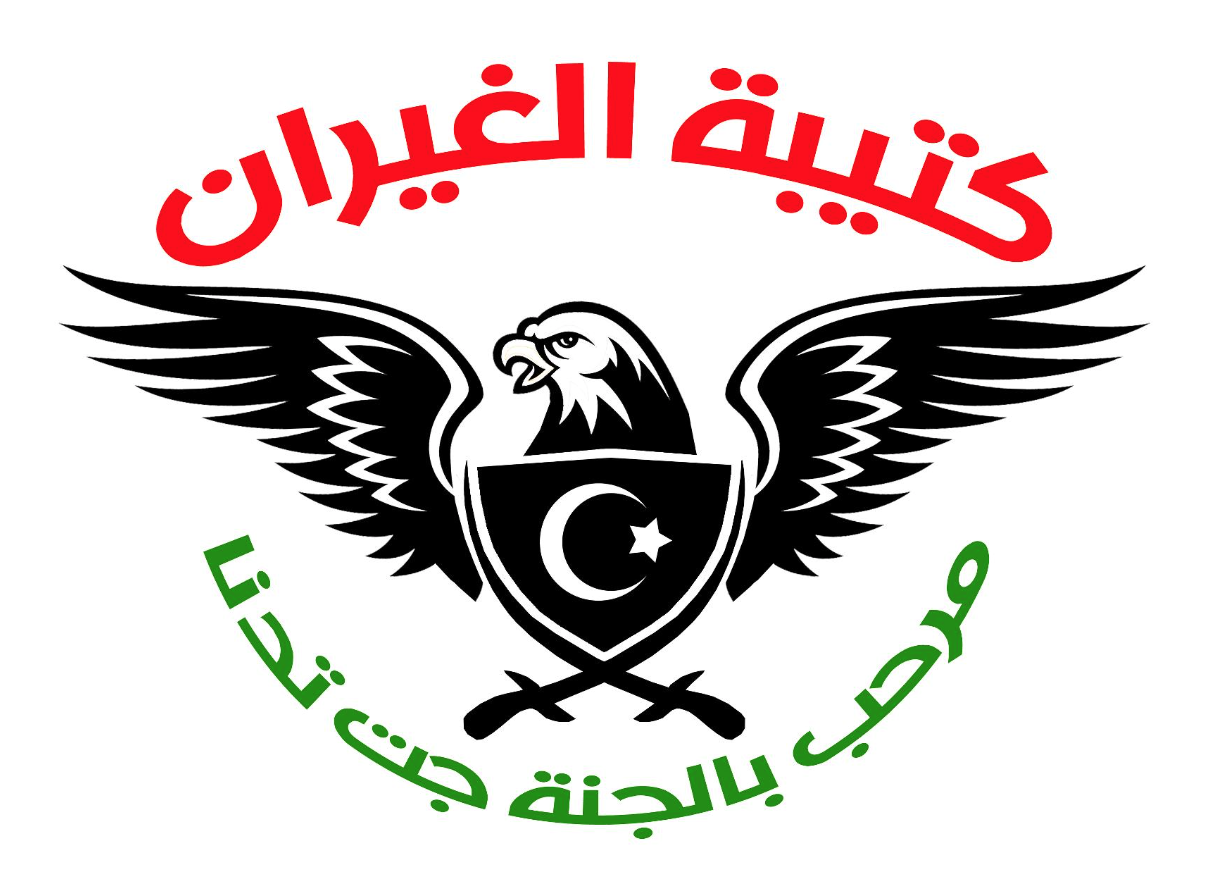
Emblem used to represent this battalion

During the Battle of Misrata (2011), forces loyal to Gaddafi entered the outskirts of Misrata, forcing civilians as well as children out of their homes and using them as human shields. Snipers were even posted up on rooftops of schools, hospitals, and residential buildings killing anyone, including civilians that came within range. This led to the formation of the Al-Ghiran Brigade(s).

The Al-Ghiran Brigade is a unification of various brigades that were all fighting alongside one another in order to defend the Al-Ghiran region, located on the outskirts of Misrata. Some of these brigades include the Al-Hamza Brigade, Misurata al-Hora Brigade, Al-A'asar Brigade, and the Al-Nimr brigade.
