= Mahmoud al-Werfalli =

Libyan Commander (1978–2021)

- Native name: محمود الورفلي
- Born: 1978
- Died: 24 March 2021 (aged 42–43) Benghazi, Libya
- Cause of death: Gunshot wound
- Allegiance: (Libya) Libyan Army (2000–2011); Libyan National Army (2014–2021)
- Branch: Libyan Special Forces
- Service years: 2000–2021
- Conflicts: First Libyan Civil War; Second Libyan Civil War

Mahmoud Mustafa Busayf al-Werfalli (Arabic: محمود مصطفى بوسيف الورفلي; 1978 – 24 March 2021) was a Libyan general, commander in al-Saiqa, an elite unit of the Libyan National Army, one of the warring factions in Libya's civil war since 2014. Al-Werfalli was indicted in 2017 in the International Criminal Court for the war crimes of murder and ordering the murder of non-combatants under article 8(2)(c)(i) of the Rome Statute. As of 6 April 2019, the ICC had two outstanding warrants for al-Werfalli's arrest. He was assassinated on 24 March 2021 in Benghazi.

== Childhood ==
Al-Werfalli was born in 1978. He was a member of the Warfalla tribe, which was loyal to former Libyan ruler Muammar Gaddafi and from which many members of Gaddafi's security forces were recruited.

== Military career ==
Al-Werfalli began his career in the Libyan Army in 2000 after graduating from the country's military college. He eventually became a member of the elite al-Saiqa unit and remained a member when the Libyan Civil War against Gaddafi's rule began in 2011. Soon thereafter al-Saiqa, under the command of Wanis Bukhmada, defected and joined the rebels.

Following the end of Gaddafi's rule, al-Saiqa aligned itself with the Libyan National Army, led by Khalifa Haftar, and fought against the Shura Council of Benghazi Revolutionaries in and around the city of Benghazi from 2014 to 2017 in a battle for control of the city. By at least 2017, al-Werfalli was a regional commander of al-Saiqa and oversaw at least one detention center. In that year al-Werfalli gained international notoriety by appearing in videos posted by al-Saiqa's social media accounts that depicted him executing or ordering the execution of prisoners. In total 7 videos were published. One video in particular allegedly depicted the execution of 20 men. Al-Werfalli's actions were singled out by the Office of the United Nations High Commissioner for Human Rights, which documented several of these incidents and called for a full investigation.

== International Criminal Court charge ==
Mahmoud al-Werfalli was indicted on 15 August 2017 with the war crime of murder with regard to the situation in Libya. The arrest warrant against him alleges that he "appears to be directly responsible for the killing of, in total, 33 persons in Benghazi or surrounding areas, between on or before 3 June 2016 and on or around 17 July 2017, either by personally killing them or by ordering their execution." The arrest warrant notes that in seven incidents, which were videoed and posted on al-Saiqa's social media accounts, al-Werfalli either appeared to order the execution, or conducted the execution himself, of prisoners. The Court notes in the arrest warrant that "the executions were exceptionally cruel, dehumanising and degrading." Two days after the Court issued the warrant of arrest, the Libyan National Army (LNA) announced that it had arrested al-Werfalli and that he was under investigation.

On 24 January 2018, he was accused of executing 10 prisoners in Benghazi. Automatically after that, an Interpol red notice against him, on behalf of International Criminal Court, was issued.

== Sanctions ==
In December 2019, the US Treasury Department included Al-Werfalli on its sanctions list, accusing him of committing serious human rights violations.

In its statement, the US Treasury said that Al-Werfalli was filmed on January 24, 2018, "carrying out a mass execution of ten unarmed detainees in Benghazi. After each detainee was shot in the head one by one, Al-Werfalli fired freely on a group of ten detainees who were executed."

In September 2020, he was also sanctioned by the EU, for the same criminal charges.

== Assassination ==
On 24 March 2021, Libyan media quoted a spokesman for the "Libyan National Army" as confirming that "the military commander, Mahmoud Al-Werfalli, was killed in Benghazi."

Al-Werfalli died after his car was hit by bullets near Al-Arab Medical University in Benghazi. His brother was injured in the attack and was taken to intensive care.
