= Warfalla =

Arab tribe in Libya

Warfalla ورفلة
- Ethnicity: Arabs and Arabized Berbers
- Location: Eastern Tripolitania, Libya
- Population: 1,000,000
- Demonym: Al-Warfalli
- Language: Arabic
- Religion: Sunni Islam

Warfalla (Arabic: ورفلة) is a tribal confederation of mixed Arab and Arabized Berber origin that resides in Tripolitania, western Libya, mainly in their stronghold of Bani Walid. Warfalla historically inhabited the area bounded by the cities of Bani Walid and Sirte, as well as the town of Sabha. The Warfalla tribe, along with the Qadhadhfa and Magarha, were the backbone of Muammar Gaddafi's regime. The Warfalla tribe is considered a confederacy of 52 sub-tribes that consist of individual bayts or clans. Warfalla is estimated to be Libya's largest tribe with approximately one million members.

== Origin ==
The Warfalla tribal confederation is of mixed origin. It includes Arabized Berber tribes descended from Hawwara, as well as Arab Bedouin tribes descended from Banu Hilal. By the sixteenth century, the Arab migrations to the Maghreb and subsequent intermarriage with indigenous populations had largely Arabized the region, giving rise to mixed Arab-Berber tribes that included the Warfalla. Arab tribes then joined the tribal confederation in a sort of tribal brotherhood (muwakhah), until 52 sub-tribes emerged, establishing the tribal confederation of Warfalla.

== History ==
=== Italian colonization ===
During the Italian invasion of Libya in 1911, the Warfalla tribe, under the leadership of 'Abd al-Nabi Bel Khayre, fought against the invaders until the fall of Bani Walid, the Warfalla tribe's territory in December 1923. The Warfalla remained neutral under Bel Khayre's leadership during the war against the Italians. It was until the Italians reached the Warfalla that they fought the Italians. In 1915, the shaykhs of Warfalla wrote a letter to the British consul in Tripoli, stating their opinion towards the Italian colonial state:

We are the notables of the district of Warfalla, still keeping our independence which was given to us by our lord the Sultan. And in case any power attacks us, we are obliged to defend our dear homeland to the last soul. Thus we urge you to inform the Italian government that we are protecting our independence and if Italy decides to attack us, we will be forced to fight her.

— Shaykhs of Warfalla

Rival of 'Abd al-Nabi from the Misurata tribe, Ramadan, began to collect taxes from around the Warfalla, which 'Abd al-Nabi saw as a threat to his influence. On August 20, 1920, Ramadan planned a surprise attack on the Warfalla with a force of 2,000 men. Due to the lack of water resources, Ramadan's attack failed and many of his men died of the summer heat, including Ramadan himself. This led to a civil war between the tribes and peasants of the Jabal al Gharbi District from 1920 to 1922 competing for political offices in the Tripolitanian Republic.

=== Role in the Gaddafi regime ===
The Warfalla, together with the Qadhafa and the Magarha, were traditionally considered the pillars of Gaddafi’s rule, dominating the security services and the ranks of the military. Gaddafi drew many of his security personnel from the Warfalla tribe, and placed certain Warfalla leaders in his "revolutionary committees" (besides members of the Maqarha and his own Qadhafa tribe), a paramilitary force entrusted with securing loyalty to the Qaddafis, by force if necessary.

However, this support has been inconsistent, most notably in the mounting of the 1993 Libyan coup attempt by Warfalla members of Gaddafi’s government in 1993, as a result of their rivalry with the Magarha for top positions within the government, the failure of the coup attempt to overthrow Gaddafi resulted in a temporary decline of Warfalla influence in the Libyan power structure, as many leading members were purged and a number of Warfalla leaders and civilians were either imprisoned or executed.

=== Role in the 2011 Libyan civil war ===
In the early weeks of February 2011 Libyan Civil War the Warfalla tribe leaders gave their support to the Gaddafi regime, but while the tribe has often been identified with the Gaddafi regime, there were many Warfalla who actively opposed his rule, including Mahmoud Jibril (el-Warfally), the titular head of the opposition National Transitional Council (NTC).

Akram al-Warfelli, a leading figure of the tribe, called for Gaddafi to stand down in late February 2011. “We tell the brother, he’s no longer a brother, we tell him to leave the country,” he told Al-Jazeera. On the 28-29 of May, over 100 tribal leaders, most of them Warfalla, met to call for an end to the fighting in Libya and the removal of Mu'ammar Qaddafi and his sons from the Libyan government.

== Notable Warfalla ==
- Mahmoud Jibril – Libyan politician, Prime Minister of National Transitional Council
- Mahmoud al-Werfalli – Libyan general, commander of al-Saiqa

== See also ==
- Al-Warfalli
