= Bani Walid =

City in Libya

Bani Walid بني وليد
- City
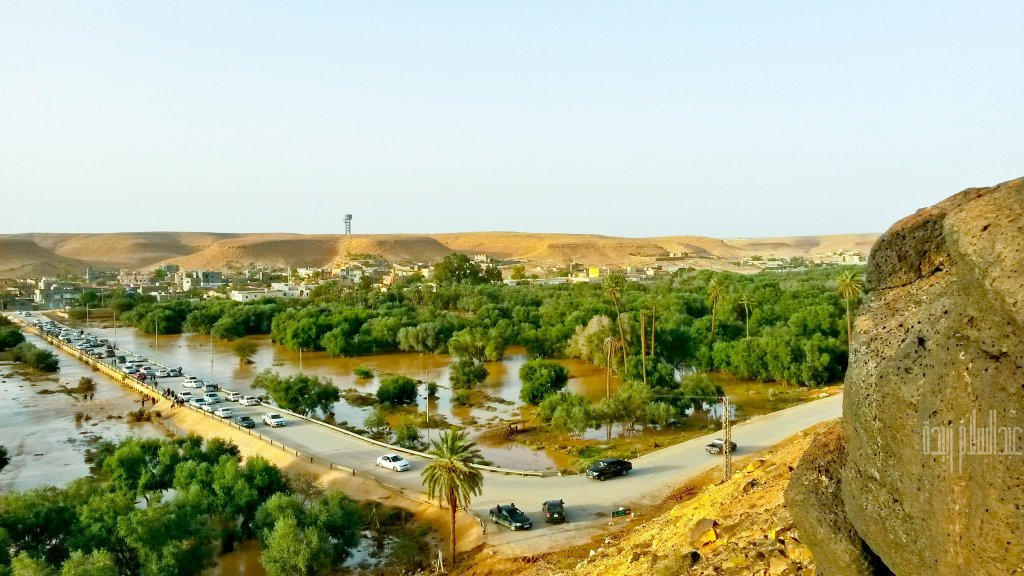
- Bani Walid seen from the castel of the city
- Nickname: دردنيل طرابلس الغرب; Arabic: Dardanelles of Tripoli
- Location in Libya
- Coordinates: 31°45′43″N 14°00′50″E
- Country: Libya
- Region: Tripolitania
- District: Bani Walid/Sof-Aljeen
- Elevation: 1,591 ft (485 m)

Population (2013)
  - Total: 85,425
- Time zone: UTC+2 (EET)
- Area code: 322
- License Plate Code: 28
- Website: https://bwmc.ly

Bani Walid (Anglicized: /ˈbæniː wɑːˈliːd/; Arabic: بني وليد, romanized: Banī Walīd, Libyan pronunciation: [ˈbæni wæˈliːd]) is a city in Libya located in the Tripoli Region. Prior to 2007, it was the capital of Sof-Aljeen District. Bani Walid has an airport. Under the Libyan Arab Jamahiriya, it was divided into two Basic People's Congresses: Dahra – Bani Walid (الظهرة – بني وليد), and Zaytouna – Bani Walid (الزيتونة – بني وليد).

It is the home to the Warfalla tribe, the only city in which only one tribe resides. A campus of Bani Walid University is located in Bani Walid.

== Libyan civil war ==
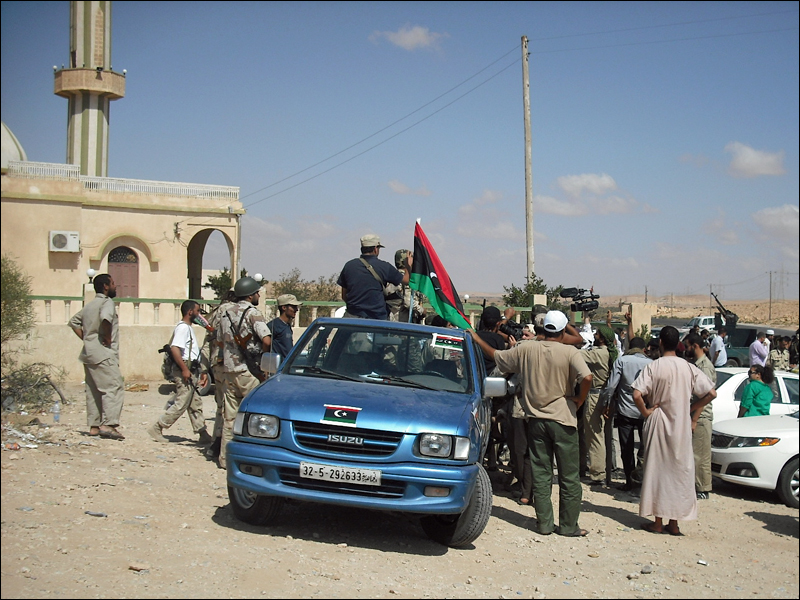
Bani Walid during the Libyan Civil War

In the 2011 Libyan Civil War, after the anti-Gaddafi forces captured Tripoli in August and Sabha in September, Bani Walid, along with Sirte, was one of two final strongholds held by forces loyal to the ousted government of Muammar Gaddafi. There were clashes between anti-Gaddafi forces surrounding the city and Gaddafi loyalists defending it throughout September and early October; the city was finally taken on 17 October.

In the 1980s Finnish company Perusyhtymä (today YIT) constructed a factory in the city used for the assembly of rifles and possibly other weapons. NATO reported that it had hit two "command hubs" in the city and one ammunition dump. It is possible that the latter had originally been built by the Finns. 200 Finnish engineers and other experts worked in Bani Walid. Some had their families in the area. The "dirty jobs" were done by around 2,000 cheap labourers from the Philippines.

In Finland, the media found out about the construction of the weapons factory in 1994 and 2011. In the 1980s, Libya was the second-largest country of export for the Finnish construction industry, after the Soviet Union. In the early 1980s, Finns had about 20 major construction projects in Libya. In addition to the weapon factory, other Finnish constructions included streets in Tripoli and the entire oil city of Ras Lanuf. A large number of Libyan architects have been trained with Finnish help. Construction export became more difficult after the UN set up a trade embargo in 1992. As late as 2008, a shopping complex designed by Finns was being built.

=== Post-civil war violence ===
On 23 January 2012, around 100–150 local fighters attacked the main NTC army base in Bani Walid, killing eight NTC fighters and wounding at least 20 others. On 25 January 2012, Libya's defense Minister recognised the newly formed local tribal council, which overthrew the local NTC council, as the new authority of Bani Walid.

In October 2012, a successful armed campaign to recapture the city was launched.

People smugglers operate torture camps in the city, holding Eritrean migrants for ransom.

== Transportation ==
The city is served by the Bani Walid Airport, located 4.5 kilometres (2.8 mi) west of the city centre.

== Educational ==
There is a public university named Bani Walid university and a college:

- Bani Walid University
- College of Electronic Technology Bani Walid

== Sports ==
Al Dhahra Bani Walid is the local football team, which currently plays in the second tier of Libyan football.

Al Qadisiyah Bani Walid is currently competing in Libya's top flight as of early 2026.

== See also ==
- List of cities in Libya
