= Media of Libya =

The media of Libya consists of a broad range of newspapers, TV channels, radio stations, and websites mostly set up during or after the Libyan Civil War, which removed previously tight restrictions on freedom of the press and freedom of speech. By the summer of 2012, there were over 200 registered newspapers, over 20 TV channels, and 200 radio stations.

The media landscape in Libya is fluid - many Libyans are taking advantage of the unprecedented freedoms newly available to them. Of the hundreds of newspapers that appeared during and in the immediate aftermath of the 2011 revolution, few are still published with any regularity. But new newspapers keep being launched. Radio stations - especially local ones - are thriving with each city and town catering to their local audience's need to express their voice. The number of TV stations is similarly growing. The private media sector is steadily expanding despite concerns regarding its financial sustainability.

== News agencies and websites ==
- Libyan News Agency وكالة الانباء الليبيه - state-run "Lana" - formerly Jamahiriya News Agency "Jana"
- Fawasel Media منصة فواصل
- Iwan Libya ايوان ليبيا
- Ean Libya عين ليبيا
- Akhbar Libya اخبار ليبيا
- Almarsad صحيفة المرصد
- AfrigateNews بوابة افريقيا
- Libya Al-Mostakbal ليبيا المستقبل
- Bawwabat Al-Wasat بوابة الوسط
- Al-Tadamun News Agency - originally started in Switzerland in February 2011, later moved to Benghazi, Libya
- Mathaba News Agency - independent pro-Gaddafi news site that continued after the 2011 Libyan Revolution
- Tawasul News Agency (TNA) - private news agency, via social media
- Akhbar Libya 24 (AL24) - independent news website, based in Benghazi, publishing in-depth news and reports.

== Print media ==
=== State-owned daily newspapers ===
- Febrayer - February Newspaper

=== Private newspapers ===
- Al-Bilad - daily
- Brnieq
- Tripoli Post - English-language weekly and online
- New Quryna (formerly Yosberides, Quryna) - daily
- Libya Herald - online English-language daily

== Television ==
Libya Radio and Television Corporation (LRTC) is the successor to the Gaddafi-era state broadcaster. More than 20 TV stations, many privately owned, broadcast from Libyan cities and from Middle East media hubs.

=== State owned TV stations ===
- Libya Radio and Television Corporation (LRTC)
  - Libya Al-Wataniyah TV
  - Libya Al-Rasmiyah TV

=== Private TV stations ===
- Almasar TV
- Al-Asimah TV
- Allibya TV
- Libya Alhurra TV
- Libya TV - aka Libya al-Ahrar; Qatar-based satellite station, launched in April 2011.

== Radio ==
=== State owned radio stations ===
- Libya Radio and Television Corporation (LRTC) is the successor to the Gaddafi-era state broadcaster. Operates Radio Libya, Al-Shababiyah, Al-Itha'ah al-Wataniya.

=== Private radio stations ===
Dozens of radio outlets, many privately owned, broadcast from Libyan cities and from Middle East media hubs. The BBC World Service Arabic broadcasts on 91.5 FM in Tripoli, Benghazi, and Misrata.

- Al Aan FM: Broadcasts on 105.3 MHz, covering Al Bayda, Al Marj, Benghazi, Misrata, Labraq, Nalut, Sabha, Sirte, Susah, Tobruk and Tripoli.
- Allibya FM
- Libya FM - Egypt-based
- Tribute FM: An English-language internet station broadcasting from Benghazi. Website
- Voice of Africa
- Voice of Free Libya - Benghazi-based, Al-Bayda, Misrata

== Government regulation ==
A new constitution has yet to be written and approved, but Article 14 of the Interim Constitutional Declaration adopted on 3 August 2011 guarantees freedom of expression and freedom of the press:

“Freedom of opinion for individuals and groups, freedom of scientific research, freedom of communication, liberty of the press, printing, publication and mass media, freedom of movement, freedom of assembly, freedom of demonstration and freedom of peaceful strike shall be guaranteed by the State in accordance with the law.”

A framework for media policy and regulation has yet to be developed, but authorities during and after the 2011 revolution have made several attempts to bring the sector under official oversight and regulation. Experienced media professionals and newcomers are skeptical about these efforts and have resisted efforts to bring their industry under the control of transitional authorities.

- In December 2011, the National Transitional Council (NTC) placed state media under the supervision of the Ministry of Culture and Civil Society.
- On 19 May 2012 the NTC, following demonstrations by journalists in front of their headquarters, issued three decrees shifting the state's media assets from the Ministry of Culture and Civil Society to a High Media Council, which reports directly to the NTC.
- On 13 June 2012, the implementation of the High Media Council was suspended following further demonstrations by journalists and a formal complaint from the Ministry of Culture and Civil Society.
- On 5 July 2012, the NTC recognized the High Media Council with new members elected at the Jadu Media Forum on 25 June 2012. Financial responsibility for the state broadcasters was returned to the Ministry of Culture and Civil Society.
- In November 2012, the newly elected General National Congress voted to create a Ministry of Information, replacing both High Media Councils created earlier in the year.
- On 30 December 2012, Prime Minister Ali Zeidan nominated Yousef Mohamed Sherif as Minister of Information.

== See also ==
- Communications in Libya
- Free speech in the media during the Libyan civil war
- Internet in Libya
- Internet censorship in Libya
- List of newspapers in Libya
