= Free speech in the media during the Libyan civil war (2011) =

Free speech in the media during the Libyan civil war describes the ability of domestic and international media to report news inside Libya free from interference and censorship during the civil war.

This synopsis from Al Jazeera gives a sense of what the media war was like as of 12 March:

When protests first began in Libya the media presence there was scarce so the story filtered out via social media thanks to courageous citizen journalists. Then, when the fighting intensified, global media numbers increased exponentially. Now there are hoards [sic] of international news teams camped out with rebel forces or reporting from the country's capital and Gaddafi stronghold, Tripoli.

There is a cacophony of competing narratives coming out of Libya. From propaganda on the country's state-run broadcaster, to propaganda on rebel-controlled radio, to international reporting with a clear agenda, it is enough to make your head spin.

== Media conditions prior to the civil war ==
According to a BBC overview of Libyan media as of March 2011, "the state strictly controls the media", "the Libyan Jamahiriya Broadcasting Corporation is the state broadcaster", and "most Libyan newspapers are either directly or indirectly owned by the government".

The Libyan government authorized non-governmental media in 2007, leading to the launch of newspapers and a satellite TV service by a company affiliated with one of Colonel Gaddafi's sons. But the nationalization of these ventures in 2009 signaled the end to several years of improving conditions for the media. In January 2010 Libya began censoring the Internet. YouTube was blocked on 24 January following the posting of videos of demonstrations by the families of prisoners in the city of Benghazi, and of footage of members of Muammar Gaddafi's family attending parties. Other independent opposition websites were blocked at the same time.

In 2009 Libya had 1.1 million fixed-line and 5.0 million mobile-cellular telephone subscribers for a combined fixed-mobile density approaching 100 telephones per 100 persons. In 2009 a single government-owned service-provider offered Internet access to an estimated 5.5 percent of the population.

Libyan law provided for freedom of speech "within the limits of public interest and principles of the Revolution", but in practice freedom of speech and the press was severely limited, particularly criticism of government officials or policy. Penalties included life prison-sentences for spreading news or information that could "tarnish the country's reputation or undermine confidence in it abroad" and the death penalty for "whoever spreads within the country, by whatever means, theories or principles aiming to change the basic principles of the Constitution or the fundamental structures of the social system or to overthrow the state's political, social or economic structures or destroy any of the fundamental structures of the social system using violence, terrorism or any other unlawful means". Given the broad nature of these prohibitions and the harsh penalties attached, Libyan journalists practiced a considerable degree of self-censorship.

== Television ==
Libya's state-owned TV made no mention of the anti-government protests in the east of the country on 16 February and continued with its usual programming on 17 February. During its morning bulletin, Libyan TV continuously showed demonstrations in support of leader Col Muammar Gaddafi, which the TV said had been held "across Libya". There were about 200 to 300 demonstrators, the vast majority of whom were men, at each protest shown. At one point, a crowd could be heard chanting anti-Al Jazeera TV slogans. The TV started broadcasting a pro-Gaddafi demonstration live from Sirte, his home town, at around 1000 GMT. The numbers demonstrating were significantly greater than the previous day, with the crowd chanting: "Oh Jazeera! You despicable one." The TV aired live coverage of a speech by Gaddafi from the evening before, in which he denounced both the United States and their "Zionist" allies in front of a cheering crowd.

The signal of the TV satellite operator Nilesat was jammed starting 23 February. The stations carried by Nilesat included U.S.-based Al-Hurra, Qatar-based Al-Jazeera, and UAE-based Al-Arabiya, which had been providing live coverage of the recent events and interviewing residents by telephone.

Libya Alhurra TV (Arabic: قناة ليبيا الحرة), meaning Free Libya TV, is an Internet television channel founded by Mohamed Nabbous at the start of the Libyan civil war to provide news and on-ground footage from Benghazi. It was the first private television station in Benghazi, in the east of the country and the only TV broadcast from Benghazi when the internet was shut down as the war began. Alhurra TV was able to bypass government blocks on the Internet in order to broadcast live images from Benghazi across the world. On 19 March, Nabbous was killed by pro-Gaddafi troops during the Second Battle of Benghazi.

Libya TV, also known as Libya Al-Ahrar TV, is a satellite TV channel broadcast from Doha, Qatar. It was created in late March 2011 by the National Transitional Council, after the NTC media minister, Mahmum Shammam, recruited a small group of volunteers via Facebook. With headquarters in Doha and studios in Doha, Benghazi, and London, Libya TV has correspondents throughout Libya. Libya TV admits to being a propaganda tool in the effort to dislodge the country's long-time leader, but show hosts have welcomed pro-Gaddafi loyalists to call in and air their views. The channel expected to make a decision sometime in October 2011 about staying in Doha or moving to Tripoli. In September 2012 Libya TV was broadcasting from Doha and had studios in Benghazi and Tripoli.

NATO air strikes on the Tripoli headquarters of the state-owned national TV broadcaster Al-Jamahiriya and two of its installations on 30 July killed three of its journalists and wounded 21 others, according to reports by Al-Jamahiriya which could not be immediately verified. NATO said it carried out the air strikes in order to silence the regime's "terror broadcasts" and put a stop to its "use of satellite television as a means to intimidate the Libyan people and incite acts of violence against them."

Al Urubah, a pro-Gaddafi television station, broadcast messages from the deposed leader and his information minister, Moussa Ibrahim, following the fall of Tripoli in August 2011. Al Urubah, Al-Jamahiriyah, and Al-Shababiyah have been off the air since late August 2011.

== Radio ==
The Voice of Free Libya (Arabic: Sawt Libya al-Hurra) or sometimes Radio Free Libya (Arabic: Idha'at Libya al-Hurra) are the names used by several radio stations aligned with the Libyan rebels. The stations began operating from the cities of Benghazi, Bayda, and Misrata in February 2011. Other rebel-controlled radio stations are reported to operate in Tobruk, Nalut, Jadu, Derna, and Zliten. The outlets operate independently and with separate programing, although they share similar aims. They all carry material strongly supportive of the rebels and firmly critical of Gaddafi. Output is in Arabic, with the Nalut station also said to use Berber (Tamazight).

In May 2011, an English-language station, Tribute FM, began broadcasting from Benghazi. There is no evidence that this station has any connection with the Voice of Free Libya station in the same city.

The former youth station, Al-Shababiyah FM, was re-launched under the new name, Al-Shababiyah 17 February FM, in late August 2011.

== Newspapers ==
Headlines on 17 February in state-owned Libyan papers continued to highlight pro-Gaddafi demonstrations or his public engagements. Quryna, which was previously part of Saif al-Islam Gaddafi's Al-Ghad Media Corporation but is now state-owned, carried an upbeat report about order being restored in Benghazi. One article reported on the families of "17 February 2006 martyrs" who met the Libyan leader and condemned the protests. The front page of state-owned Al-Jamahiriya was dedicated to pro-Gaddafi demonstrations and his public appearance at the Ahly football club in Tripoli the day before, while state-owned Al-Shams led exclusively with coverage of this event.

The Libyan civil war has brought forth many new magazines and newspapers, including Al-Jazirah Al-Libiyah, Intifada Al-Ahrar, Al-Kalima, Libya Hurriya (Free Libya), Akhbar Al-Aan and many others. At the end of March there were half a dozen or so new publications. By the beginning of May that had grown to 28, by late May to 65, and in August it was over 120. So far all are weeklies and almost all are in Arabic. The Libya Post is the first all English language publication. Staffs run the gamut from enthusiastic amateur to professional. In spite of the large number of new publications, much of the coverage of the Libyan conflict has been left to international media outlets such as CNN and Al Jazeera, in part due to a lack of experienced professional staff, in part to years of living under a repressive media regime, and in part due to a shortage of financing.

Yosberides (Arabic: يوسبريدس) is a privately owned Libyan newspaper published weekly in print and on the internet. Based in Benghazi, the country's second largest city, its original name was Quryna (Arabic: قورينا). It was part of Al-Ghad Media Corporation owned by Colonel Gaddafi's son Saif al-Islam until it was nationalized in 2009. Its reporting was sympathetic to Gaddafi until rebel forces took control of Benghazi in early 2011. After that, it reported more openly and claimed to be impartial. On 23 February Reuters described it as "Libya's most reliable media outlet". However, there have been reports that the paper was seized by protesters and its web site shows the flag of the Libyan Republic, which the rebels use.

After opposition forces went into Tripoli on 21 August, publication of state-owned newspapers, such as Al-Shams, ceased.

== International media ==
At the start of the conflict in late February and early March 2011, few international journalists operated in Libya. They worked under the close supervision of government minders and could not travel freely. As a result, international news organizations frequently relied on phone reports from people actually on the ground. This in turn meant that the media could not independently verify accounts and so reported them as "claims" or "allegations" rather than as "facts". The restrictions on and the attempts to control the media by the Gaddafi-regime continued until the government fled from Tripoli.

The opposition badly wanted to get its story out to the rest of the world and so, as soon as they acquired a territorial base in Benghazi, foreign reporters were able to join them. These reporters were, to a large extent, free to travel wherever and to talk to whomever they wished within opposition-controlled areas. This proximity and relative freedom of access to the opposition side of events, combined with reporters' natural sympathies for what they see as genuine popular rebellions against despotic regimes, undoubtedly aided the opposition and hurt the Gaddafi-government in getting their respective messages out.

According to Reporters Without Borders, the Libyan authorities continue to stigmatize the foreign media. On 21 February Muammar Gaddafi referred to foreign TV stations as "stray dogs", while the Foreign Minister warned that the pro-Gaddafi forces would regard any journalists illegally entering Libya as agents of Al-Qaeda.

On the morning of 4 March the foreign journalists present in Tripoli were barred from leaving their hotels. Security agents blocked all attempts by reporters to leave the Rixos Al Nasr Hotel in the center of the capital, which housed 130 journalists invited by the government. Threatening to arrest all those who went out without permission, government spokesman Moussa Ibrahim said the presence of journalists on the street could provoke violence.

On 11 March Brazilian reporter Andrei Netto of the O Estado de S. Paulo newspaper was released by pro-Gaddafi forces after being held for eight days. Netto, who is normally based in Paris, was arrested by pro-Gaddafi forces at the Tunisian-Libyan border as he was trying to resolve problems regarding the way he had entered the country. His newspaper said he was beaten and kept blindfolded during the eight days he was held in Sabratha, a town 60 km west of Tripoli.

CNN Senior International Correspondent Nic Robertson and his crew were detained on 11 March in Tajura, east of Tripoli, by forces loyal to Libyan leader Muammar Gaddafi. According to Robertson "This was no accidental arrest, no fortunate stumbling across a news team. They [Gaddafi enforcers] had planned this all along." The taxi driver, who was driving the crew and Robertson, was also held. According to Robertson the taxi driver had "done nothing more than give us a ride. He had no idea he might get into trouble." Robertson and his crew were released later the same day.

Unidentified gunmen shot and killed Ali Hassan al-Jaber, a cameraman working for the Qatar-based satellite TV station Al-Jazeera, on 12 March in an ambush on the outskirts of the eastern Libyan city of Benghazi. Al-Jazeera said Al Jaber was returning to Benghazi after reporting in a nearby town when the gunmen opened fire on his car, killing him and another passenger. Wadah Khanfar, the director-general of Al Jazeera, said that the killing came after "an unprecedented campaign" against the network by Libyan leader Muammar Gaddafi.

On 7 April, following a series of individual arrests and deportations in previous weeks, the Libyan government decided to deport 26 foreign journalists, who had all been invited to Tripoli by the government, on the grounds that their visas had expired. As of 18 April several journalists being held by the government had been released. While the exact number of journalists still being held remained unknown, at least five foreign journalists were still being detained.

On 18 May Libya released four foreign journalists, one day after a suspended sentence of one year and a $154 fine were imposed for their illegal entry to Libya. The British, Spanish, and two American journalists were captured on 4 April by Muammar al-Gaddafi's military and detained for six weeks. The journalists worked for The New York Times, GlobalPost, the Atlantic, USA Today, and the BBC.

While foreign journalists reported from opposition-controlled areas in relative freedom, there were regular reports of opposition fighters preventing reporters from covering events they considered embarrassing. Such incidents seemed to increase in May and June as the push to overthrow Gaddafi stalled. For example in the rebel enclave of Misrata, 188 kilometres (117 miles) from Tripoli, opposition officials prevented journalists from traveling to the front and required them to use only "approved" translators, a condition not imposed in other areas under opposition control.

On 24 August, four Italian journalists were kidnapped by Gaddafi loyalists on the road to Zawiya, about 40 km west of Tripoli and were taken to an apartment in the capital. Their abductors killed their Libyan driver in front of them. The journalists say they were roughed up and their equipment and material confiscated. Their abduction came on the eve of a visit to Italy by Mahmoud Jibril, the Prime Minister of the opposition National Transitional Council, for a meeting with Italian Prime Minister Silvio Berlusconi. The four journalists were released by their captors the next day.

Seven foreign journalists were wounded in late August and September. Russian journalist Orkhan Djamal, of the daily Izvestia, sustained a non-life-threatening leg-injury during fighting in Tripoli on 22 August. Paris Match photographer Alvaro Canovas was shot in the thigh while covering a rebel assault in Tripoli on 23 August. France 2 cameraman Bruno Girodon was shot near the Bab al-Azizia complex in Tripoli on 24 August.

Mohamed Ballout, a journalist with dual French and Lebanese nationality working for the BBC, was injured in Bani Walid on 16 September when a round fired by a pro-Gaddafi sniper killed one man, passed through the body of another man, and hit Mohammed under the arm, in a gap in his bullet-proof vest. Shrapnel from an exploding shell seriously injured the French freelance photographer Olivier Sarbil in the face, arms and legs during fighting between pro- and anti-Gaddafi forces on 17 September in Sirte.

== Internet ==
On 1 February 2011 state security police arrested the writer and political commentator Jamal al-Hajji, who had used the Internet to call for peaceful protests in Libya. At the start of the uprising on 16 February, state security police arrested the director of local news-site Irasa, Taqi Al-Din Al-Chalawi, and its editor, Abdel Fattah Bourwaq. Blogger Mohammed Al-Ashim Masmari was also arrested after he reported on the demonstrations for the BBC and Al-Jazeera.

On 18 February, the day after the first protests that lead to the civil war, Libya withdrew all of its BGP prefix announcements from the Internet for a short period, cutting Libya off from the rest of the Internet. The prefixes were re-advertised six hours later.

There was no Internet traffic for several hours on 19 February and again the next day. Traffic picked up over the next few days to almost normal levels. On 22 February, XS4ALL, a Netherlands-based ISP, made its modem lines available for free. (While international calls are expensive, they do provide an alternative when regular Internet access is blocked.)

At 6:00 am on 3 March, Internet traffic effectively ceased, except for a very limited amount of traffic carried on satellite links, when the government severed the underwater backbone fiber-optic cable that runs along the coast and links networks in the east to servers in the west of the country. Engineers believed that the break occurred between the cities of Misrata and Khoms, and could be a physical or electronic rupture.

From 10 July Internet traffic began increasing again and, after a brief shutdown on 15 July, it reached roughly 15% of its previous levels.

On 12 August the Gaddafi regime announced that "any citizen in possession of a Thuraya [satellite telephone] must hold an authorisation to use it in accordance with the laws and regulations" and otherwise would "be punished according to the law that criminalizes communicating with the enemy in time of war, and stipulates penalties up to the death penalty".

After 22 August, the day Tripoli fell to the rebels, Internet traffic began increasing again and by 2 September had reached daily levels in excess of 50% and often as high as 75% of pre-war levels.

Social media networks are used in two distinct ways during conflicts: as organizing tools and as broadcasting platforms. During the civil war in Libya the emphasis was on broadcasting to the rest of the world, because only a relatively few Libyans (5%) had access to the Internet, because the Internet was already being filtered by the government prior to the start of protests in mid-February, and because the Internet in Libya was almost completely shutdown by the government starting in early March.

Citizen journalists provided an alternative to the official media in their portrayal of the protests and the turmoil across the country. While state media showed only pro-Gaddafi protests, pictures and video from mobile phones that made their way from Libya onto Facebook pages told a different story. When Facebook and Twitter were blocked inside the country, users managed to circumvent restrictions by using satellite connections, proxy servers, and other means. Various other anti-government citizens compiled the amateur videos, pictures, and other sources of media onto websites to continue the protest. Early in the revolt some activists crossed into Egypt to post online videos and photos taken with mobile phones or tweeted news about events in the country. The hacker group Anonymous provided Libyans with tools to get round the censorship and some of its members reportedly managed to set up parallel networks. The group also helped people to pass on photos and videos.

NATO used Twitter, Facebook, YouTube, and other online media as part of a wide range of sources of information, ranging from unmanned aerial drones to television news, to help determine potential targets for air-strikes in Libya and to assess their success.

== See also ==
- Internet censorship in the Arab Spring
