= Mass media in Libya =

Mass media in Libya describes the overall environment for the radio, television, telephone, Internet, and newspaper markets in Libya.

The control of the media by Colonel Gaddafi's regime came to an end after the fall of Tripoli in August 2011, resulting in a mushrooming of new media outlets. Journalists are still experiencing extortion and blackmail, and are subject to assassinations since the beginning of the second civil war circa 2012 - 2016. Libya has adopted a few media laws outlawing the slander of the 17th February revolution, and active political parties that used to have affiliation with Gaddafi.

[Update 2016]: On 2013, Sharia law was adopted by Islamic Supreme court of Tripoli. Internet censorship has been invoked. Since the second civil war, journalists have been persecuted through kidnapping, assassination, and blackmail. Media outlets have been bombed and some strafed with small arms fire, over the course of 2013 - 2016. Freedom of speech has suffered a few blows since the killing of activists and bloggers making the country unsafe to freely report news or protest. These events appear to have happened during the period when Islamic brotherhood - or "more inclined to Islamic values" GNC political parties led by Nouri Abusahmein, who have issued a number of reforms or decrees that would formulate a more Islamic nation in Tripoli, that led to the creation of more fundamentalist laws (such as Internet censorship and adaptation of vague rules in reporting news banning critique of the February 17th revolution).

However, due to the breakup of country politically and the infighting between militia and authorities, and the rivalry to the Muslim brotherhood or, simply known as 'more salafi or fundamentalist Islamists' parties or groups, the country has fragmented in a plethora of different political beliefs. Including, the laws recently adopted by the Libyan Supreme court that affect the running of the country, which do not represent the rights and interests of all Libyan people, but seemingly, only the Islamic majority.

As of 2016, the new Unity government of national accord led by Faiez Seraj agreed to and organised with the help of the UN, is attempting to bring about political unity between the HoR of Tobruk and other governments to assess unity in the country, by removing the illegitimate and expired governments set up during the second civil war (such as Nouri Abusahmein's GNC), to in good faith re-balance the Libyan crisis.

== Radio ==
First radio service began in 1939 in Libya.

- Libya Radio and Television (LRT) is the successor to the Gaddafi-era state broadcaster. Dozens of radio outlets, many privately owned, broadcast from Libyan cities and from Middle East media hubs. The BBC World Service Arabic broadcasts on 91.5 FM in Tripoli, Benghazi, and Misrata.

Radio stations

- Al Aan FM: Broadcasts on 105.3 MHz, covering Al Bayda, Al Marj, Benghazi, Misrata, Labraq, Nalut, Sabha, Susah, Tobruk and Tripoli.
- Allibya FM
- Libya FM - Egypt-based
- Libya Radio and Television (LRT) - state-run, operates Radio Libya, Al-Shababiyah, Al-Itha'ah al-Wataniya
- LJBC Radio
- Tribute FM: an English-language internet station broadcasting from Benghazi
- Voice of Africa
- Voice of Free Libya - Benghazi-based, Al-Bayda, Misurata

Radio
1.35 million (1997)

== Television ==
Libyan Radio and Television (LRT) is the successor to the Gaddafi-era state broadcaster. More than 20 TV stations, many privately owned, broadcast from Libyan cities and from Middle East media hubs.

Television receivers
889,232 receivers, 149 per 1000 inhabitants (2005)

Television broadcast stations

- Allibya TV
- Libya TV - a.k.a. Libya al-Ahrar; Qatar-based satellite station, launched in April 2011. Homepage
- Libya al-hurra TV
- Libya Al-Wataniya TV - state-run
- Libya Radio and Television (LRT) - state-run
- Al-Asimah TV - private

== Telephones ==
In the course of the 2011 Libyan civil war, the government severed the physical communications links between the rebel-held east and the rest of Libya. However, the newer and less centralised Libyana network held copies of the HLR and engineers were able to restore some local services. With some assistance from the international community, and funded by an expatriate Libyan, a limited international service became available in mid-April. NTC officials were reported to be negotiating with Qtel, the Qatari-owned service provider, to restore full service to the rebel-held areas.

Telephones

- 814,000 fixed subscriptions, 12.58 per 100 inhabitants (2012)
- 1,228,300 fixed subscriptions, 19.33 per 100 inhabitants (2010)
- 9.6 million mobile cellular subscriptions, 148.19 per 100 inhabitants (2012)
- 10.9 million mobile cellular subscriptions, 171.52 per 100 inhabitants (2010)

Mobile telephone operators

- Al Madar
- Libyana

International dialing code: +218

== Internet ==
Facebook, X, and YouTube played important roles in bringing news to the world audience during the revolt. Facebook remains a favorite platform to view and comment on the news.

Internet censorship
was applied in 2013 blocking 'pornographic material' however was found to block other non pornographic related websites, including proxy sites and some political websites that belonged to rival groups / governments.

[references outdated] Please update

Social Media users

- 1,115,025 users, 19.9% of the population (2012)

904,604 users, 14.0% (2010)

Fixed broadband Internet subscriptions

- 67,300 subscriptions, 111th in the world, 1.0 subscriptions per 100 inhabitants (2012)
- 72,800 subscriptions, 98th in the world, 1.2 subscriptions per 100 inhabitants (2010)

Internet hosts

- 17,926 hosts, 121st in the world (2012)
- 17,787 hosts, 122nd in the world (2011)

IPv4 addresses allocated

- 299,008 addresses, 105th in the world, 44.4 per 1000 inhabitants (2012)

Top-level domain
.ly

Internet Service Providers (ISPs)

The Internet and telecommunications are mainly run by the government through a semi-private telecommunication company Libya Telecom & Technology. The company moderates and controls the use of the Internet in Libya.

- 23 ISPs As of 2013
- Libya Telecom & Technology (LTT) - a state-owned telecommunications company
- Aljeel Aljadeed for Technology a state-owned telecommunications company
- Al-Manarah - leading Libyan online community
- All Libyan Blogs - blog aggregator
- Bayt Al Shams (BsISP)
- Modern World Telecom (MWC)
- Vizocom

=== The Internet and the Libyan revolution ===
In 2006 Reporters Without Borders (RWB) removed Libya from their list of Internet enemies after a fact-finding visit found no evidence of Internet censorship. The OpenNet Initiative's 2007–2008 technical test results contradicted that conclusion, however. In 2009 ONI classified Internet filtering in Libya as selective in the political area and as no evidence in social, conflict/security, and Internet tools.

Prior to the Libyan revolution, Internet filtering under the Gaddafi regime had become more selective, focusing on a few political opposition Web sites. This relatively lenient filtering policy coincided with what was arguably a trend toward greater openness and increasing freedom of the press. However, the legal and political climate continued to encourage self-censorship in online media.

On 18 February 2011, the day after the first protests that were to lead to the 2011 Libyan revolution, Libya appeared to have withdrawn all of its BGP prefix announcements from the Internet for a short period, cutting it off from the rest of the global Internet. The prefix were re-advertised six hours later.

There was no traffic for several hours on 19 and 20 February. Service picked up over the next few days to almost normal levels until, at 6:00am on 3 March, traffic effectively ceased (except for very limited satellite links). The government had severed the underwater backbone fibre-optic cable that runs along the coast, linking networks in the east and servers in the west of the country. Engineers reckon the break is between the cities of Misrata and Khoms, and may be a physical or electronic rupture.

From 10 July traffic began increasing again, and after a brief shutdown on 15 July, it was reaching about 15% of its pre-17 February levels up to 22 August, the day Tripoli fell to the rebels. Traffic began increasing again at that point, and as of 2 September was reaching daily levels in excess of 50% and often as high as 75% of pre-war levels.

The overthrow of the Gaddafi regime in the fall of 2011 did not end an era of censorship. In 2012, RWB removed Libya from its list of countries under surveillance.

== Newspapers ==
Following the fall of the Gaddafi regime in August 2011 former state-affiliated dailies have closed and new titles have appeared, many short-lived. Benghazi has emerged as a publishing hub. There are as yet few daily newspapers and print runs are small.

Daily newspapers

- Al-Bilad - private daily
- Brnieq
- February - state-owned daily
- Libya Herald - private online English-language daily
- New Quryna - Benghazi-based private daily

Weekly newspapers

- Tripoli Post - private English-language weekly Homepage

News agencies and websites

- Al-Tadamun News Agency - originally started in Switzerland in February 2011, later moved to Benghazi, Libya
- Libyan News Agency Arabic: وكالة الانباء الليبية ("Lana") - state-run, formerly Jamahiriya News Agency ("Jana")
- Mathaba News Agency - independent pro-Gaddafi news site still in operation
- Tawasul News Agency (TNA) - private news agency, via social media
- Akhbar Libya 24 (AL24) - independent news website, based in Benghazi, publishing in-depth news and reports

== See also ==
- Media of Libya
