= Shibani =

Shibani can refer to:

- Shibani (given name), an Indian feminine given name
- Shibani (surname), an Arabic surname
- Al-Shibani Church, a church in Aleppo, Syria
