= Television in Libya =

Television in Libya has a penetration estimated at 76% for 2011.

== History ==
Television was introduced in Libya in December 1968, when two stations opened at Tripoli and Benghazi.

Before the 2011 civil war, there were eight free-to-air satellite channels headquartered in the country, seven of which were owned by the Libyan Jamahiriya Broadcasting Corporation. Libya Radio and Television Corporation (LRTC) has become the successor to the LJBC, and more than 20 stations are said to be broadcasting in the country.

Amongst the new independent satellite channels to have launched in 2011, were Al Watan TV, Alassema TV, Libya Al Ahrar TV and Libya Alhurra TV, all of which broadcast news, talk shows and current affairs. The private satellite TV station Libya al-Ahrar has been established with assistance from Qatar. Supporters of the former regime own the new Al-Jamahiriya channel (formerly known as "The Green Channel"). Recently 218 TV channel launched based in Amman targeting the Youth in Libya
