= List of newspapers in Libya =

Newspapers in Libya are published in the Arabic and English languages.

== History ==
Al Manqab Al Afriqi was the first newspaper in Libya, established in 1827 by the European consuls in Tripoli, and was published in French. In 1866, Tarablos al Gharb by the Wali of the Ottoman Sultanate was published in Othmani Turkish and Arabic. In 1897, Al Taraqqi was established. Il Giornale de Tripoli was published in Italian by Mohammad Marabet. Majallat Libya al Musawwara was published between 1935 and 1940. As for the Benghazi newspapers, most of them were founded and published after World War II. Benghazi was a city that had more than seven newspapers. Al Haqeeqa, Al Raqeeb, Al Zaman, Reportage, and Barqa were the leading five during the time between the 1950s and the 1970s.

Following the fall of the Gaddafi government in August 2011, former state-affiliated dailies closed and new titles appeared, many short-lived. Benghazi emerged as a publishing hub. As of 2012, there were few daily newspapers and print runs were small.

== Newspapers in the new era ==
- Al Bayan - Benghazi
- Al Bilad - Tripoli
- Al Haqeeqa - Benghazi
- Al Kalima - Bengazi
- Al Manara - Bengazi
- Al Maydan - Benghazi
- Bernice - Benghazi
- Birniq - Bengazi
- Fabriar - Tripoli
- Fawasel - local news publication
- Hawsh Al Mighar - Derna
- Libya Al Jadida - Tripoli
- Libya Herald - Tripoli, online English-language publication
- Libyan Times - Benghazi
- The Libya Times - online English-language publication
- The Libya Observer - online English-language publication, since 2014
- The Libya Update - online English-language publication
- Libya Post
- Quryna (Cyrene) - Benghazi
- Tripoli Post - online weekly English-language publication

== See also ==
- Lists of newspapers
- Media of Libya
- Communications in Libya
- Mathaba News Agency
