= List of museums in Syria =

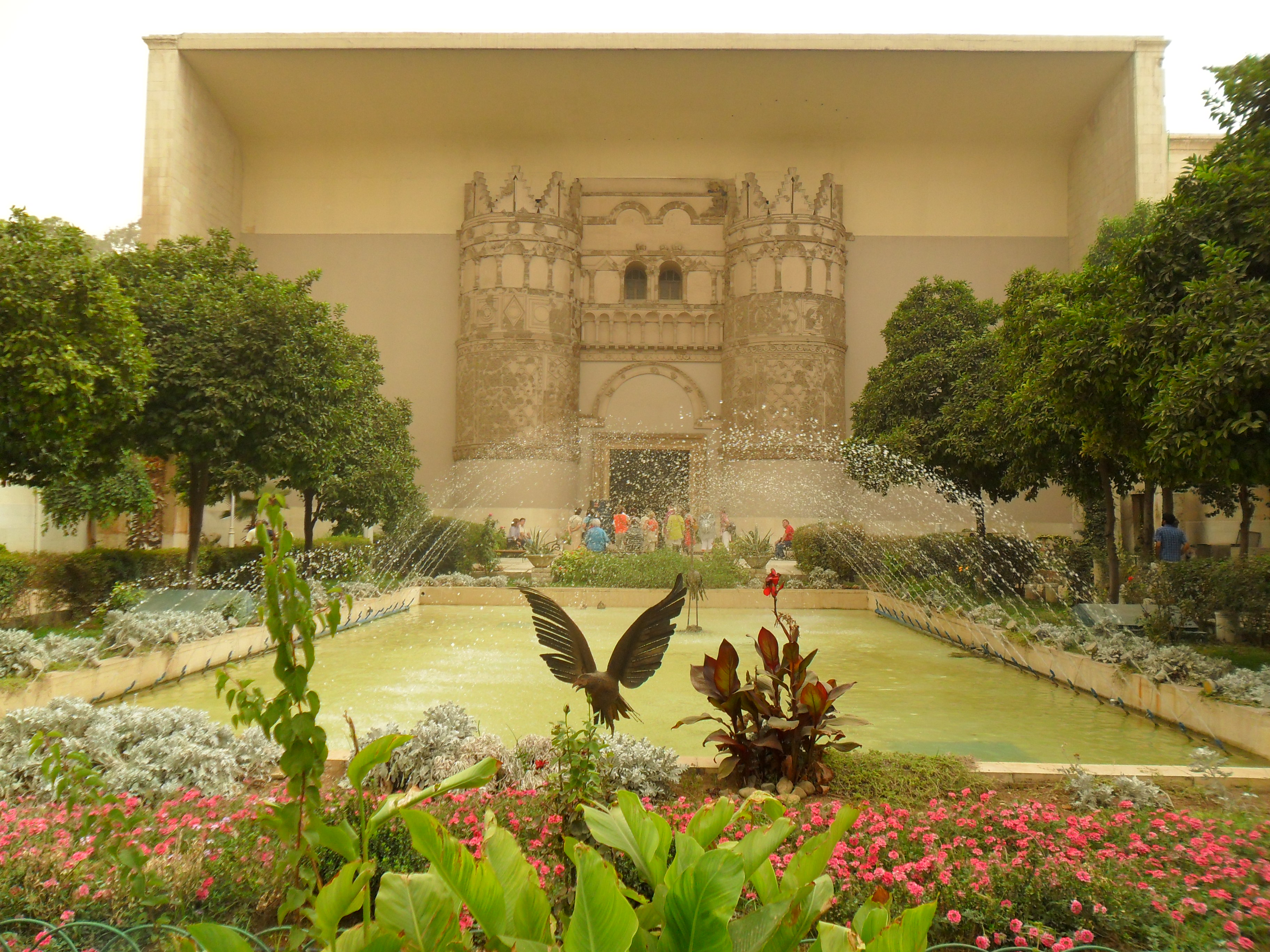
National Museum of Damascus

This is a list of museums in Syria.

- National Museum of Damascus
- National Museum of Aleppo
- National Museum of Latakia
- National Museum of Tartous
- National Museum of the Arts and Popular Traditions of Syria
- Palmyra Museum
- Deir ez-Zor Museum
- Raqqa Museum
- Homs Museum
- Idlib Museum
- Suwayda National Museum (Municipality Building)
- Ma'arrat al-Nu'man Museum (Mossaic Museum)
- Qalaat al-Madiq (Citadel)
- Arwad Museum (Citadel)
- Bosra Museum (Citadel)
- Archeological Museum of Shahba
- Apamea Museum
- Ebla Museum
- Amrit Museum
- Khan As'ad Pasha
- Azm Palace
- Azm Palace (Hama)
- Aleppo Citadel Museum
- Beit Ghazaleh (Memory Museum, Aleppo)
- Beit Achiqbash (Museum of Popular Traditions, Aleppo)
- Beit Junblatt (Aleppo)
- Al-Shibani Church
- Khanqah al-Farafira
- Maktab Anbar
- Nur al-Din Bimaristan
- Tomb of the Unknown Soldier (Damascus)
- Al-Khatt al-Arabi (Arabic Calligraphy, Damascus)
- Museum of Epigraphy (Damascus)
- Al-Bayt al-Shami (Historical museum of Damascus)
- Damascus Museum of Agriculture

== See also ==
- Culture of Syria
- List of museums
