= Shibani (surname) =

Shibani or Al-Shibani (Arabic: الشيباني) is an Arabic surname. Notable people with this surname include:

- Ahmed Shibani, an Iraqi clerical aide
- Heba Shibani, a Libyan journalist, filmmaker, and activist
- Younes Al Shibani, a Libyan footballer
- Asaad al-Shaibani, a Syrian minister

== See also ==
- Shibani (given name), an Indian feminine given name with the same spelling
