= Homs Museum =

Museum in Homs, Syria

Homs National Museum
- مُتحَفُ حِمص الوَطَنِي
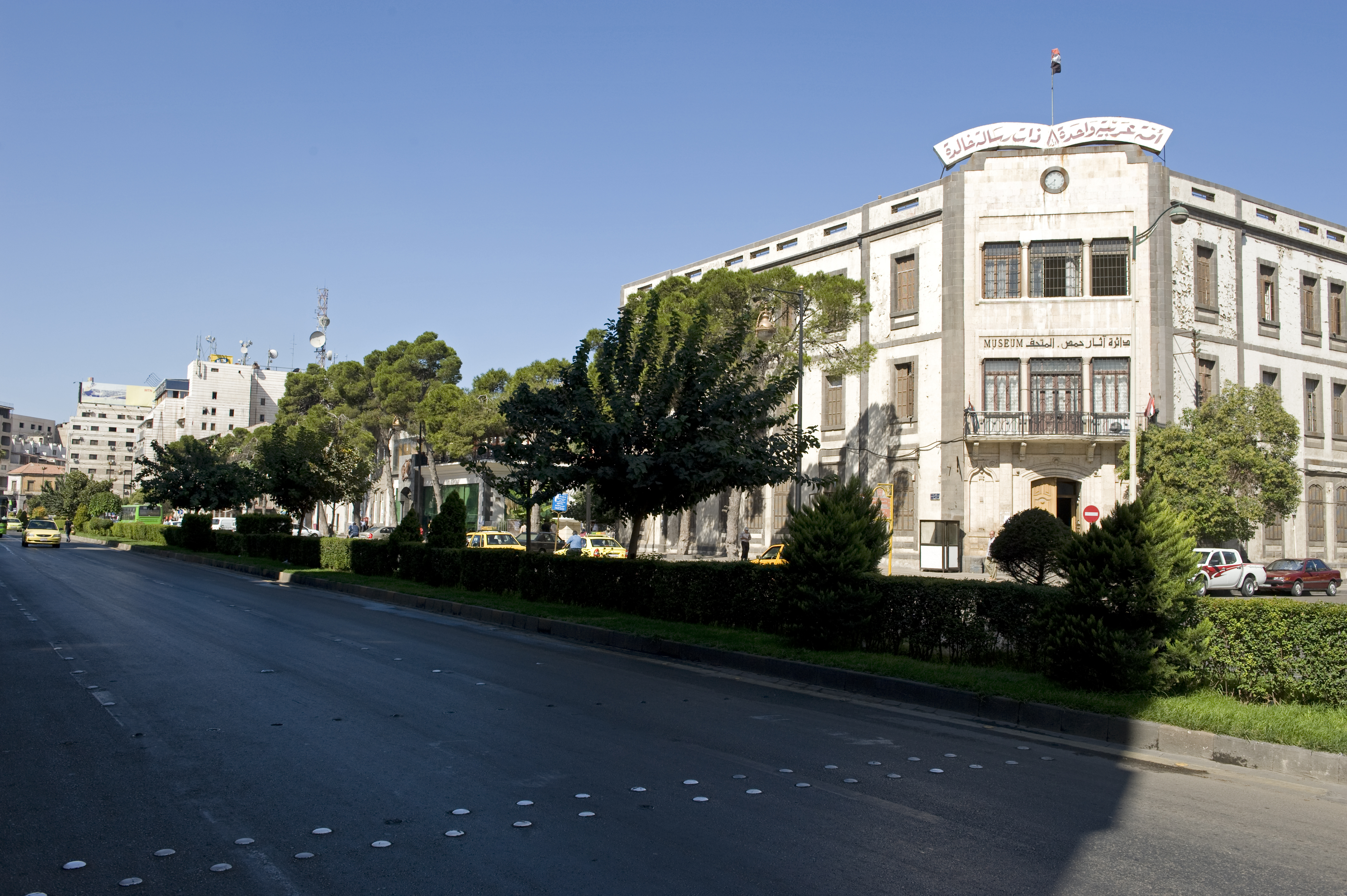
- Established: 1974
- Location: Homs, Syria
- Coordinates: 34.7318777°N 36.7113274°E
- Type: Archaeological museum

Homs Museum is an archaeological museum located in the city of Homs, Syria. It is situated on Shukri al-Quwatli Street, one of the city's main streets.

The museum is housed in a French-style building, which was constructed in three stages; The ground floor was built in 1922. The first floor was completed in 1949. The second floor was added in 1963.

The museum features a wide range of artifacts from the Homs Governorate that span from prehistoric times to the Ottoman period.

== Collection ==
The ground floor of the museum is dedicated to stone artifacts, including a marble statue that is twice the size of a human, discovered in the city of Al-Rastan, as well as mosaics, one of which depicts the Orontes River. Also displayed is an altar from a temple dedicated to the God of the Sun.

Artifacts from nearby archaeological sites around Homs include pottery and bronze vessels from the third millennium BC, such as those excavated from the mounds of Lake Qattinah and Tal Sha'irat. Other artifacts include personal weapons and a collection of bronze jewelry.

One of the most famous ancient cities represented in the museum is Qadesh, known for the famous Battle of Kadesh between the Hittites and the Pharaohs of Egypt. Qadesh also holds the distinction of being part of the first known written peace treaty in history. The city's artifacts highlight its cultural connections with the Egyptians and the Ugarit Kingdom.

The nearby Qatna Kingdom, which neighbored Homs, is represented through a collection of rare and beautiful artifacts from the Bronze Age. Archaeological excavations revealed a royal tomb filled with gifts, including items sent by the Pharaoh of Egypt.

During the Roman period, Homs was known as Emesa. The city was devastated by earthquakes and floods, which destroyed many of its important monuments. However, underground tombs have preserved artifacts from that era, including rare glass pieces and statues of Venus, the Roman goddess of beauty. The museum also displays golden jewelry and funerary items, which were used by both men and women in burial rituals, reflecting the luxurious burial customs of the time.

In the Islamic period, the city became known as Homs. Despite being severely damaged by earthquakes and floods in the 12th century, the city rose again. The museum holds pottery from this period, which showcases the craftsmanship of Islamic artisans. Some vessels are inscribed with Quranic verses and the name of Allah, highlighting the deep religious devotion of the people of that era.

== See also ==
- List of museums in Syria
