= Hala Misrati =

Libyan journalist (born 1980)

- Born: 9 September 1980 (age 46); Tripoli, Libya
- Education: University of Tripoli
- Occupations: Journalist, Writer
- Employer(s): al-Ghad Media Group (2008–2009); Libyan Jamahiriya Broadcasting Corporation (2009–2011)
- Parents: Abdelkadir Misrati (father); Hasa (mother)

Hala Misrati (Arabic: هالة المصراتي; born 9 September 1980) is a Libyan writer, television anchor and journalist. She came to wide prominence around the Arab world during the First Libyan Civil War, during which she made pro-Gaddafi government broadcasts on Libyan state television.

== Early life and education ==
Hala Misrati was born in Tripoli; she obtained a BA in law from Al Fateh University in 2003. She published a collection of short stories in 2007 entitled "The moon has another face", which a review from Middle-East-Online.com praised her "humane honesty", and described her as someone who "is angry like a child about the lies of others.". She began working in television in 2008.

== 2009 incident ==
On 24 April 2009, the quasi-independent al-Libiyya satellite television channel interview show Ain Qurb ("Up Close") was abruptly interrupted when its signal was replaced by the one from the state-run al-Jamahiriya channel. According to the WikiLeaks United States diplomatic cables leak, the show host Hala Misrati, who was hardball-style interviewing senior Revolutionary Committees member Mustafa Zaidi, was questioned by state security officers who entered the studio after the cut.

On 29 April, Misrati was interviewed in the Oea newspaper, where she downplayed the interruption of her program, saying that the individuals who questioned her were not security officers, and that their questions were benign. She blamed differences of opinion between her guest Mustafa Zaidi and other Revolutionary Committees members for the crisis, and criticized the strictures placed on journalists in Libya by reactionary regime figures.

== Rose to fame during the First Libyan Civil War ==
Misrati's pro-Gaddafi stance made her a famous TV personality during the First Libyan Civil War. Video clips of her mistakes and loyalty to Gaddafi were widely viewed on YouTube. In one famous example, Hala Misrati claimed that Muslims could not accept the UN's move to "adopt" the draft resolution authorizing NATO airstrikes over Libya because Islam prohibits adoption – of children. In her last broadcast– a day before Libyan State TV was taken over by the anti-Gaddafi rebels– Misrati brandished a pistol and vowed "You [the Libyan rebels] won't take the channel, Tripoli, or Libya! I will protect my colleagues at the [Libyan State TV] channel…we are willing to become martyrs" adding "with this weapon I either kill or die today!".

== Capture by rebels ==
On 22 August 2011, during the Battle of Tripoli, the rebels stormed the headquarters of Libyan State TV and captured Misrati. She was arrested when she was driving through Tripoli, and was taken to an office building for questioning. An armed mob of rebels tried to storm the office where she was, and they had to be dispersed by a rebel officer by firing his gun through the ceiling. The next day, Misrati appeared on a video arguing with her captors, even when they pointed their automatic rifles at her. She also appeared veiled (when she usually didn't wear a veil when she appeared on TV) on 19 February 2012 in another brief video, denying the media reports of her assassination, saying "I'm still alive, and I am still among the rebels. I was not killed and was not treated badly,"

== Release ==
In February 2012, Hala Misrati was released in Tripoli, where she had been jailed. In an interview with the Libyan resistance radio, she declared that the armed militias were controlling the country, and not the National Transitional Council and that the pro-Gaddafi resistance was still fighting. Finally, she revealed that the Gaddafi government forces had 23 battalions during the war, while the rebels had more than 100.

As of 2018, she is living in Uganda. She had also spent time in Tunisia and is planning to write her memoir.

== See also ==
- Moussa Ibrahim
