= Idlib Museum =

Museum in Idlib, Syria

- مُتْحَفُ إدلِب
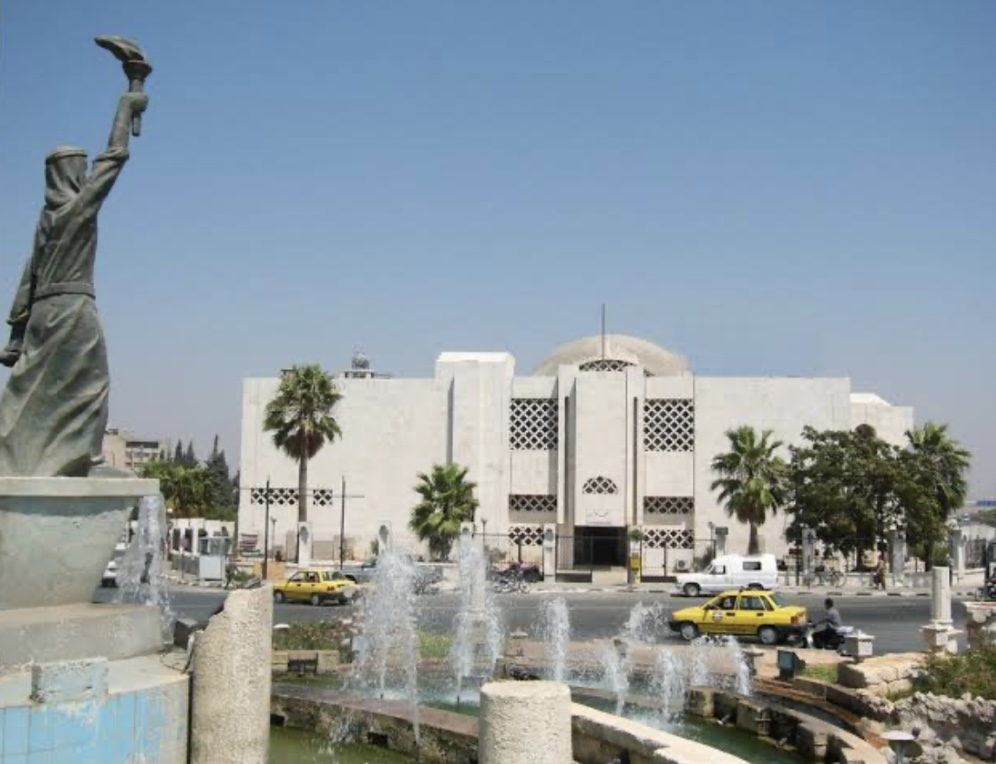
- Established: 1989
- Location: Idlib, Syria
- Coordinates: 35°55′58.35″N 36°38′31.12″E
- Type: Archaeological Museum

Idlib Museum (Arabic: متحف إدلب) is an archaeological museum located in the city of Idlib (Note: Also spelled Idleb or Edlib) in northwestern Syria.

The museum was founded in 1989 and holds a significant collection of artifacts, most notably the clay tablets from what the museum calls the Royal Archive of Ebla, carefully preserved for study, and they have reshaped much of what is known about the ancient Near East.

== Collection highlights ==
Idlib Museum preserves a collection from the ancient city of Ebla, located near Saraqib, a kingdom that thrived thousands of years ago. Among the artifacts are basalt steles, pottery jars, mosaics, and clay figurines. The museum also holds a collection of Islamic artifacts, in addition to artifacts from the Roman and Byzantine periods.

The most notable items in the museum are the cuneiform tablets, often referred to as the Ebla Royal Archives. These tablets, discovered in 1964 by an Italian archaeological mission led by Paolo Matthiae, have revealed significant historical data dating back to 5000 BC. The museum also houses a wide range of items from Syria's ancient history, including 12,000-year-old artifacts.

== War damage and preservation ==
The museum first closed in 2013 due to the escalation of the Syrian civil war, during which it suffered from looting and bombings. Despite this, opposition groups reopened the museum in 2018, supervised by a local civilian group called the Idlib Antiquities Center, which restored two galleries for visitors.

Idlib Museum has endured substantial damage during the conflict. It was directly hit by shelling in 2015 and again in 2017, causing significant structural damage. Further harm occurred from the aftermath of the 2023 Turkey–Syria earthquakes, leading to cracks in the museum's walls.

== Current challenges ==
The museum remains open but struggles with a lack of support and the absence of tourists due to ongoing instability. Local visitors, including school and university students, are the primary audience. Efforts continue to raise awareness of the museum's importance and advocate for increased protection and restoration of Syria's cultural heritage.

== Sell also ==
- List of museums in Syria
