= Libya Al Jadida =

Newspaper in Libya

- Type: Daily
- Format: Online newspaper
- Founder: Mahmoud Al Misrati
- Publisher: Faisal Swehli and Osama Swed
- Editor-in-chief: Mahmoud Al Misrati
- Founded: 22 August 2012; 13 years ago
- Political alignment: Independent
- Language: Arabic
- Headquarters: Tripoli, Libya
- Website: Libya Al Jadida

Libya Al Jadida (Arabic: ليبيا الجديدة; The New Libya) is a daily newspaper based in Tripoli, Libya. It was launched in Tunis during the Libyan Civil War.

== History and profile ==
Libya Al Jadida was founded by Mahmoud Al Misrati as an online newspaper in Tunis where he fled during the Libyan Civil War that toppled Muammar Gaddafi in 2011. The publishers of the paper are Faisal Swehli and Osama Swed. Following the foundation of the new regime in Libya the paper was headquartered in Tripoli and was launched as a weekly on 22 August 2012. Later the paper was relaunched as daily.

In 2012, the paper had a circulation of 7,500 copies.

As of 2013 Mahmoud Al Misrati was the editor-in-chief of the paper. Although the paper has full-time staff, freelance journalists also contribute to it.

== Political stance ==
Libya Al Jadida is one of a few independent papers in Libya in that it does not represent and have affiliation with any political interest groups and parties.

== See also ==
- List of newspapers in Libya
