= Suwayda National Museum =

Museum in Suwayda, Syria

- مُتحَفُ السُّوَيدَاء الوَطَني
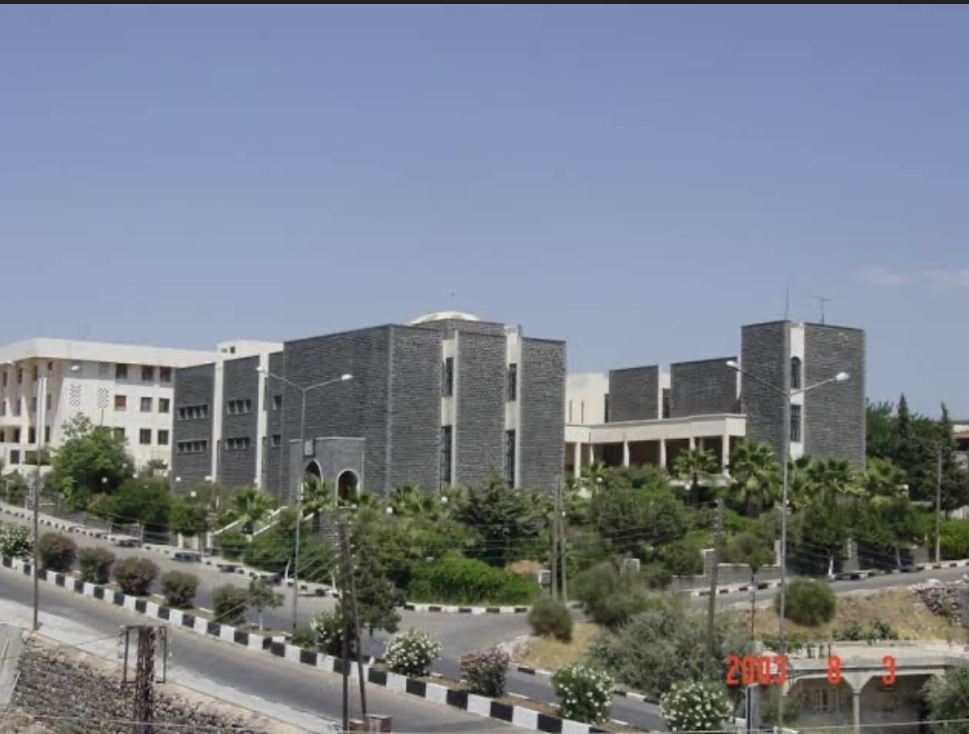
- Location: Suwayda, Syria
- Coordinates: 32.7211598°N 36.5805144°E

Suwayda National Museum (Arabic: متحف السويداء الوطني) is located in the city of Suwayda in southern Syria.

It showcases the history of the region, known for its unique volcanic basalt landscape, through a diverse collection of historical artifacts. The museum stands as a prominent example of Syria's rich heritage and is recognized for its architecture, crafted from local black basalt, which reflects the area's volcanic nature. The surrounding gardens act as an open-air museum, featuring additional archaeological elements.

== History ==
The origins of the museum date back to 1923-1925 when the collection began in an outdoor display on the southern side of the current government seat building. Initially, the collection was modest, but over the years, it expanded as local people from Jabal al-Arab contributed basalt sculptures and archaeological discoveries. Significant items were also moved to the museum after the discovery of ancient mosaics in nearby Shahba. During the French Mandate, the museum was housed in a cinema hall adjacent to the government building, until the need arose for a dedicated space. In 1990, a new building for the museum was inaugurated.

== Architecture and Design ==
The museum covers a total area of 4,650 m^{2}, including a basement and two floors. Its exterior is clad in local basalt stone, which complements the volcanic nature of the region. The museum's central hall is illuminated naturally by a fiberglass dome. Surrounding the building, the garden space of 3,650 m^{2} forms a complementary outdoor museum.

== Collection ==
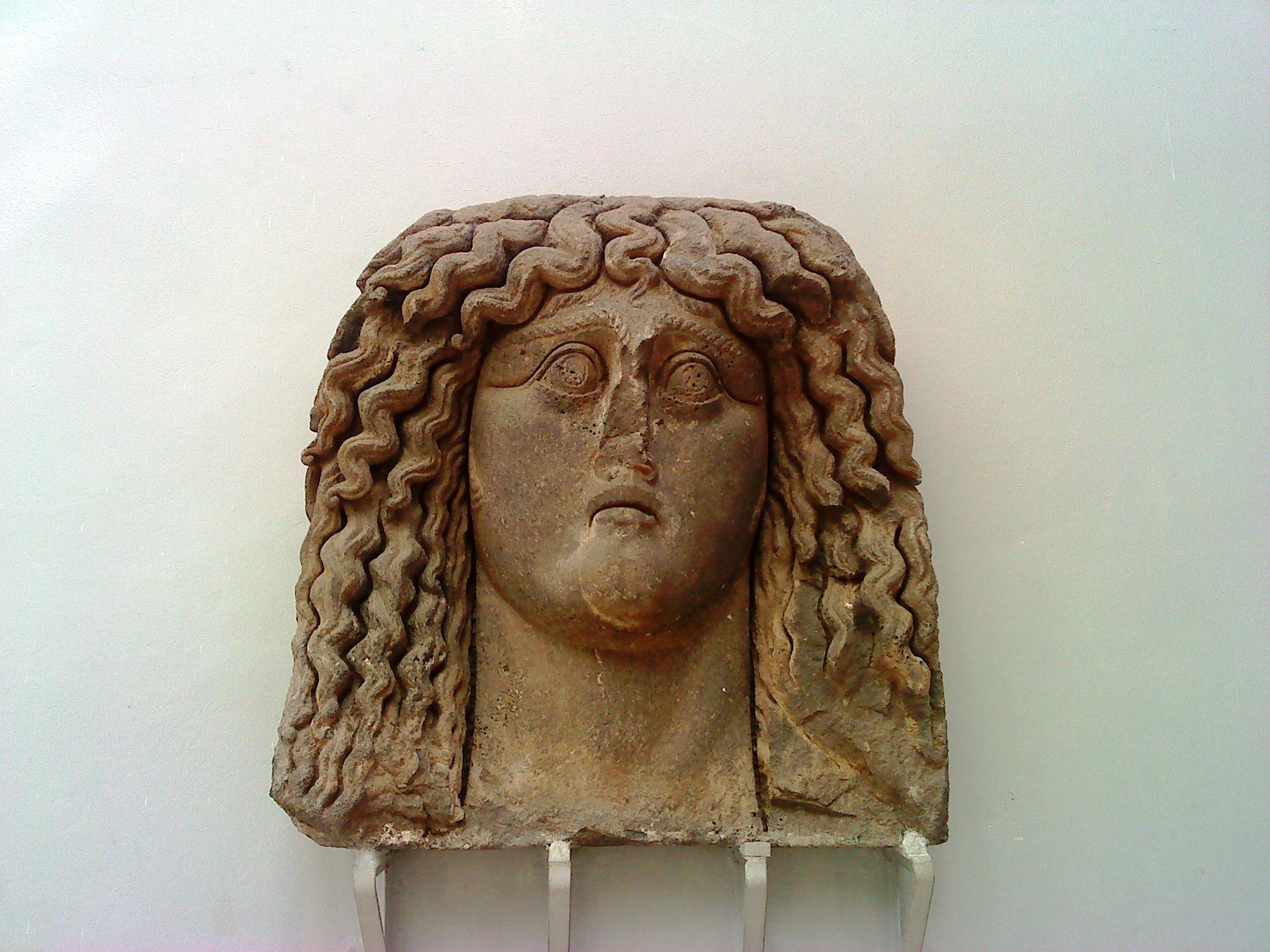

The museum's collection consists primarily of basalt stone sculptures, ancient stone tools, mosaics, pottery, glassware, jewelry, and coins dating back to the Nabataean, Roman, Byzantine, and Islamic periods. A highlight of the museum is its collection of mosaics depicting mythological Greek scenes, as well as its gold, bronze, and copper coin collections.

== See also ==
- List of museums in Syria
