= Mohammed Nabbous =

Libyan journalist

Mohamed Nabbous محمد نبوس
- Born: 27 February 1983; Benghazi, Libya
- Died: 19 March 2011 (aged 28); Benghazi, Libya
- Cause of death: Gunshot wound
- Education: Garyounis University
- Occupations: Journalist, Founder: Libya Alhurra TV
- Spouse: Samra Naas aka "Perditta"
- Children: Mayar "Maya" (b. June 2, 2011)

Mohamed "Mo" Nabbous (محمد نبوس; 27 February 1983 – 19 March 2011) was a Libyan information technologist, blogger, businessperson and civilian journalist who created and founded Libya Alhurra TV.

At the outbreak of the Libyan Civil War, Nabbous was the founder of Libya Alhurra TV, the first independent broadcast news organization since Gaddafi took power in Libya. Libya Alhurra TV was established in Benghazi, Libya on 19 February 2011 and started broadcasting online when Nabbous established a two-way satellite connection in the wake of a complete Internet blackout imposed by the Gaddafi government after the 17 February protests.

Nabbous was shot by a sniper and killed on 19 March 2011 while reporting on attempts by government forces to fight revolutionaries and attack civilians in Benghazi. Hours after the death of Nabbous, international coalition airplanes entered Libyan airspace to enforce a no-fly zone authorized by United Nations Security Council Resolution 1973. In the last weeks of his life, Nabbous focused on bringing international attention to the humanitarian crisis unfolding in Libya. His death was widely reported by CNN and various media outlets. Prior to the establishment of Libya Alhurra TV, Nabbous operated a number of businesses in Benghazi city.

== Background ==
Born in Benghazi in 1983, Nabbous graduated from Garyounis University, with a degree in Mathematics.

A member of Nabbous' family, aged 17, was cited as one of the first casualties of the 17 February protests in Benghazi. Nabbous' wife, Samra Naas, was pregnant with the couple's first child at the time of his death. On 2 June 2011, Naas gave birth to a baby girl who was given the name Mayar "Maya" Nabbous.

In an interview with Canal+ France on February 26, 2011 Nabbous said he was running a wireless ISP business in Benghazi in the 2000s with five WLAN access points, but was forced out of the business by competition from government sponsored broadband services using ADSL and Wimax technologies.

== Work in media ==
NPR social media strategist Andy Carvin called Nabbous "the face of Libyan citizen journalism;" Nabbous was the primary contact of many international media outlets looking for information regarding the situation in Libya. Nabbous founded and ran the Internet division of Libya Alhurra TV. Der Spiegel reporter Clemens Höges called Nabbous "the man who just might be the most important person in the revolution."

Libya Alhurra TV was the only broadcast coming out of Benghazi when Muammar Gaddafi shut down Internet lines when the Libyan Civil War began.

=== Work with Libya Alhurra TV ===
Libya Alhurra TV included nine cameras streaming 24 hours a day since the channel's creation on 17 February. As Libya Alhurra TV's communications became more sophisticated, Nabbous was able to take cameras with him to different parts of Benghazi in order to capture the destruction and carnage caused by mortars and shelling up-close.

Over the last few days and hours of his life, Nabbous continued reporting. Streaming over Libya Alhurra TV, Nabbous was able to share live video and provide commentary regarding the bombing of a Benghazi power station and a fuel tank explosion on 17 March, the firing of missiles on Benghazi from nearby city Sultan on 18 March, the attacks on civilians and consequent destruction in the morning of 19 March, and the death of two young victims: 4 month-old and 5 year-old children killed in their bedroom by a missile launched in the morning of 19 March. These images and reports were broadcast over the Internet, and later rebroadcast by international media outlets such as Al Jazeera English.

== Death ==
Nabbous was killed while reporting on the claims of a cease-fire made by the Gaddafi government in response to United Nations Security Council Resolution 1973. Nabbous was allegedly shot in the head by a sniper soon after covering the Gaddafi's government cease-fire declaration; sitting in the back of a truck, he was using a mobile phone to record audio of the then-ongoing violence, and the audio recording cut off at the estimated time of the shooting. Nabbous was in critical condition until he died around 3 p.m. CET. Nabbous' wife announced his death in a video on Libya Alhurra TV.

=== Reactions ===
News of Nabbous' death elicited reactions from members of journalistic organizations and personalities:

- "He touched the hearts of many with his bravery and indomitable spirit. He will be dearly missed and leaves behind his young wife and unborn child", said Sharon Lynch, Libya Alhurra TV station representative and colleague of Nabbous.
- Bilal Randeree, journalist for Al Jazeera
- Don Lemon, CNN reporter who interviewed Nabbous on 19 February and Arwa Damon, CNN correspondent based in Benghazi, paid tribute to Nabbous on 20 March. He was billed as a CNN contributor, and had interviewed Ben Wedeman on 26 February.
- Ben Wedeman, CNN reporter tweeted on 19 March: "Mohammed Nabbous was one of the courageous voices from Benghazi broadcasting to the world from the beginning. Smart, selfless, brave."
- Andy Carvin, NPR's senior product manager for online communities: "[A]ll of a sudden, as Benghazi was trying to free itself from Gadhafi, you started hearing voices coming over the Internet and one of those first voices to come out was Mo"...Nabbous, Andy says, used Libya Alhurra TV to become "their local equivalent of Radio Free Europe or Voice of America, where he was trying to get the world to hear their point of view of what was going on. And as he did that, he basically became a reporter or even an anchor."
- UNESCO Director-General Irina Bokova: "I condemn the killing of Mohammed al-Nabbous [sic], who was killed while fulfilling his professional duty of informing citizens about the dramatic events taking place in Libya".
- Committee to Protect Journalists (CPJ) Abdel Dayem: "We send our condolences to the family and friends of our colleague Mohammad al-Nabbous [sic]."
- International Press Institute (IPI) Press Freedom Manager Anthony Mills: "Our condolences go out to the wife, family, and colleagues of Mohammed al-Nabous [sic]."

== Legacy ==
Nabbous was perceived as the face and voice of the Libyan revolution and was one of the first people to be interviewed by western journalists soon after Benghazi was liberated by Libyan opposition forces. The Guardian described Nabbous as the "face of citizen journalism" in Libya.

In December, 2011, the Nieman Foundation at Harvard University posthumously awarded Mohammed Nabbous the Louis Lyons Award for Conscience and Integrity in Journalism. The award was given to Nabbous' wife, Samra, at a ceremony at the Lippmann House in Cambridge on December 1, 2011.
