= The Libya Observer =

Online newspaper based in Libya

- Type: Daily
- Format: Online newspaper
- Editor-in-chief: Abdullah Ibrahim
- Founded: July 2015
- Language: English, Arabic
- Headquarters: Tripoli, Libya
- Website: libyaobserver.ly, ar.libyaobserver.ly

The Libya Observer (Arabic: ليبيا أوبزرفر) is an English and Arabic online newspaper based in Tripoli, Libya, created in 2015.

== History ==
The Libya Observer claims to have evolved from online social media news articles, first published in April 2014, into a more conventional online newspaper in July 2015. The chief editor is Abdullah Ibrahim.

== Influence ==
Freedom House used articles by Libya Observer as a major source of information on Libyan Internet freedom in 2018.

== See also ==
- List of newspapers in Libya
