= Al Urubah =

Al Urubah was a pro-Muammar Gaddafi Libyan television station. Following the fall of Tripoli in August, 2011, it broadcast messages from the deposed leader and his information minister, Moussa Ibrahim. The station's logo also temporarily appeared on Syria's Arrai TV Television's transmissions. The owner of Arrai TV, Iraqi expatriate businessman Mish'an al-Juburi, described Al Urubah as "the sister of Arrai TV channel", but also stated that it broadcast from an undisclosed Arab state other than Syria. The station has been off the air since late August 2011.
