= Jamahiriya News Agency =

Official state news agency of Libya 1964-2011

- Company type: News agency
- Predecessor: Libyan News Agency
- Founded: 1964; 61 years ago
- Defunct: August 2011; 14 years ago
- Fate: Dissolved
- Headquarters: Libya
- Products: News stories
- Owner: State of Libya
- Number of employees: 300

The Libyan News Agency (Arabic: وكالة الأنباء الليبية), also known as LANA (Arabic: وال), was the official state news agency of the State of Libya.

It was founded in 1964 as the Libyan News Agency by a royal decree, amended in 1970 after the 1969 coup d'état and fall of the Kingdom of Libya and changed its name to Al-Jamaherya News Agency (JANA) (Arabic: وكالة الجماهيرية للأنباء (أوج)). It was taken off the air during the Battle of Tripoli in August 2011, as rebel forces overran the capital.

Under Muammar Gaddafi's government, the agency was the only authorised distributor of foreign news and most domestic news in the country. It also routinely reported on Gaddafi and his family.

The Libyan News Agency (LANA) had a number of agreements with Arab, African and international news agencies. It had over 300 staff and 10 overseas bureaus in London, Rome, Paris, Valletta, Tunis, Cairo, Rabat and Damascus. The agency also maintained domestic offices and correspondents in provincial councils linked to the head office in Tripoli.

== See also ==
- Mathaba News Agency
- Media of Libya
- Communications in Libya
