= Libya Al Ahrar TV =

Libyan television channel

Libya-Al-Ahrar ليبيا الأحرار
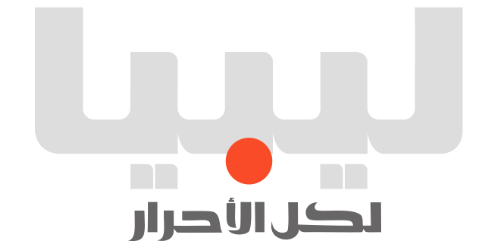
- Country: Libya
- Broadcast area: Worldwide
- Headquarters: Doha, Qatar

Programming
- Language: Arabic

History
- Launched: March 2011

Links
- Website: https://libyaalahrar.tv/

Libya Al Ahrar (Arabic: ليبيا الأحرار) (formerly Libya TV) is a Libyan television channel broadcast by satellite from its headquarters in Doha. The channel was created in 2011 during the Libyan Civil War. It presents news, opinions, analysis, photo and video reports about Libya in specific and the region in a wider scope. It focuses on Libya's revolution and future toward building a democratic state.

== Structure ==
Libya TV was founded by Libyans led by Mahmud Shammam and Mohamad A. Al Akari. With the full support of the Libyan PM, Dr. Mahmmud Jebrel, who helped to bring the full support from the Qatari government. Mohamad A. Al Akari was the first General Manager, Serage Beshti was the Head of Administration and one of the first founders, and Huda Al Srari was Head of PR. Currently, it has around 50 employees working to provide exposure to Libyans different opinions. Huda Alsrari was named to be head of the Doha operation later 2013 and held this position till mid of 2014 before she had to resign with Mahmoud Shamam.

The headquarters is in Doha, and additional studios are located in Benghazi and Tripoli. Libya TV claims to have correspondents "throughout Libya." Along with Arabic, the channel also broadcasts a show in the Tamazight language and will contain English programming in the future.

== Funding ==
Libya TV is mostly funded by Libyan expatriate businessmen. Qatar provides "facilities and technical staff" through the Alrayyan TV station.

== Notable broadcasts ==
Libya TV's plan for April 2011 was to broadcast four hours of original programs, including a news segment and a talk show, daily. Libya TV now broadcasts 12 hours per day both in Arabic and the Tamazight language.

In the weeks prior to the battle of Tripoli, Libya TV aired recorded phone calls between key figures in the Gaddafi regime in which they discussed moving bodies of the deceased to places where NATO had previously targeted during airstrikes.

On 21 August 2011, amidst the Battle of Tripoli, then- Prime Minister Mahmoud Jibril gave a speech on Libya TV urging revolutionary fighters against looting, revenge killings, abusing foreign nationals and mistreating prisoners of war. He also called for unity and asked that police and army units in Tripoli disavow Gaddafi but remain at their posts.

On 20 October 2011, Libya TV was the first news channel to report the capture and subsequent death of Muammar Gaddafi.

== See also ==
- Libyan Jamahiriya Broadcasting Corporation
- Media of Libya
- Free speech in the media during the 2011 Libyan civil war
- Heba Shibani
