= Libya Alhurra TV =

Internet television channel

- Type: Online streaming via Livestream LLC
- Country: Libya
- First air date: 19 February 2011
- Availability: Libya
- Headquarters: Benghazi, Libya (from February 2011)
- Launch date: 19 February 2011
- Official website: livestream.com/libya17feb
- Language: Arabic and English

Libya Alhurra TV (Arabic: قناة ليبيا الحرة), meaning Free Libya TV, is an Internet television channel founded by Mohamed Nabbous on 19 February 2011 at the start of the Libyan Civil War. It was the first private television station in Benghazi, in the east of the country.

The channel's purpose is to provide the world with news and exclusive on-ground footage from Benghazi during the civil war.

Libya Alhurra TV was the only TV broadcast from Benghazi when Muammar Gaddafi shut down Internet lines as the war began. (A rebel-controlled radio station, Voice of Free Libya, was also broadcasting from Benghazi at that time.) Alhurra TV was able to bypass government blocks on the Internet in order to broadcast live images from Benghazi across the world.

On 19 March 2011, Nabbous was killed by pro-Gaddafi troops during the Second Battle of Benghazi. His wife Samra Naas announced his death on the same day and vowed to continue with the channel in his stead. Along with a remaining team member, the channel obtained, produced and broadcast original contributions of raw footage from pro-opposition individuals both inside and outside the country.
