= Quwatli Street (Homs) =

Street in Homs, Syria

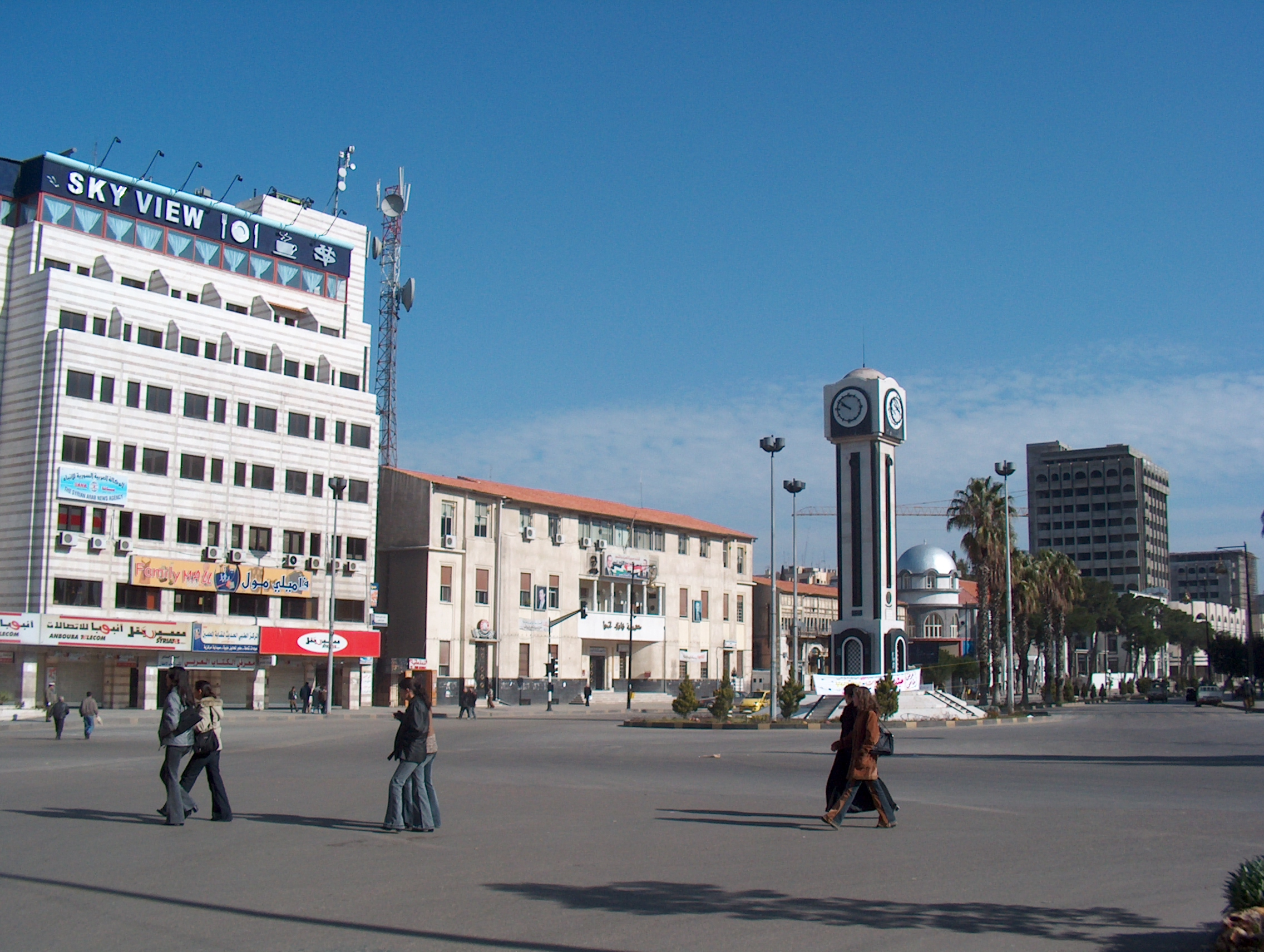
- Quwatli Square, western end of Quwatli Street, with the New Clock Tower
- Native name: شارع القوتلي (Arabic)
- Length: 400 m (1,300 ft)
- Location: Homs, Syria
- Coordinates: 34.73115°N 36.70944°E

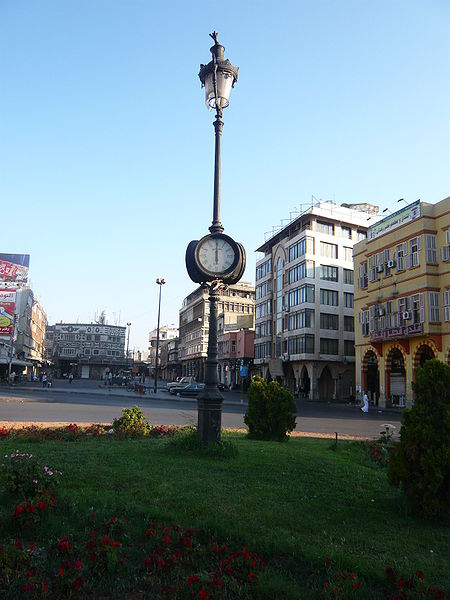
Martyrs' Square, eastern end of Quwatli Street, with the Old Clock

Shoukri al-Quwatly Street or simply Quwatly Street (Arabic: شارع القوتلي) is the main street of central Homs, Syria. The street is a short, but wide strip of road with a large roundabout at both ends. Central Homs lies on either side of Quwatli Street, named after former Syrian president Shukri al-Quwatli. At its eastern end is the Great Mosque of al-Nuri and Martyrs' Square where the Old Clock of Homs stands, while the New Clock Tower is located at its western end. Much of the street itself is lined with buildings for accommodation, low-price hotels, eateries, coffeehouses, and other venues, as well as the city museum.

== Bibliography ==
- Carter, Terry; Dunston, Lara; Humphreys, Andrew (2004), Syria & Lebanon, Lonely Planet, ISBN 9781864503333
