= Shibani (given name) =

Shibani is an Indian feminine given name. Notable people with this name include:

- Shibani Bathija, an Indian screenwriter
- Shibani Dandekar (born 1980), an Indian singer, actress, host, and model
- Shibani Kashyap, an Indian singer

== See also ==
- Shibani (surname), an Arabic surname with the same spelling
