= Heba Shibani =

Libyan war correspondent, film producer and women's rights activist

- Citizenship: Libya
- Occupations: Journalist, Photographer, Filmmaker

Heba Shibani is a Libyan war correspondent, film producer and women's rights activist.

== Career ==
Shibani has worked for a variety of news outlets, including Reuters, Libya TV, Alassema TV, and Alnabaa News TV. For Alhan Libiyya, she produced the series Lahni, which explores the diversity of music in Libya. She has produced television programmes on women's rights in Libya. She reported on the situation some Libyan women were facing, where their children were due to be deported, since Libyan law did not allow women to pass their citizenship to their children. She was forced to flee Libya in 2014, due to her journalism. She is one of nineteen women reporters whose essays on their work were published in 2019 in the volume Our Women on the Ground.
