= Libyan Times =

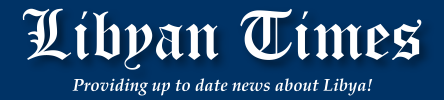
- Type: Daily newspaper and news-blog
- Format: news
- Editor: George S. Hishmeh
- Staff writers: 12
- Founded: newspaper in 1967–2011 daily newsletter
- Political alignment: Independent

The Libyan Times was a Washington-based Libyan independent newspaper founded in Benghazi, Libya in 1967 by George S. Hishmeh. The same name under which a news blog operates launching from the same city started working in 2006 by a group of Libyan computer and web development engineers led by Libyan Project Management Specialist Abdelsalam Eljaroshi.

== History ==
The Libyan Times covered Libyan affairs and news events and was published in several English-speaking countries, of which United States, Canada, UK, and Australia.

The blog was planned to operate starting on the date of its launch in mid-2006, but the publishing of international media mentioning of Libya was delayed until December of the same year.

== News feedback ==
The founding editor George Hishmeh writes for a number of well-known newspapers such as Gulf News Dubai, The Daily Star Beirut, The Jordan Times, Chicago Sun-Times, and the Washington Post, and he was successful to run one of the best local extensions to the Times name.

The main source of news for the news blog was international media that covers any events related to Libya, with a This Day In History, and facts about Libya.

== Battle of recognition ==
In June 2009 local news follower Quryna decided to run an English version of its paper, and despite the existence of Libyan Times, Quryna decided to run it with the same name. Though Quryna itself is 2 years younger than the original news-blog, the proper contribution was not accepted from the original name holders.

In addition to the fault name take-over, Quryna ignored a long time newspaper: The Libyan Times, which has been holding the name since first founding.
