= Ben Wedeman =

American journalist (born 1960)

- Born: Benjamin C. Wedeman; September 1, 1960 (age 65)
- Education: B.A. University of Texas at Austin; M.A. University of London
- Occupations: Journalist; War correspondent
- Parent(s): Martha Jean Hall Wedeman; Miles G. Wedeman

Benjamin C. Wedeman (born September 1, 1960) is an American journalist and war correspondent. He is a CNN senior international correspondent based in Rome. He has been with the network since 1994 and has earned multiple Emmy Awards and Edward R. Murrow Awards for team reporting.

== Early life and family ==
Wedeman's father, Miles G. Wedeman (January 23, 1923 – October 23, 2013), was a diplomat and civil servant from Pennsylvania. He was a devout Quaker. His mother, Martha Jean (née Hall) Wedeman was a reporter for The Washington Post.

Wedeman spent most of his childhood outside the United States, after having moved with his family to South Korea in 1968. Subsequently, the family moved to Bangkok and Phnom Penh, Cambodia (during the Cambodian Civil War). His father also served in Ivory Coast and Syria working for USAID.

Wedeman attended boarding schools in Beirut, Lebanon (in 1974–1975, just as the civil war broke out); Tangier, Morocco; and Windsor, Connecticut. He graduated from the University of Texas at Austin with a bachelor's degree in Asiatic Languages and Linguistics in 1982 and from the University of London's School of Oriental and African Studies with a master's degree in Middle Eastern Studies.

== Career ==
From 1988 to 1992, Wedeman was based in Aleppo, Syria, and worked as a communications specialist for the International Center for Agricultural Research in the Dry Areas.

Wedeman was originally hired by CNN as a local Jordanian employee in 1994 as a "fixer/producer/sound technician". One of his duties was to help reporting staff get through checkpoints since he is fluent in multiple dialects of Arabic. He was eventually appointed as CNN's Bureau Chief in Amman.

From 1998 to 2006, Wedeman was CNN's bureau chief in Cairo, where he led CNN's coverage of the uprising against then-President Hosni Mubarak as well as the wider unrest in the Middle East. In 2009, CNN appointed Wedeman as the Jerusalem bureau's correspondent.

In October 2000, Wedeman was shot in the back while covering a clash between Palestinians and Israelis near the Karni border crossing between Gaza and Israel.

In August 2011, Wedeman was in Sabah, Libya, covering the 2011 civil war that overthrew Muammar Gaddafi. Pursuing a lead which led him to an abandoned warehouse, he discovered thousands of barrels containing bags of a yellow powder labeled as radioactive. It was later confirmed by the IAEA that this powder was Yellowcake uranium.

Following the September 11 attacks, Wedeman was one of the first journalists to gain access to Iraq prior to the Iraq War. He was the only Western journalist granted access for an interview with Uday Hussein.

In August 2012, he was in Aleppo, Syria, covering a battle of the civil war.

Outside of the Middle East, Wedeman has traveled to war zones in Afghanistan, the Balkans, and Africa. In 2022 and 2023, he reported for CNN in Ukraine war zones.

Since 2023, Wedeman is a recurrent guest of Che tempo che fa, a talk show aired on Italian TV channel NOVE, owned by Warner Bros Discovery.

== Awards ==
- With his team, Wedeman won the 1996 Overseas Press Club's Edward R. Murrow Award for Best TV interpretation or documentary on foreign affairs for the network's coverage of Jordan's relationship with Israel after their peace treaty, as well as for its coverage of Iraq under Saddam Hussein.
- He led the team that won an Emmy award for its 2000 coverage of the civil war in Sierra Leone. This coverage also earned him an Edward R. Murrow award.
- His team won the RTNDA Edward R. Murrow Award for its coverage of the 2006 Lebanon War, where they stayed in Lebanon, documenting the experience of the Lebanese people.
- In 2010, he won the Outstanding Contribution to Broadcasting Award at the sixth annual International Media Awards in London, hosted by the International Council for Press and Broadcasting
- In 2012, his team won an Emmy Award for Outstanding Live Coverage of a Current News Story – Long Form for his reporting in "Breaking News Simulcast of Revolution in Egypt - President Mubarak Steps Down"
