= Ahmed Shibani =

Iraqi Shia clerical advisor

Ahmed Shibani is a senior aide to radical Shia cleric Muqtada al-Sadr, whose political movement plays a key role in Iraq's power-sharing coalition.

Mr Shibani met Nouri Maliki hours after Iraqi government officials said they were talking with insurgent groups.

The US-led coalition said Shibani could help moderate extremism in Iraq.

In a statement, the coalition said leaders judged that Mr Shibani "could play a potentially important role in helping to moderate extremism and foster reconciliation in Iraq."

The United States military jailed Shibani at a military prison more than two years ago after detaining him during an uprising against the occupation in the Shia town of Najaf.
