= Voice of Free Libya =

Name used by three radio stations aligned to the anti-Gaddafi forces

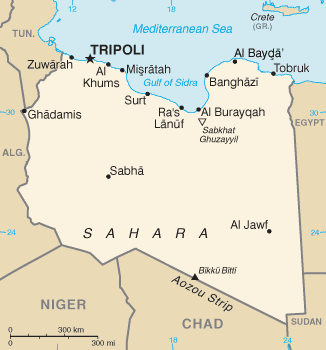
- Broadcast Location 2011
- Formation: February–March 2011
- Purpose: Anti-Gaddafi Broadcast Media
- Location(s): Benghazi, Bayda, Misrata and Tobruk, Libya
- Official language: Arabic

Voice of Free Libya (Arabic: صوت ليبيا الحرة Sawt Libya al-Hurra) is the name used by three radio stations aligned to the anti-Gaddafi forces that began broadcasting in February 2011, operating from the cities of Benghazi, Bayda and Misrata. They played an important role in the Libyan Civil War and have continued to broadcast after the fall of Gaddafi.

During the Libyan Civil War, other rebel-controlled radio stations were reported to be operating in Tobruk, Nalut, Jadu, Libya, Derna and Zliten.

In many cases - and certainly for the stations in Benghazi, Bayda and Misrata - they used captured transmitters formerly run by the Libyan state broadcasting organisation.

Output was in Arabic, with the Nalut station also said to have used Berber (Tamazight). The outlets operated independently and with separate programing, although they shared similar aims. They all carried material strongly supportive of the rebels and firmly critical of Gaddafi.

== Names ==
The stations were heard using the name Radio Free Libya (Arabic: Idha'at Libya al-Hurra) in addition to Voice of Free Libya, but the latter identification was the one most commonly used by Benghazi and Bayda.

Reporting of the stations' names was imprecise. Some English-language media reports referred to "Radio Free Libya", "Free Radio Libya", "Free Libya Radio" and other names, sometimes even in the same article. Others referred to "Radio Free Benghazi" and "Radio Free Misrata" as shorthand names, rather than a full citation of the station identifications as announced on-air. Another variant seen in English-language reporting was "Misrata's Radio Freedom Voice".

== Launch history ==
Following the start of the Libyan uprising on 15–17 February 2011, DX radio enthusiasts outside Libya watched the frequencies of the country's transmitters for any unusual behaviour. The Bayda station was first heard by an enthusiast during the night of 20–21 February. The following night it was heard carrying material in English, including an appeal to US President Barack Obama and Secretary of State Hillary Clinton.

A press report said the Benghazi station began broadcasting at 2 p.m. local time on 21 February and it was confirmed by radio enthusiasts to be on the air later the same day.

A press report in late April 2011 said the Misrata station began broadcasting on 21 February. A report in late February 2011 had spoken of a rebel-controlled radio station operating in Misrata. At that time, the station is assumed to have been on FM only as Misrata's AM transmissions were not confirmed until 18 March, carrying continuous religious chants; voice programing was first heard on 21 March.

A journalist working for the Misrata station, Muhammad Ali al-Ma'dani, was killed on 28 May 2011 by a mortar fired by Gaddafi forces.

== Transmitters, frequencies, internet streams and websites ==
The Benghazi station transmits on 675 AM (medium wave), Bayda on 1125 AM and Misrata on 1449 AM. The output powers of the three transmitters are substantial - 100 kilowatts (kW), 500 kW and 500 kW respectively - but variable reception indicated that they may sometimes have operated on reduced power.

Speculation that Benghazi's AM transmitter was one formerly used by 1970s offshore pirate station Radio North Sea International (Radio Nordsee International), RNI, has not been confirmed. The speculation arose because RNI's ship, Mebo II, and its transmitters were sold to Libya in 1977 and were used for broadcasting there for a few years. The transmitters' subsequent fate is unknown. (Note: A further Libyan connection with RNI arose when a timing device made by Mebo II's original owners, the Swiss electronics firm Mebo Telecommunications, was alleged to have been used to trigger the 1988 Lockerbie bomb.)

Benghazi also reportedly transmitted on FM, differing sources giving the frequencies as 88.9 and 89.9, 88.8 and 98.9, 89.3 and 98.8, or 98.9.

The Benghazi station used an improvised studio at its transmitting station, as its studio headquarters were burnt down by protesters in the early days of the revolution.

None of the stations operated a website. However, in early April 2011, a live internet stream of the Benghazi station was established independently by a political activist, relaying off-air reception of the 675 AM signal. The location where the activist was receiving the 675 AM signal was not disclosed, though it must have been within Libya or its immediate vicinity as it had daytime reception of the signal by ground wave propagation.

A website called "Future for Libya", with a page called "Radio Free Libya", provided a link to the live stream and posts reports of Voice of Free Libya's broadcasts. However, there was no indication that this site is run by the station itself.

== Broadcasting hours ==
In late March and early April 2011, the broadcasting hours of the Benghazi station were reported to be 10 a.m. to midnight local time or 3.30 a.m. to 1.50 a.m local time However, it was also reported at the time that the station did not adhere to such a precise schedule and that it had sometimes been heard later than 2350 GMT/UTC.

In late April 2011, the Misrata station was reported to be on the air 24 hours a day.

== Foreign reports and reception ==
In the early stages of the Libyan uprising, the activities of the stations were reported by foreign journalists in the country, including video reports on the Benghazi and Bayda stations, which showed their staff, premises, transmitters and makeshift studios, and gave a vivid impression of improvised radio broadcasting in a civil conflict.

The Benghazi, Bayda and Misrata stations were all audible outside Libya. Numerous recordings made by radio enthusiasts in Europe were posted to media-sharing websites.

== Tobruk, Nalut, Jadu, Derna and Zliten stations ==
A "Radio Free Libya" was reported operating in the city of Tobruk (eastern Libya) in February 2011. The Tobruk station was not reported to have been heard outside Libya, suggesting that it may only have transmitted on FM, which generally has a shorter range than medium wave AM. The FM frequency may have been 98.0.

A report in late April 2011 described how "Radio Free Nalut" had begun broadcasting in that town "this week". The station was said to transmit on 98.2 FM. In late July, a report said that "Free Nalut", the local radio station, was broadcasting updates from the front and sending encouraging messages to towns in the region still controlled by Gaddafi.

A tweet by @ChangeInLibya on 14 June 2011 said a "Radio Free Jadu" was broadcasting on 89.1 FM from the town of the same name. Jadu and Nalut are in the Nafusa Mountains of western Libya.

A "Radio Free Derna" (in eastern Libya) was reported operating in June 2011. An Arabic-language video report posted to the internet on 15 June suggested that it operated on 89.3 FM.

The Facebook page of Voice of Free Libya in Misrata said on 22 June 2011 that "Radio Free Zliten" (between Misrata and Tripoli) was operating there on 91 FM.

== Other "Radio Free Benghazi" stations ==
A web-based facility was operating as early in the uprising as 18 February 2011. One source at the time referred to this as "Radio Free Benghazi", operating with "breathless amateur announcers", and said it was based in that city. However, there is no evidence that it was anything more than a chat facility enabling supporters of the uprising (perhaps outside the country) to speak to each other, or that it had any connection with the "Voice of Free Libya" radio in Benghazi that began broadcasting on 21 February.

In May 2011, an English-language station, Tribute FM, began broadcasting from Benghazi. A press report at the time dubbed the station "Radio free (sic) Benghazi" though there is no evidence that this name was used on the air. There was also no evidence that Tribute FM in Benghazi had any connection with the Voice of Free Libya station in the same city.
