= Al Aan FM =

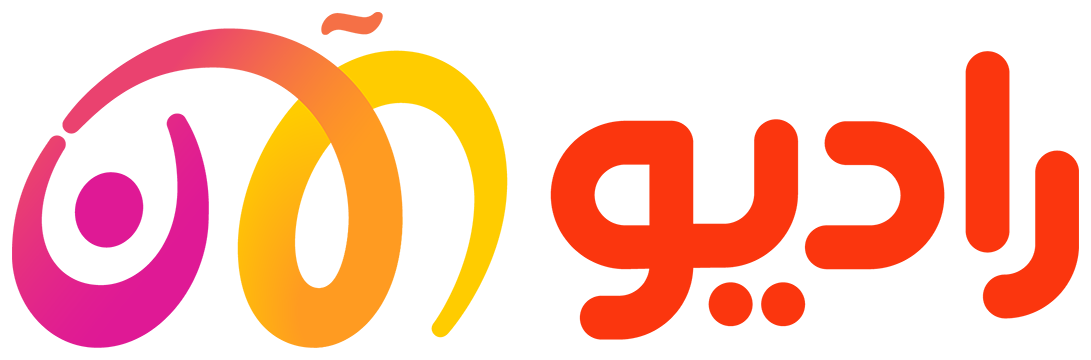
- Broadcast area: Syria, Iraq, Yemen, Libya
- Frequencies: Syria; 91.4 MHz (Tabqa, Ayn Issa, Raqqa); 96.6 MHz (Aleppo, Al-Bab, Manbij, Azaz, Afrin, Idlib, Latakia); 96.7 MHz (Kobani); 97.6 MHz (Hama, Homs, Qamishli, Al-Shaddadah, Amuda) Iraq; 92.7 MHz (Mosul, Kirkuk, Hawija, Duhok) Libya; 105.3 MHz

Programming
- Language: Arabic
- Format: Entertainment, News, Current Affairs

Ownership
- Owner: Al Aan TV

Links
- Webcast: https://www.alaan.fm
- Website: Al Aan FM

Al Aan FM (Arabic: راديو الآن) is an interactive radio and podcast platform broadcasting from Dubai, United Arab Emirates, to audiences across the Arab world. The station offers a mix of recorded podcast content and live programming, covering political, social, entertainment, and youth-oriented topics.

== History ==
Al Aan FM was launched by Al Aan TV in August 2012 in Libya, followed by its expansion to Syria in October 2012.

== Main Programs ==
- Marsad Al Jehadia (Arabic: مرصد الجهادية) – A program that monitors and analyzes Islamist movements, particularly Jihadism;
- Fi Eishrin Daqiqa (Arabic: في عشرين دقيقة) – A daily news program that provides in-depth discussion of current regional and international affairs. It examines events from the perspective of newsmakers and explores their broader social impact. The program is presented by Bara'a Salibi;
- Sarat Maei (Arabic: صارت معي) – A storytelling program featuring personal experiences, life lessons, and social issues shared by participants. The program is prepared and presented by Maha Fatoom;
- Wait for our call (Arabic: انتظر اتصالنا) – A podcast focused on listener engagement across the Arab world, highlighting followers' stories and personal experiences.

== Frequencies ==
=== Libya ===
In Libya, Al Aan FM uses 105.3 MHz across the country, covering the following cities:

- Al Bayda
- Al Marj
- Al Majabrah
- Ghat
- Gadamis
- Jadu
- Kabaw
- Misrata
- Labraq
- Nalut
- Sabratah
- Susah
- Tripoli
- Waddan
- Wazin
- Zawara & Al Jmail

=== Syria ===
In Syria, Al Aan FM is available in the following cities and frequencies:

- 91.4 MHz
  - Tabqa, Ayn Issa, Raqqa
- 91.9 MHz
  - Damascus
- 96.6 MHz
  - Aleppo, Al-Bab, Manbij, Azaz, Afrin, Idlib, Latakia
- 96.7 MHz
  - Kobani
- 97.6 MHz
  - Hama, Homs, Qamishli, Al-Shaddadah, Amuda, Mayadin

=== Satellite ===
- Badr 4: Frequency 12111 H SR 27500, FEC 3/4
- Nilesat 201: Frequency 11938 V SR 27500, FEC 3/4

== Logos ==
Old logo before 1 October 2021
