= Mathaba News Agency =

Libyan independent alternative news agency

- Type: News agency
- Founded: 1999; 27 years ago
- Defunct: c. 2016; 10 years ago
- Fate: Defunct
- Headquarters: Libya
- Products: News stories
- Owner: International Green Charter Movement

The Mathaba News Agency (MNA) was an independent alternative news agency founded in 1999. According to the site, MATHABA stood for Media Active To Help All Become Aware. The agency's tagline was, "News That Matters." (Note: MNA is not to be confused with the World Mathaba Organization (Arabic: المثابة العالمية al-Mathāba al-'ālamiyya.) (al-Mathaba Aalamiya, meaning "The World Center"), founded by the Libyan state in 1982 to further world-revolutionary and anti-imperialist goals. The World Mathaba Organization organized a number of conferences in Tripoli, attended by leftist and anti-Western leaders including Robert Mugabe of Zimbabwe's ZANU-PF, Daniel Ortega of the FSLN in Nicaragua, Raul Reyes of Colombia's FARC, and Luiz Inácio Lula da Silva of Brazil.)

The Mathaba News Agency provided hosting and news services for the International Green Charter Movement (IGCM), based on Gaddafi's Green Book and given coverage to the political philosophy it espouses, known as the Third Universal Theory. The MNA also hosted a forum and a private microblogging service. The MNA referred to itself as "the first stateless news organization in history," with the goal of offering readers "a better understanding of public issues and positive development".

It has had limited comments and no new material for most of the period since the fall of the Qaddafi government in 2011.

== Content ==
At the time of a 2002 report in The New York Times, Mathaba represented the closest thing to an online outlet for foreigners to engage the Libyan government, even inviting visitors to send an SMS message purportedly to Gaddafi himself.

During the 2011 war on Libya, the Mathaba News Agency provided extensive coverage of the news of the Libyan Jamahiriya.

Mathaba's content was a mixture of original and republished articles along with various blog posts and videos, as well as excerpts from speeches. The site's official disclaimer stated that the site's content "should be treated simply as a catalog of information of real significance" and that not all articles are necessarily endorsed by Mathaba itself.

=== Accusations of antisemitism ===
The commentary of controversial figures such as David Duke and Louis Farrakhan were among those selected for publication on the site.

It accused Hillary Clinton of leading "banker jewish zionist-elite gangsters" and called Google "a company owned by Zionist Jews". The agency denied any accusations of anti-Semitism, saying, "we have regular Jewish contributors and analysts, we are not against ANY religion," but that it would report on statistical anomalies it deemed newsworthy such as "the fact that all five directors of the U.S. money supply (Federal Reserve Bank) are Jewish," and inviting readers to "draw their own conclusions".

=== Conspiracy theories ===
Conspiracy theories were a common fixture of Mathaba's content, including claims that Osama bin Laden had been dead for years before he was reported killed; that the AIDS virus was created by the World Health Organization to reduce the populations of nonwhite African countries; and that Zionists control the media and were behind the Assassination of John F. Kennedy, the September 11 attacks, and the wars in Iraq and Libya.

== Libyan civil war ==
During the 2011 Libyan Civil War, Mathaba featured articles and republished blog posts from a pro-Gaddafi perspective, including reporting on Hugo Chavez's support for the Gaddafi government, while it also reported on Western opposition to the NATO 2011 military intervention in Libya, citing articles by Dennis Kucinich, among others. Frontline reports were regularly published summarizing each day's events, with claims of many battlefield victories by Gaddafi loyalists. On 16 August 2011, three months after rebels had defeated Gaddafi forces in Misrata, the news agency reported that "Misrata has been liberated by loyalist volunteers of Colonel Muammar Gaddafi and the Libyan Defence Forces." It further reported, on 25 August 2011, that news reports showing Tripoli in the hands of the rebels were "fake footage from Qatar" made using a "replica of Tripoli in Qatar ... used to spread fake media reports on Jazeera, CNN and the BBC worldwide." As late as 1 September 2011, with the opposition in control of most of the country, the agency claimed that Gaddafi still had "massive support among an estimated 95% of the population."

On 13 October 2011, Mathaba reported that 80% of both Tripoli and Benghazi were controlled by Gaddafi loyalists, as well as 90-100% of the southern portion of the country. When NATO declared after the announcement of death of Muammar Gaddafi on 20 October that it would soon cease its military operations in the country, Mathaba stated that NATO had "surrendered". The agency also insisted that the video and images of Gaddafi's capture and body were faked and that he was "not captured and not killed" but "very much alive in more ways than one", and though he "does not need to speak... in the future if the time is right... he may choose to address us again". Readers were instructed to continue to spread the Green Charter in the meantime.

== See also ==
- Jamahiriya News Agency
