= Moussa Ibrahim =

Libyan political figure (born 1974)

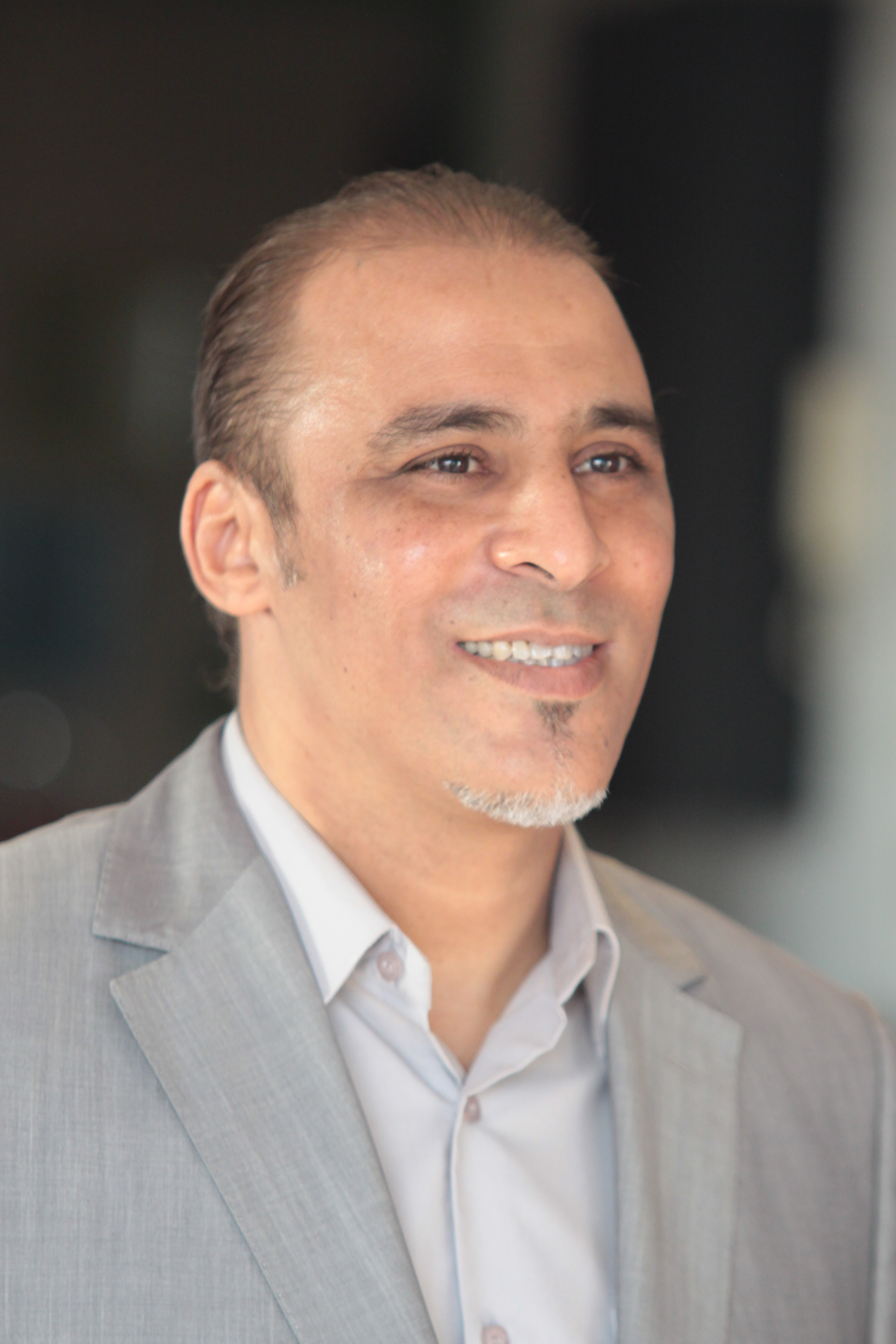
- Moussa Ibrahim in September 2015
- Born: 7 December 1974 (age 51); Sirte, Libyan Arab Republic
- Education: University of Exeter; School of Oriental and African Studies, University of London; Royal Holloway, University of London
- Occupation: Government spokesman
- Organization: Libyan Arab Jamahiriya
- Known for: Libyan Civil War

Moussa Ibrahim Gaddafi (Arabic: موسى إبراهيم; romanized also as Mussa and Musa, born 7 December 1974) is a Libyan political figure who rose to international attention in 2011 as Muammar Gaddafi's Information Minister and official spokesman, serving in this role until the government was toppled the same year in the Libyan Civil War. Ibrahim held frequent press conferences in the course of the war, denouncing rebel forces and the NATO-led military intervention, often in defiant and impassioned tones. His status and whereabouts remained unknown following the Battle of Tripoli in which the Gaddafi government was overthrown, although there were several claims and subsequent refutations of his capture. Eventually, in late 2014, it was discovered he was in Egypt before he was deported and fled to Serbia. On 12 January 2015 Moussa Ibrahim spoke publicly by video link at a political event hosted at the Committee Rooms Houses of Parliament, Westminster, London from an undisclosed location, also the Director of Private Security Company.

== Biography ==
Ibrahim was born on 7 December 1974 into Gaddafi's Qadhadhfa tribe. He studied politics at the University of Exeter in the early 2000s, where he met his future wife Julia Ramelow, a German-born theology student, with whom he has a young son. He worked on a PhD in media arts at Royal Holloway, University of London, completing his final exam in May 2010. One of Ibrahim's lecturers at the University of Exeter, Dr. Larbi Sadiki, described him as an engaging, friendly but serious student — "a nice guy but with a short fuse." He told Sky News: "I lived in London for 15 years. I know every street in London. I know how decent the British people are."

On 19 August 2011, his brother was allegedly killed by a NATO Apache helicopter in Zawiya. During the Battle of Tripoli, he called for a ceasefire and blamed NATO and the West for the situation, saying that the conflicting parties should sit down and negotiate; although he also said that thousands of professional soldiers were ready to defend Tripoli against rebel forces staging an uprising within the capital, as well those advancing towards the city from Zawiya.

After the fall of Tripoli, Ibrahim allegedly went on the run with Saif al-Islam Gaddafi and was sighted by a senior NTC field commander in Bani Walid. He was involved in negotiations with the NTC in Bani Walid and insisted that the rebels disarm before entering the town, which ultimately led to the breakdown in negotiations on 4 September 2011. Ibrahim also used local radio in Bani Walid to prevent people from surrendering to the NTC by claiming they were NATO and al-Qaeda.

On 5 September 2011, Ibrahim called Reuters by telephone to confirm that Muammar Gaddafi was still in Libya, but declined to say where Gaddafi or himself was.

On 16 September 2011, Ibrahim phoned Syria-based pro-Gaddafi Arrai TV and claimed that Gaddafi supporters had the ability to continue their resistance for months and that Gaddafi supporters had infiltrated into the NTC's ranks and were working to sabotage them from within.

On 26 September 2011, Ibrahim called Reuters by satellite phone to confirm that he was in Sirte the day before when it came under attack by NTC and acknowledged that the situation in Sirte was "quite bad." He confirmed that Gaddafi was still in Libya, but refused to comment on the specific location. He also claimed that he had left Sirte, but vowed to "go back there." It was incorrectly reported by Misrata-based Freedom TV on 29 September 2011 that Ibrahim had been captured near Sirte by NTC fighters while "dressed as a woman." No independent confirmation was forthcoming, and the report was denied by a pro-Gaddafi TV channel. Later that day a spokesman for the Misrata Military Council, Adel Ibrahim, told AFP "We cannot confirm he was arrested", and two days later an NTC commander admitted they had not captured him.

On 20 October 2011, on the day Gaddafi was killed in the Battle of Sirte, Reuters reported that Ibrahim had been captured near Sirte, according to a Libyan transitional forces commander; however, this was again proven to be untrue. On 22 October 2011, he was reportedly captured for a third time, along with Saif al-Islam Gaddafi, near Bani Walid. This claim was also discredited, as Saif was not captured until 19 November near the town of Ubari. On 20 January 2012, it was reported for the fourth time that Ibrahim had been captured in Asbi'a, Libya. However, the following day these claims were denied by officials in Tripoli. On 22 January 2012, a video was released showing Ibrahim boarding an airplane and claimed he was in "excellent health."

On 20 October 2012, Ibrahim was reported captured for the fifth time, in the town of Tarhuna, 40 miles south of Tripoli. For the first time, the reports were backed by the government, who said he was "being transferred to Tripoli to begin interrogation." An audio clip was then released on Facebook, purporting to be Ibrahim's voice denying the reports. On 24 October, government spokesman Nasser Al Manaa apologised for the false reports along with claims that Khamis Gaddafi had been killed. In fact, Khamis Gaddafi had been killed by a NATO airstrike on 29 August 2011 near Tarhuna and his death was confirmed by Arrai TV on 18 October 2011.

Ibrahim's elder brother Mohamed Ibrahim Mansour, a "senior finance official" under Gaddafi, was reportedly arrested in Cairo on 19 March 2013, facing charges of corruption. Several new audio clips purportedly of Ibrahim have been published online, but remain unverified.

On 31 October 2014, Egypt's state-run newspaper Al-Ahram reported that Egypt, which had become increasingly close to the internationally recognized government of Libya based in Tobruk, agreed to deport Moussa Ibrahim from Cairo. Ibrahim, reached over Facebook however, denied the report claiming that he left the country due to work commitments in Serbia.

On 12 January 2015, Moussa Ibrahim spoke publicly by video link at an event called "Libya: NATO's untold story" hosted by the Tricontinental Anti-Imperialist Platform at the Committee Rooms Houses of Parliament, in Westminster, London.

On 30 July 2015, Moussa Ibrahim led a Gaddafi loyalist demonstration in front of the United Nations office in Cairo to protest the death sentence of Saif al-Islam Gaddafi.

On 27 April 2019, Moussa Ibrahim revealed that Gaddafi loyalists, including military, security, and civil society leaderships, had declared support for Khalifa Haftar, and praised Haftar's Operation Dignity for the release and general amnesty of Gaddafi regime detainees.

On 18 January 2020, Moussa Ibrahim claimed on RT that Green Resistance (Gaddafi loyalists) was using Haftar's army as a "vehicle for sovereign Libya." On 13 December 2021, he appeared on RT again to talk about the 2021–22 Libyan presidential election.

== See also ==
- Moussa Koussa, Libyan minister for foreign affairs, March 2009 to March 2011
- Hala Misrati
- Baghdad Bob
- Mohammad Marandi
- Green Resistance
