= Al-Shibani Church =

Building in Aleppo, Syria

Coordinates: 36°11′50″N 37°09′22″E

Al-Shibani Building كنيسة الشيباني Kanīsa aš-Šībānī
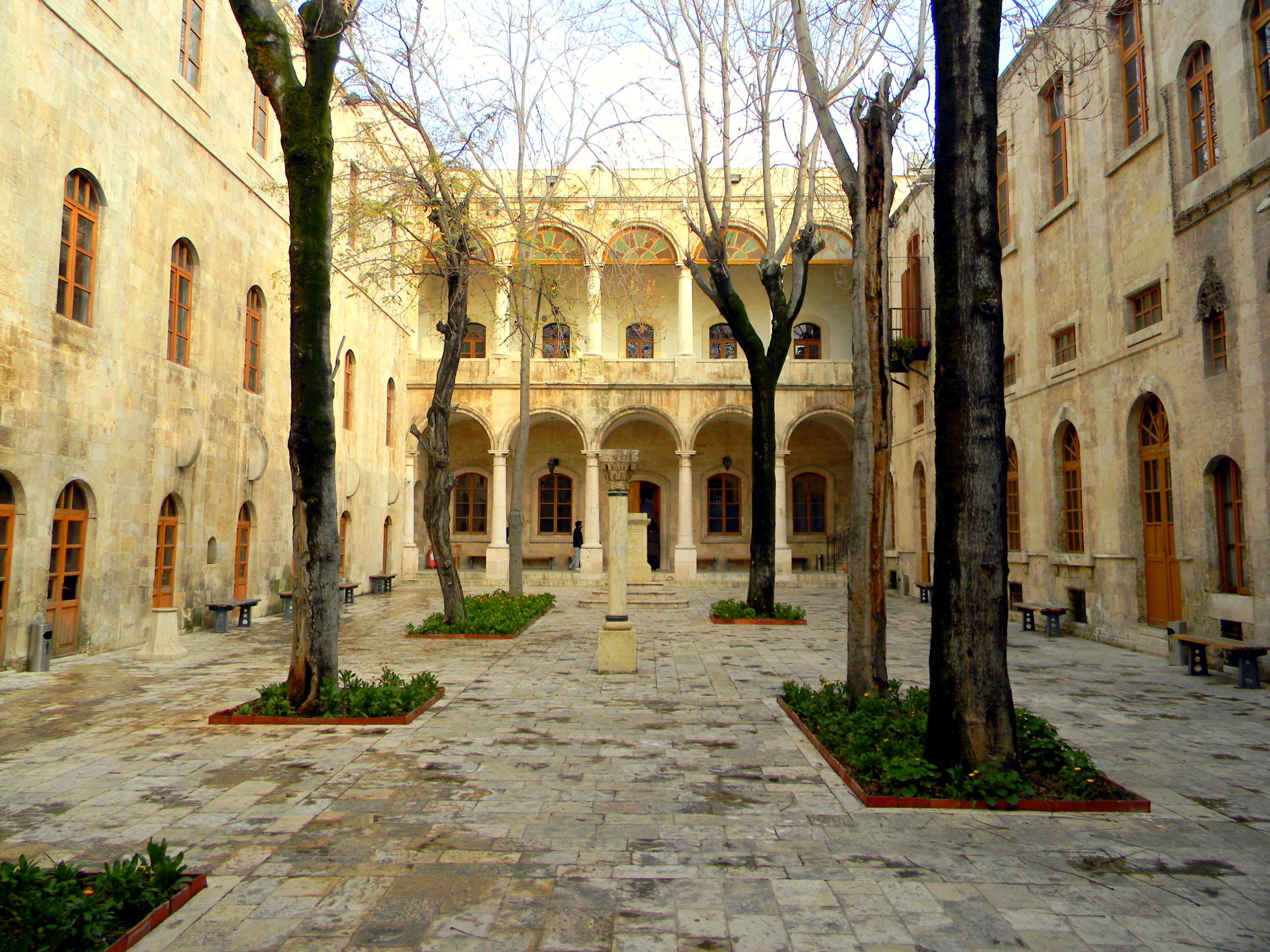
- Al-Shibani Building

Religion
- District: Al-Jalloum
- Year consecrated: 12th century

Location
- Location: Aleppo, Syria
- Interactive map of Al-Shibani Building كنيسة الشيباني; Kanīsa aš-Šībānī

Architecture
- Type: Church

Al-Shibani Church (Arabic: كنيسة الشيباني, romanized: Kanīsa aš-Šībānī), also known as al-Shibani School (Arabic: مدرسة الشيباني, romanized: Madrasa aš-Šībānī), is a 12th-century religious and cultural centre located in al-Jalloum district of the Ancient City of Aleppo, Syria. The complex is located to the west of the al-Saffahiyah Mosque and of the south of Souq Khan al-Nahhaseen.

== History ==
The area currently occupied by the building was used as the site of one of the four main churches of ancient Aleppo during the pre-Islamic period. After the Islamic rule, part of that church was designated to become used as an Islamic school or madrasah and called the "Glassmakers School" (Arabic: المدرسة الزجاجية).

However, the current building of al-Shibani was built during the 12th century. By the end of the 16th century, the building became part of the properties of the Ottoman Wāli of Aleppo Ahmet Pasha Matyab Zadeh. After many decades, the site had been purchased by al-Shibani family, during the 17th century. The building along with the surrounding areas became known as Khan al-Shibani.

During the 19th century, the Khan was possessed by the Franciscan Missionaries of Mary, where they founded the first college in Aleppo, the "Collège de Terre-Sainte" (The Holy Land College Arabic: معهد الأرض المقدّسة) along with a nearby church. The rehabilitation works of the building began in 1853 and the college was opened in 1859. However, the construction of the whole complex was completed in 1879. The college has played a significant role in the educational and cultural life of Aleppo and Syria, with the graduation of many prominent politicians and writers within the end of the 19th century and the beginning of the 20th century.

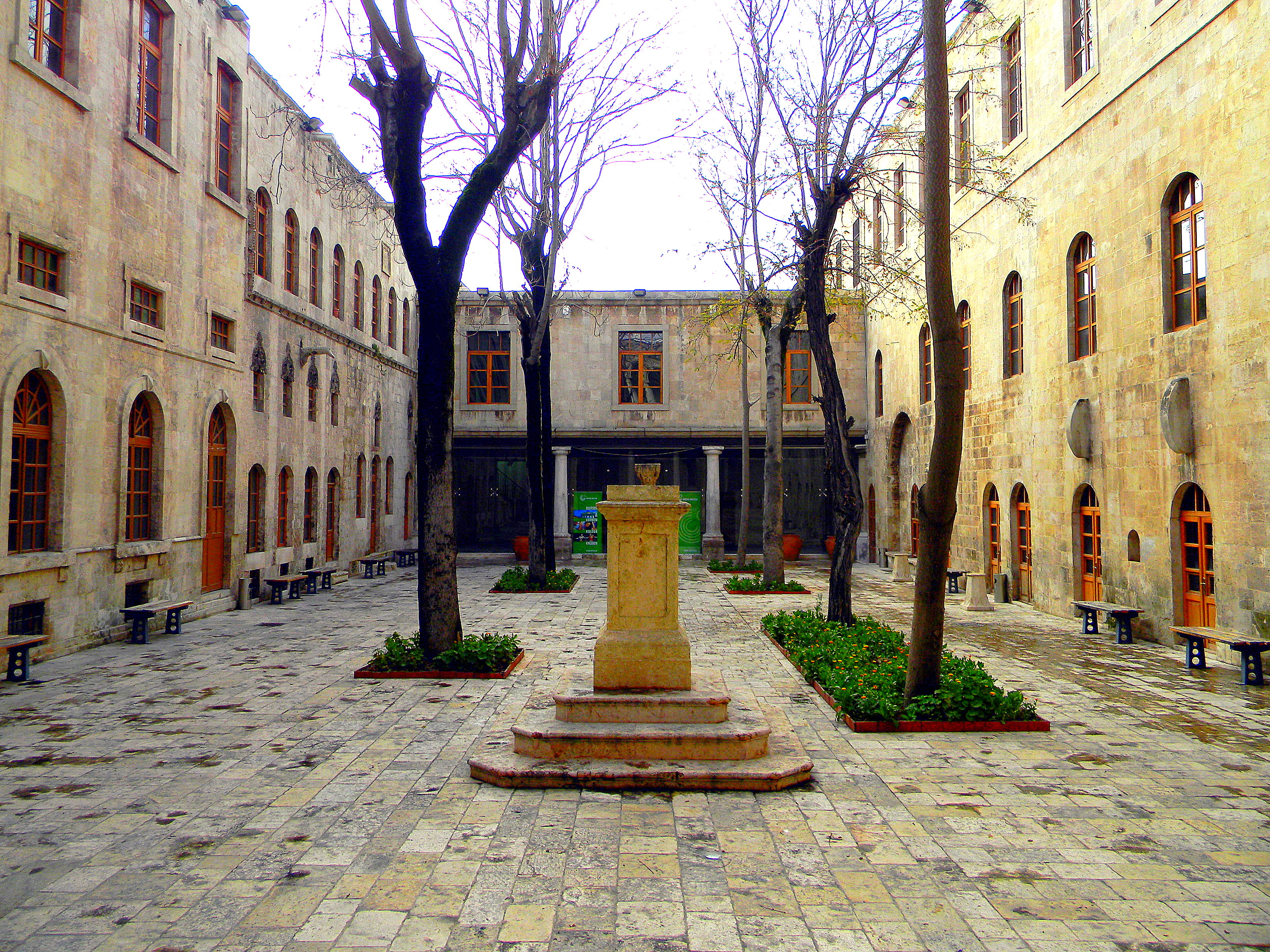
Al-Shibani Church-School

Finally, the Latin Catholic church of al-Shibani complex was demolished in 1934 to be moved to the new Christian quarter of al-Aziziyah. The stones were used to build the new cathedral of the Latins in al-Aziziyeh quarter (completed in 1937) which was renamed after Saint Francis of Assisi.

In 1937, the Terre-Sainte College of al-Shibani complex was moved to a new neighborhood located at the south-western suburbs of Aleppo (currently known as al-Furqan district) and functioned until 1967 when it was turned into the "Partisans Enrollment Institute" of the Arab Socialist Ba'ath Party.

Later on, the building of al-Shibani became a state property of the Syrian Government and turned into a tobacco warehouse with no maintenance works implemented for more than 50 years. It functioned as a warehouse until 2001 when a new plan was scheduled for the revival of the building, in the frameworks of the Syrian-German cooperation, funded by the Federal Ministry of Economic Cooperation and Development of Germany. In December 2006, the rehabilitation works of the building were completed by the efforts of "Aleppo City Council" with the assistance of the "German Technical Cooperation" GTZ. After this major renovation, the building has become a unique venue to host cultural events and exhibitions, in addition to the permanent exhibition of the rehabilitation process in the ground hall of the building.

== Description ==
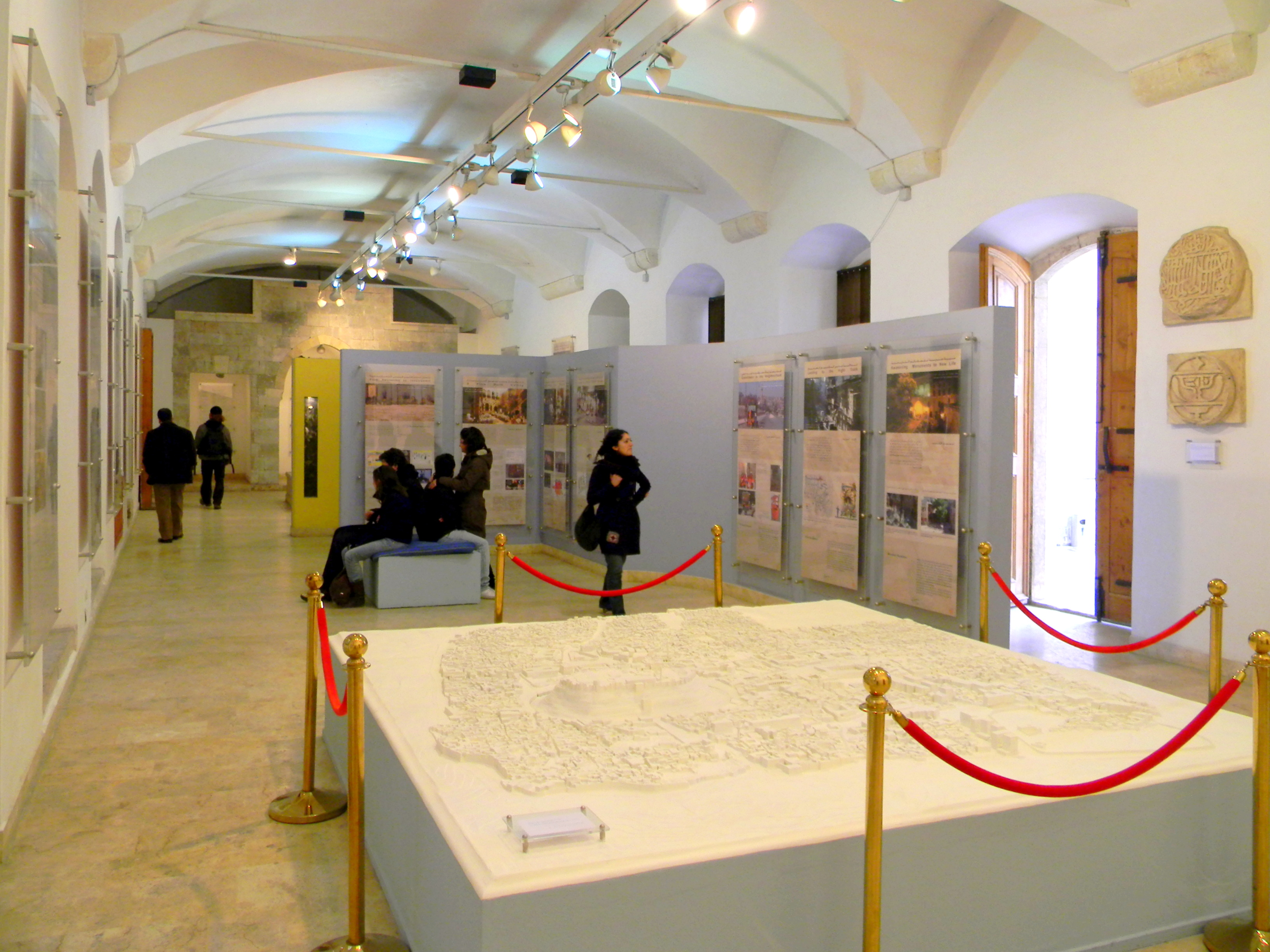
Permanent exhibition of Aleppo history

The building consists of two floors with a large courtyard in the centre. The building has many exhibition halls, being used for several purposes, such as the "Old Aleppo Reviaval Hall" which is proposed to commemorate the ancient city of Aleppo through a number of pictures and figures of old Aleppine districts, suqs, mosques and khans, as well as a pattern of the Citadel of Aleppo and the surrounding old quarters.

One of the halls in the ground floor depicts the rehabilitation process of the building.

The building is also home to the main offices of Goethe-Institut and Aga Khan Cultural Services in Aleppo, in addition to the Heritage Archive Centre of the Aleppo Archeological Society (Arabic: مركز أرشفة التراث العائد لجمعية العاديات بحلب).

Al-Shibani school-church is one of the prominent samples of old Aleppine architecture.

== Gallery ==
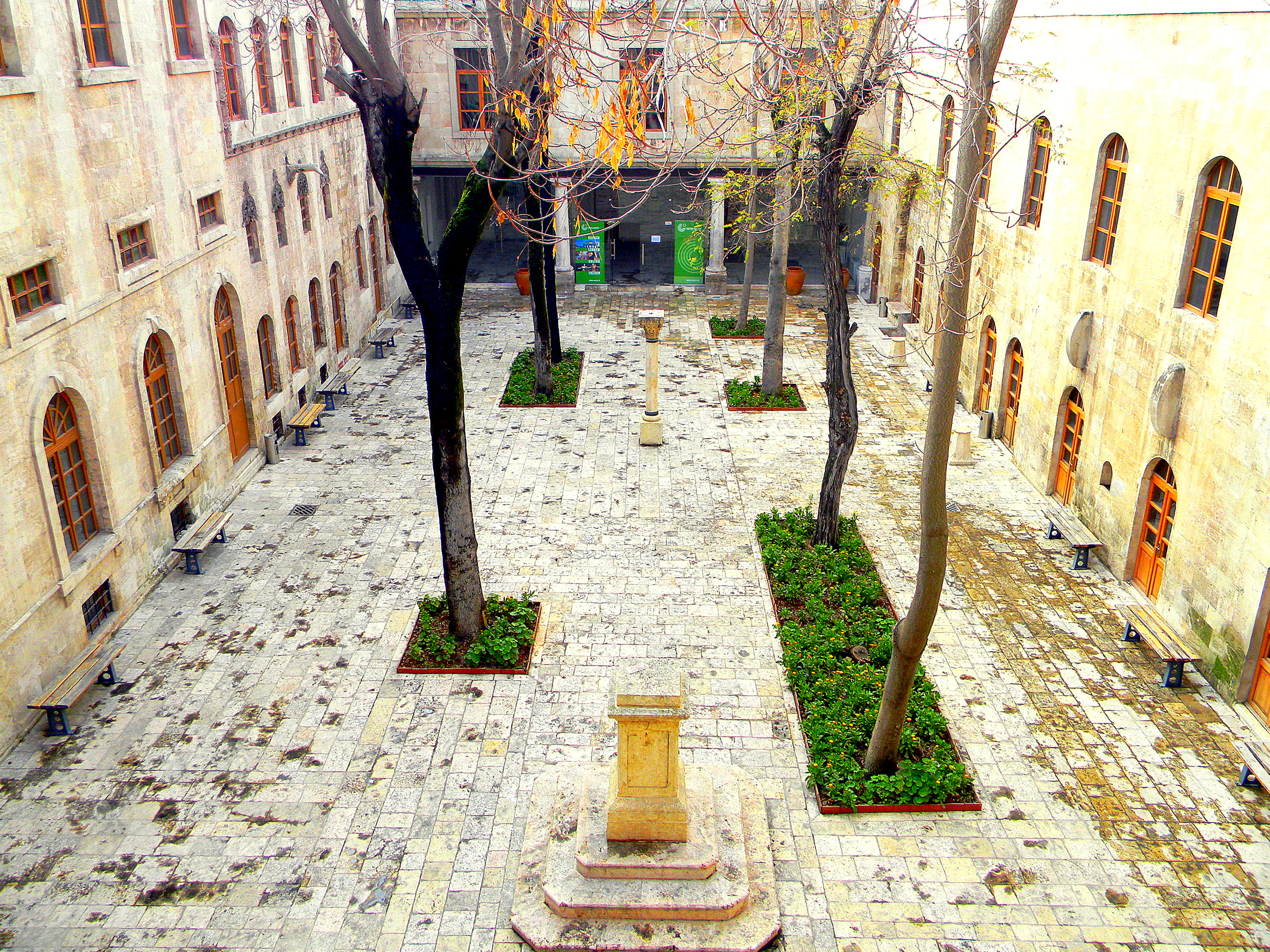
General view

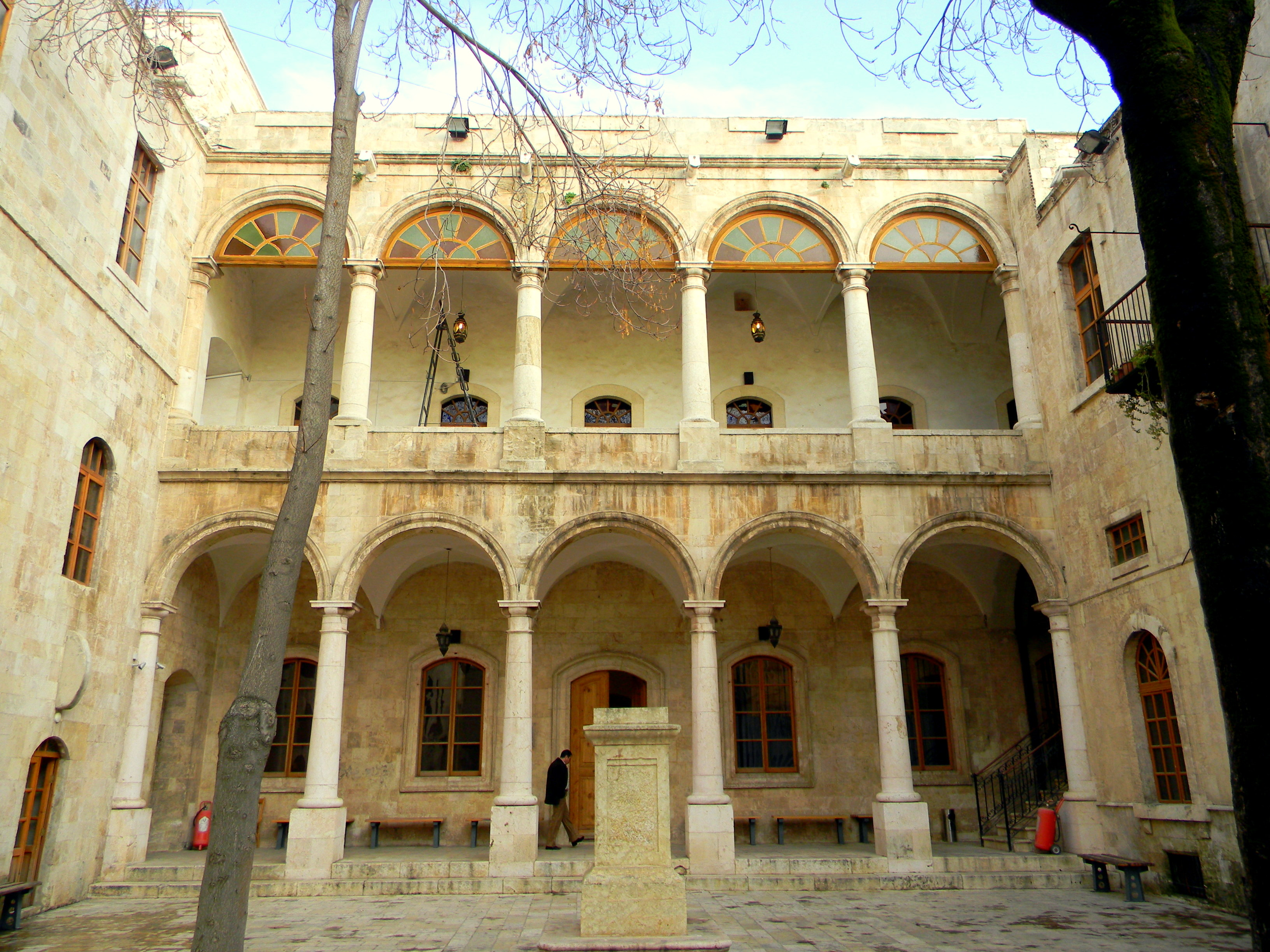
The main facade

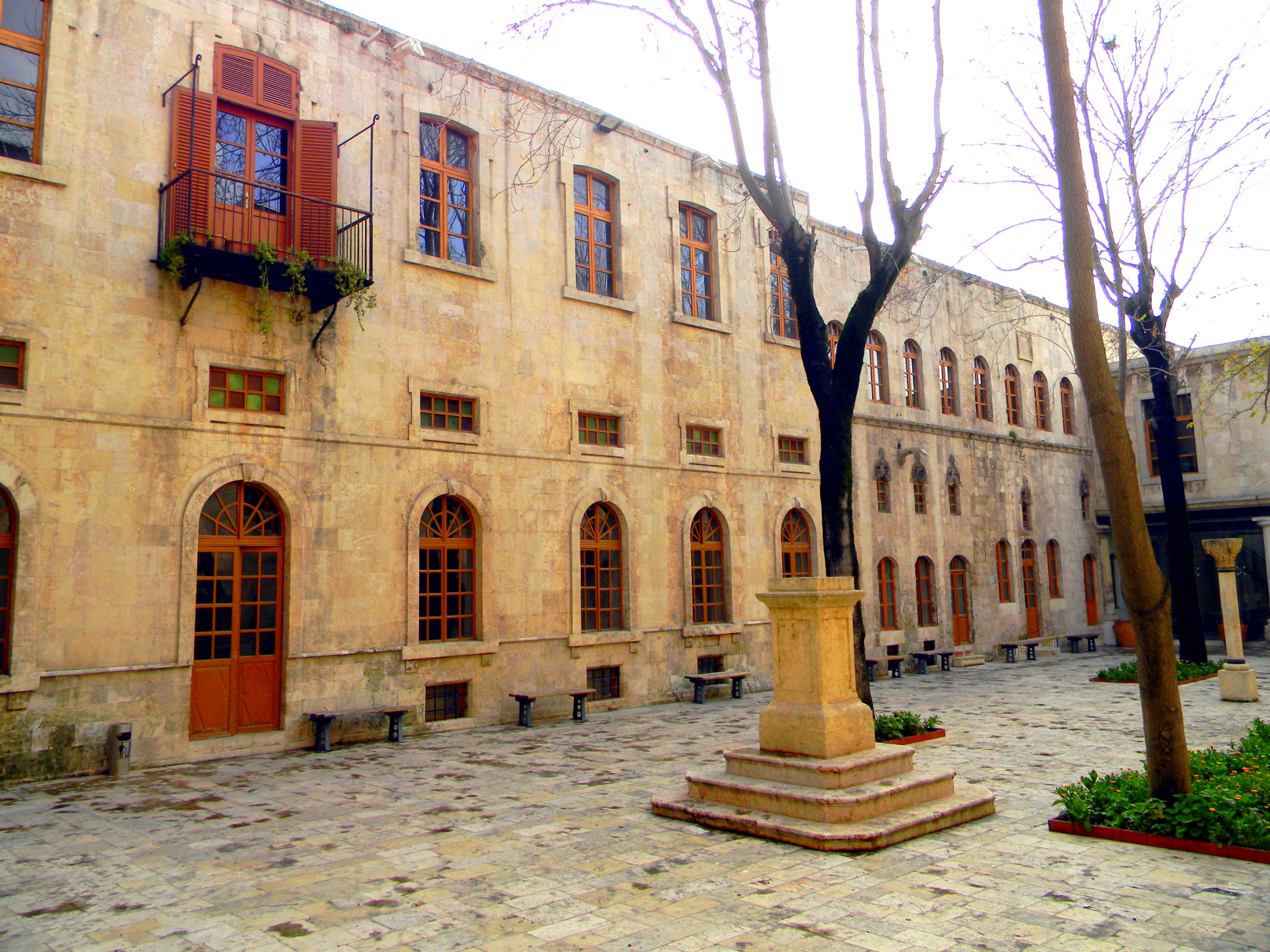
The courtyard

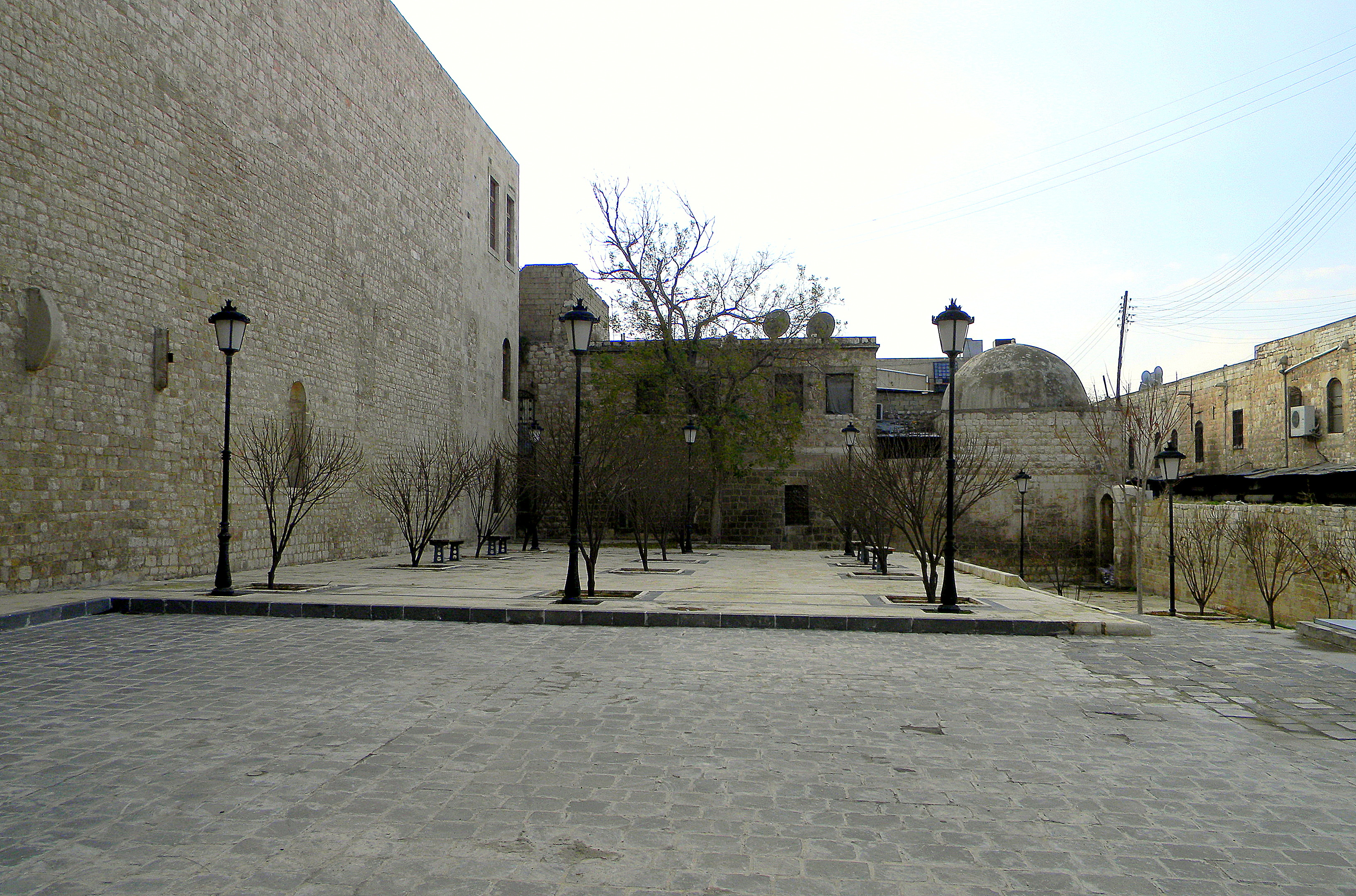
The external courtyard
