= Libyan Jamahiriya Broadcasting Corporation =

State-run broadcasting organization in Libya under the rule of Muammar Gaddafi

- Country: Great Socialist People's Libyan Arab Jamahiriya
- Owner: Government of Libya
- Dissolved: 21 August 2011
- Former names: People's Revolutionary Broadcasting Corporation (until 24 December 2001)
- Al-Jamahiriya TV: Television
- LJBC Radio: Radio
- Al-Madina TV: Television
- Official website: https://www.ljbctv.tv/ (Defunct)

Libyan Jamahiriya Broadcasting Corporation (LJBC) (Arabic: الهيئة العامة لإذاعات الجماهيرية العظمى) was the Libyan state-run broadcasting organization under the rule of Muammar Gaddafi. It distributed news in coordination with the Jamahiriya News Agency in accordance with state laws controlling Libya media.

On 22 August 2011, the organization was rendered defunct when its channels were taken off-air by anti-Gaddafi fighters, which had entered Tripoli the previous day.

== Organization ==
The corporation's website and online presence was serviced by fifty employees, mostly journalists. They were organized into four departments; news editing, programming, design, and maintenance and operations, based in offices in Tripoli.

== Stations ==
=== Television ===
Stations run by the LJBC include:

- Al-Jamahiriya TV – the official state television channel with news and entertainment
- Al-Madina TV – an entertainment channel
- Al-Jamahiriya Satellite Channel – international satellite channel
- Al Mounawaa
- Al Hidaya Al Libiya
- Al Shababiyah – youth programming
- Al Libiya (formerly Al Jamahiriya 2) – a general entertainment channel
- Al Badeel
- Al Jamahiriya TV English – English speaking channel
- Libya Al Riadhiya – Sports channel

=== Radio ===
- Radio Jamahirya 103.4 MHz – generalist program in Arabic
- Voice of the Libyan People – international shortwave radio broadcasts

== Al-Jamahiriya TV ==
Al-Jamahiriya TV
- Country: Libya
- Broadcast area: International
- Network: Libyan Jamahiriya Broadcasting Corporation

Programming
- Languages: Arabic, English, French, Chinese
- Picture format: PAL

History
- Launched: 24 December 1968 (original date); 2012 (relaunch)
- Former names: Libyan Television Service (1968–1971); Libyan Arab Republic Television (1972–1977); People's Revolutionary Broadcasting Corp. Television (1977–2001)

Links
- Website: https://jamahiriya.tv/

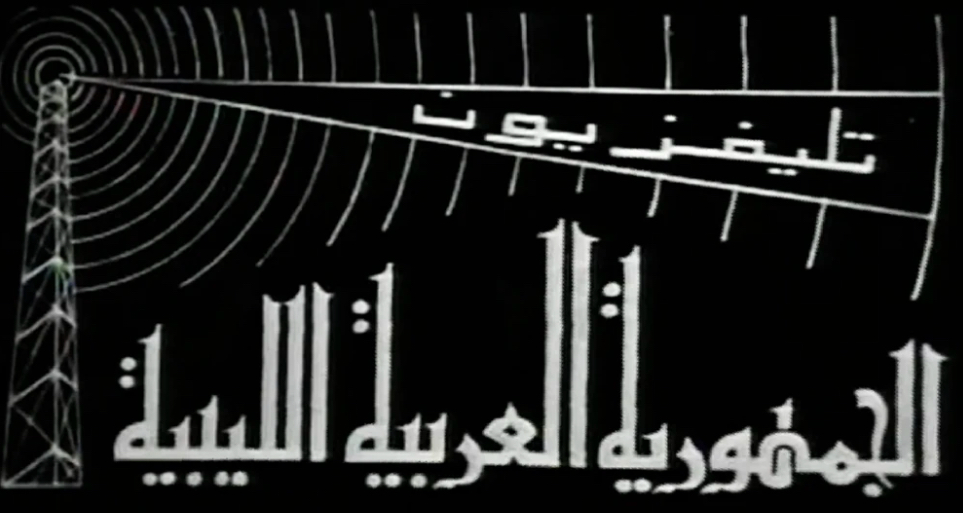
First logo from 1969

Al-Jamahiriya TV was a Libyan television channel broadcast by the Libyan Jamahiriya Broadcasting Corporation. The channel broadcast mainly Libyan Al-Jamahiriya discussions, cultural programs and news bulletins. It was available in three languages: Arabic, English and French.

Emphasis was left to the official Libyan political and government activities, with live coverage of sessions of the People's Congress, speeches of the "Guide of the Revolution" (the official position held by Colonel Gaddafi) and readings of The Green Book, written by the Libyan leader, and published in 1975.

The channel started in the morning and ended in the evening by reading verses of the Quran followed by the national anthem, before giving way to a focus and national radio.

Construction work for the stations in Tripoli and Benghazi started in 1967 and was completed by year-end 1968. On 24 December 1968, regular television broadcasts began with coverage of the Independence Day parade. In this early period, TV broadcasts began at 8pm and ended at 10:45pm.

The Libyan national television was broadcast via satellite to the Arab world and Europe via the satellites Arabsat and Hot Bird from 1997.

On 22 August 2011, the station was taken off-air by the National Transitional Council forces, which had entered Tripoli the previous day.

The channel was relaunched in 2012 by the Libyan diaspora from a studio in Cairo, Egypt, but broadcasts were sporadic. Regular broadcasts resumed after Russian oligarch Yevgeny Prigozhin purchased new technical equipments for the TV studio and paid off debts to satellite providers and staff.

== See also ==
- Media in Libya
- Hala Misrati
