= Tribute FM =

Radio station in Libya

- Formation: May 2011
- Purpose: Anti-Gaddafi Broadcast Media
- Official language: English
- Website: http://tributefm.com/

Tribute FM is an English-language radio station targeting a Libyan audience both inside and outside the country. It was launched in May 2011 during the country's civil war. It is opposed to the government of Muammar al-Gaddafi.

Tribute FM describes itself as "Libya's first free, independent and urban English radio station". It says it is run by young Libyans who decided that the once banned English language should now have a presence on the airwaves of "the New Free Libya".

== Transmission arrangements ==
Tribute FM is available via a live internet stream; through iTunes, Winamp, VLC media player and Windows Media Player; and using iPhone and Android Phone.

A tweet from @TributeFM on 6 June 2011 said the station was "now live 24/7" on 92.4 FM in and around the rebel capital of Benghazi.

== Launch history ==
Tribute FM started test transmissions on 8 May 2011. On the morning of 11 May, it was still in test mode, announcing: "You’re listening to Tribute FM, broadcasting from Benghazi. We will be back live at 6 p.m. GMT (UTC) till approximately 1 a.m. GMT. For more information about how you can listen to us, please go to http://www.tributefm.com."

Tribute FM was launched by four people, at least two of whom have dual Libyan and British nationality. Because of fears of reprisals by Gaddafi loyalists, they do not disclose their full names. Similarly, the exact location of the station's studio is a secret, though it is said to be in Benghazi.

In late May 2011, Tribute FM was broadcasting daily from 8 p.m. to about 4 a.m. local time (18:00-02:00 UTC).

Also in late May 2011, it was reported that the station's studio had suffered minor damage in a bomb attack. This followed an accusation by pro-Gaddafi television that Tribute FM was a foreign-financed attempt to spread Christianity.

== Other opposition radio stations ==
A number of other opposition radio stations, calling themselves Voice of Free Libya or Radio Free Libya, including one station in Benghazi, began broadcasting in Arabic earlier in the civil war. It is unclear whether Tribute FM has any connection with them.
