= Personal life of Muammar Gaddafi =

The personal life of Muammar Gaddafi was complicated and the subject of significant international interest. He considered himself a pious Muslim, though his view on Islam was largely personal. He was known for his traditional clothing as opposed to Western attire. He had many sons and nephews who held senior positions in the military and government.

== Personality ==
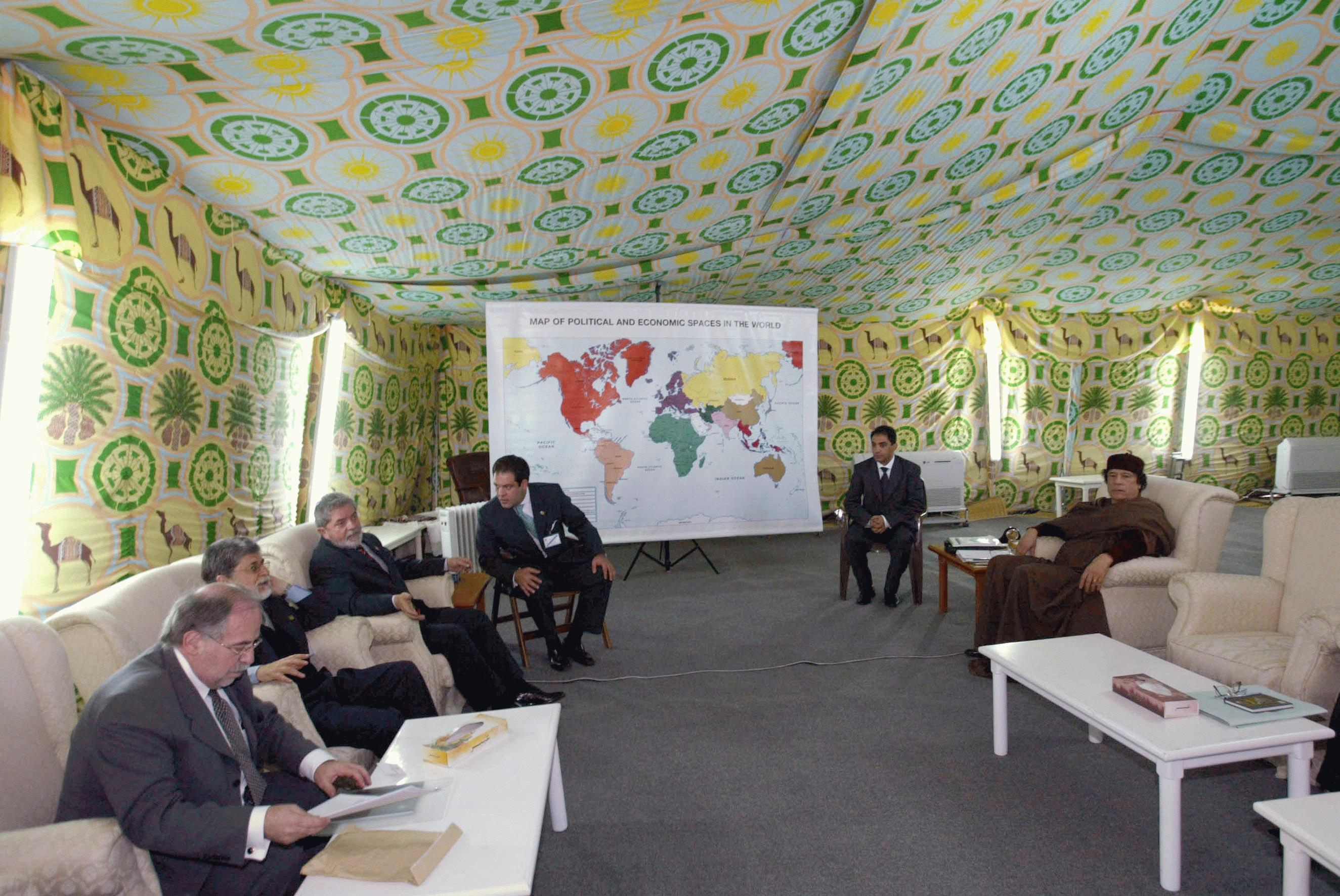
Strongly influenced by his Bedouin background, Gaddafi often organized political meetings in a large tent (meeting with Lula da Silva in 2003 pictured).

A very private individual, Gaddafi was given to rumination and solitude and could be reclusive. Reporter Mirella Bianco interviewed Gaddafi's father, who stated that his son was "always serious, even taciturn", also being courageous, intelligent, pious, and family-oriented. Gaddafi's friends described him to Bianco as a loyal and generous man. According to his biographer Alice Pargeter, Gaddafi "was always a Bedouin of the desert [...] who shunned ostentatious wealth" and a westernized lifestyle. Gaddafi's upbringing in Bedouin culture influenced his personal tastes for the rest of his life; he preferred the desert over the city and would retreat there to meditate. Even abroad, he insisted on travelling with a massive bedouin tent and to be supplied with fresh camel milk. Historian John Oakes argued that Gaddafi's Bedouin background strongly informed his worldview and personality, such as his tendencies to oversimplify, take extreme positions, and prefer informal as well as kinship power over obvious wealth and regular state structures.

More widely, he was often regarded as being "bizarre, irrational or quixotic". Bearman noted that Gaddafi was emotionally volatile and had an impulsive temperament, with the CIA believing that the Libyan leader suffered from clinical depression. In 2008, two hundred African traditional leaders crowned Gaddafi "King of Kings" in what international media described as a "bizarre ceremony". Pargeter considered this coronation as a sign how Gaddafi craved to be accepted and adored. Researcher Muriel Mirak-Weissbach argued that Gaddafi was afflicted by a narcissistic personality disorder. She referenced Gaddafi's tendency to extreme self-aggrandizement such as repeated claims of being universally loved by all Libyans, ascribing himself superhuman or "god-like" qualities, and adopting various "grandiose" titles. In addition, Mirak-Weissbach stated that Gaddafi was extremely paranoid, regarding any opposition as a wider Western-Zionist conspiracy.

== Physical health ==
He was seen in a wheelchair in 1998, allegedly due to hip surgery, which caused speculations about his health.

== Religion ==
Gaddafi described himself as a "simple revolutionary" and "pious Muslim" called upon by God to continue Nasser's work. Gaddafi was an austere and devout Muslim, although according to Vandewalle, his interpretation of Islam was "deeply personal and idiosyncratic." According to his cousin Ahmed Gaddaf al-Dam, Muammar was very devout and described him as theologically and politically close to Salafism. Gaddafi often interrupted meetings with other heads of state to pray at the appropriate times. Religion also played a major role in his political theories.

Gaddafi viewed the Shi'as favorably and defended unity between them and the Sunnis as a single ummah. He praised Hezbollah's actions against the IDF and its role as an anti-imperialist force in the Middle East and in 2007 he went so far as to claim that the division between Sunnis and Shi'as is a great farce and that all Muslims are, in some way, Sunni and Shi'a at the same time, saying "There is no Muslim who does not apply the Sunnah of the Prophet, and whoever does not apply it is outside the Islamic religion, and there is no Muslim who does not praise Ali, Fatima al-Zahra, Hassan, Hussein and the Ahl al-Bayt, so all Muslims are Sunnis because all Muslims follow the sunnah and all Muslims are Shi'as because all Muslims follow Ali and Ahl al-Bayt".

There were also claims, such as by Colonel Saleh Mansour al-Obeidi, that Gaddafi believed in African magic by his later life. According to these claims, the Libyan leader owned amulets and other allegedly magical items, and employed magicians from a number of African countries to ward off defeat in the Libyan Civil War.

== Interests ==
He was a football enthusiast and enjoyed playing football, as well as enjoying horseback riding as a means of recreation. He regarded himself as an intellectual; he was a fan of Beethoven and said his favourite novels were Uncle Tom's Cabin, Roots, and The Outsider.

Pargeter also argued that "perpetual revolution was his enduring passion", as he remained privately fascinated with attempts to spread his political views across the world, particularly in Africa. Gaddafi's personal hero was Gamal Abdel Nasser.

== Appearance ==
Gaddafi regarded personal appearance as important, with Blundy and Lycett referring to him as "extraordinarily vain." Two Brazilian plastic surgeons, Liacyr Ribeiro and Fabio Naccache, claimed they were hired by Gaddafi in 1994 to perform a hair transplant and inject belly fat into Gaddafi's face to help him look younger. At one point, he claimed that he received a lot of fan mail from American women as they liked his hair.

=== Clothing ===
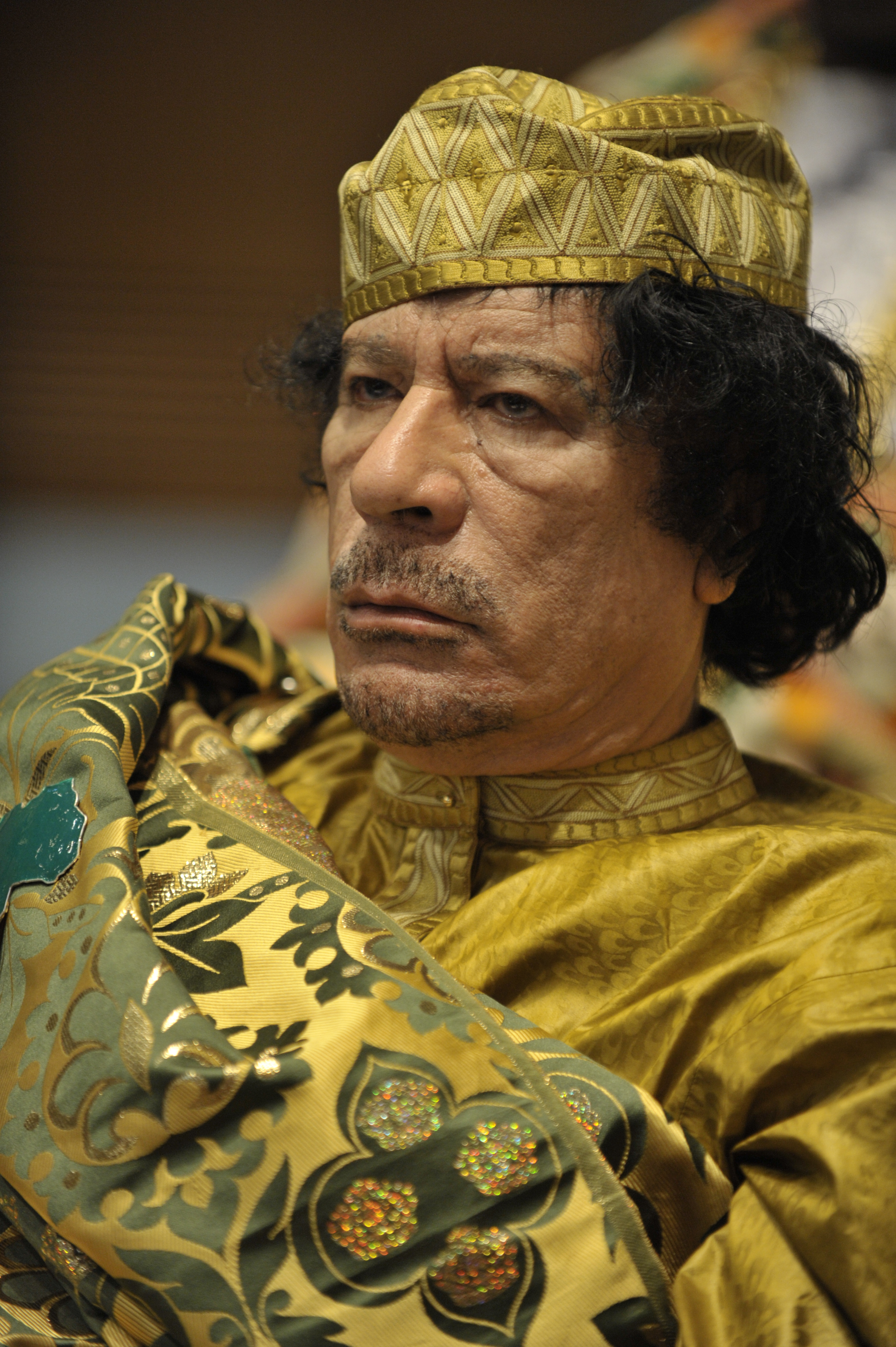
Gaddafi at the 12th African Union summit in 2009.

Gaddafi had a large wardrobe, and sometimes changed his outfit multiple times a day. He favoured either a military uniform or traditional Libyan dress, tending to eschew Western-style suits. He saw himself as a fashion icon, stating "Whatever I wear becomes a fad. I wear a certain shirt and suddenly everyone is wearing it." Gaddafi's wardrobe was the subject of significant press coverage over the years which was criticized as distracting from serious coverage of Libya.

In 2009 Vanity Fair wrote "Since completing his transition from international pariah to statesman, Colonel Muammar Qaddafi—the longest-serving leader in both Africa and the Arab world—has brought color and his own eccentric panache to the drab circuit of international summits and conferences. Drawing upon the influences of Lacroix, Liberace, Phil Spector (for hair), Snoopy, and Idi Amin, Libya’s leader—now in his 60s—is simply the most unabashed dresser on the world stage. We pay homage to a sartorial genius of our time."

In 2011 during the revolution Gaddafi invited the New York Times to Tripoli to see his clothing collection.

Gaddafi was the fashion inspiration for the 2012 Sacha Baron Cohen movie The Dictator. In an interview with CBS he said "Col. Qaddafi was kind of the most absurd of the dictators... Obviously vicious, but he would dress unintentionally like a 65-year-old woman."

== Residences ==
Following his ascension to power, Gaddafi moved into the Bab al-Azizia barracks, a 6-square-kilometre (2.3 square miles) fortified compound located 3.2 kilometres (2 miles) from the centre of Tripoli. His home and office at Azizia was a bunker designed by West German engineers, while the rest of his family lived in a large two-storey building. Within the compound were also two tennis courts, a football pitch, several gardens, camels and a Bedouin tent in which he entertained guests. In the 1980s, his lifestyle was considered modest in comparison to those of many other Arab leaders.

== Security ==
He was preoccupied with his own security, regularly changing where he slept and sometimes grounding all other planes in Libya when he was flying. He made particular requests when travelling to foreign countries. During his trips to Rome, Paris, Madrid, Moscow, and New York City, he resided in a bulletproof tent, following his Bedouin traditions. Gaddafi was notably confrontational in his approach to foreign powers and generally shunned Western ambassadors and diplomats, believing them to be spies.

== Entourage ==
In the 1970s and 1980s, there were reports of his making sexual advances toward female reporters and members of his entourage. Starting in the 1980s, he travelled with his all-female Amazonian Guard, who were allegedly sworn to a life of celibacy. After Gaddafi's death, the Libyan psychologist Seham Sergewa, part of a team investigating sexual offences during the civil war, stated that five of the guards told her they had been raped by Gaddafi and senior officials.

After Gaddafi's death, the French journalist Annick Cojean published a book alleging that Gaddafi had had sexual relations with women, some in their early teenage years, who had been specially selected for him. One of those Cojean interviewed, a woman named Soraya, claimed that Gaddafi kept her imprisoned in a basement for six years, where he repeatedly raped her, urinated on her, and forced her to watch pornography, drink alcohol, and snort cocaine. The alleged sexual abuse was said to have been facilitated by Gaddafi's Chief of Protocol Nuri al-Mismari and Mabrouka Sherif. Gaddafi also hired several Ukrainian nurses to care for him; one described him as kind and considerate and was surprised that allegations of abuse had been made against him.

== Family ==
Gaddafi was born into the Qadhadhfa tribe, which is a Arabized Berber tribal group. His mother was named Aisha (died 1978), and his father, Mohammad Abdul Salam bin Hamed bin Mohammad, was known as Abu Meniar (died 1985). His father was a goat and camel herder before Gaddafi's seizure of power. He was his parents' only surviving son, but had three older sisters. By 1987, one of his sisters had died of cancer, one had married a Sirte native, and a third had married Messaoud Abdul Hafez, at one point governor of Fezzan.

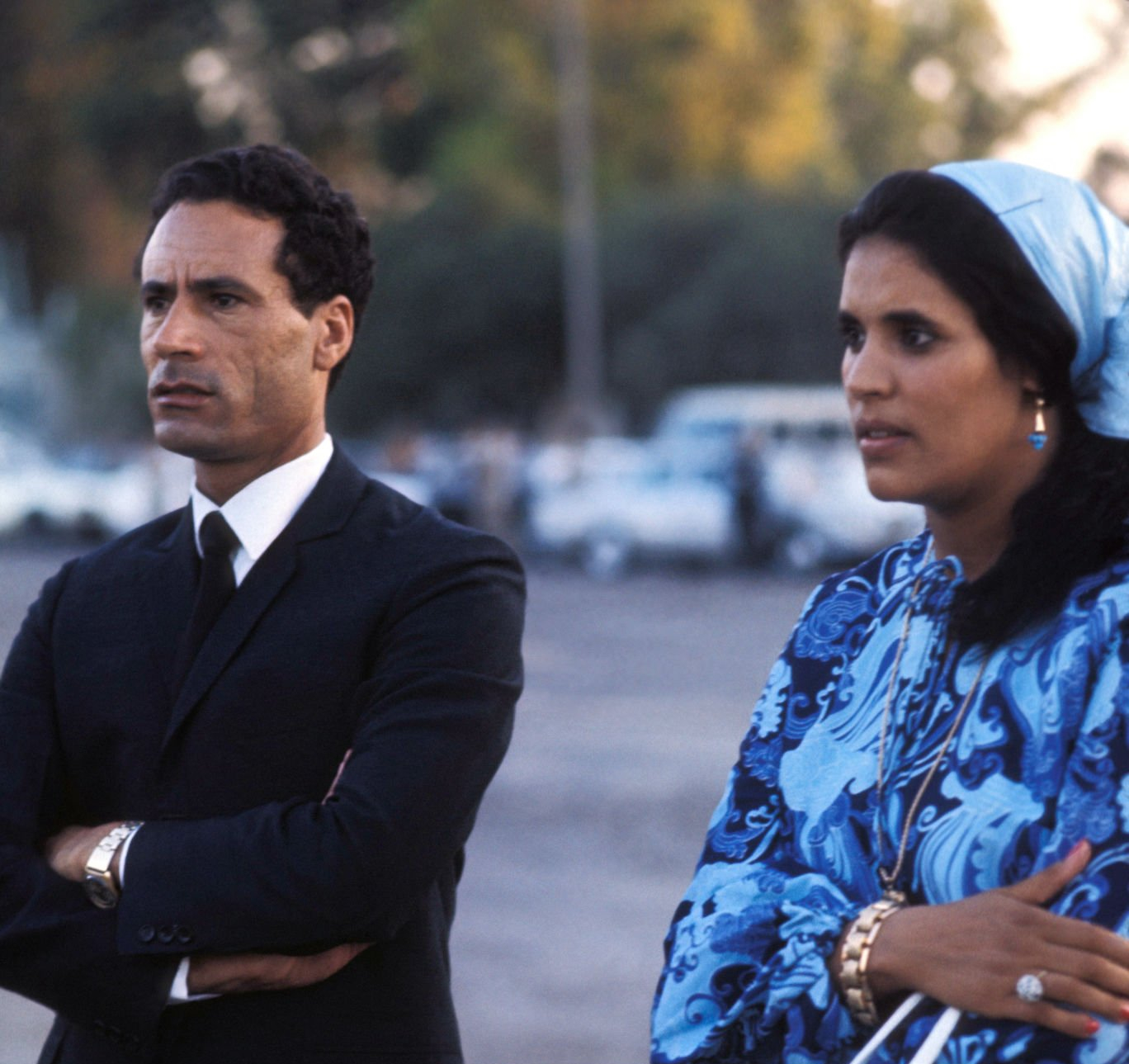
Gaddafi and his wife Safia Farkash in 1970.

Gaddafi married his first wife, Fatiha al-Nuri, in 1969, shortly after the revolution. She was the daughter of General Khalid, a senior figure in King Idris's administration, and was from a middle-class background, having been a former school teacher. Although they had one son, Muhammad Gaddafi (born 1970), their relationship was strained, and they divorced in 1970. Gaddafi said he never met al-Nuri until the day of their marriage, in line with tradition, and that she was "not my dream girl". Gaddafi's second wife was Safia Farkash, née el-Brasai, a former nurse from the Obeidat tribe born in Bayda. They met in 1969, following his ascension to power, when he was hospitalized with appendicitis; he claimed that it was love at first sight. The couple remained married until his death. Together they had seven biological children: Saif al-Islam Gaddafi (1972–2026), Al-Saadi Gaddafi (born 1973), Mutassim Gaddafi (1974–2011), Hannibal Muammar Gaddafi (born 1975), Ayesha Gaddafi (born 1976), Saif al-Arab Gaddafi (1982–2011), and Khamis Gaddafi (1983–2011). He also adopted two children, Hana Gaddafi and Milad Gaddafi. Several of his sons gained a reputation for lavish and anti-social behaviour in Libya, which proved a source of resentment toward his administration. Gaddafi openly criticized his children's lavish spending, corruption, and westernized life, though he never managed to control their behavior.

Some of Gaddafi's nephews and cousins held important positions: Ahmed Gaddaf al-Dam served as high-ranking military commander, overseer of the Tobruk (and later Cyrenaica) military region, and Special Envoy to Egypt and a leading figure of the Gaddafi regime as well as a key member of Gaddafi's inner circle. Sayyid Gaddaf al-Dam was a high-ranking political control officer in Sirte, described as the second most powerful person in Libya in the 1980s, and general coordinator of the Social People's Leadership Committees since 2004. Khalifa Haaish acted as Gaddafi's bodyguard and helped to suppress the 1993 Libyan coup d'état attempt; later he became responsible for weapons procurement. Hassan Ishkal was head of the Sirte military region, but executed in 1985 due to internal power struggles. His cousin Mansour Dhao was his chief of security.

Several in-laws of Gaddafi also held high positions. One notable example was Abdullah Senussi, husband of Safia Farkash's sister. He was one of the members of Gaddafi's inner circle, identified as a planner of the UTA Flight 772 attack, and head of the Mukhabarat el-Jamahiriya (Jamahiriya Security Organisation) from 1992.
