= Politics of Libya =

The politics of Libya have been in an uncertain state since the collapse of long-time dictator Muammar Gaddafi's Libyan Arab Jamahiriya in 2011, with various political bodies, jihadist groups and tribal elements fighting for control over the country's territory.

Since the 2014 general election, the eastern and western halves of the country have been under the control of different rival governmental authorities. The west, including the capital city Tripoli, is controlled by the UN-recognized interim Government of National Unity (GNU), formed in 2021 and led by Prime Minister Abdul Hamid Al-Dabiba. The east is controlled by the rival Government of National Stability (GNS), supported by the House of Representatives and its leader Osama Hammad, and backed militarily by the Libyan Arab Armed Forces and its commander Khalifa Haftar. In the east, the authority of Khalifa Haftar and the Libyan Arab Armed Forces is relatively consolidated. However, in the west, the ruling GNU struggles to maintain power as rival factions, including jihadist groups, compete for influence.

In april 2026, some small breakthroughs were made as the GNS and the GNU agreed on a common budget of 190 billion dinars for the country, for the first time since 2013. However, the current situation can generally be described as a stalemate, as the UNSMIL mission's attempt at establishing dialogue and organising national elections did not lead to concrete results. The influence of external actors, including support to rival factions from foreign powers such as Egypt, Russia, Turkey and the United Arab Emirates, complicates and entrenches the conflict further.

== History ==
Evolution in the V-Dem Democracy Indices for Libyan electoral and liberal democracy since the 1940s.

=== Gaddafi Era ===
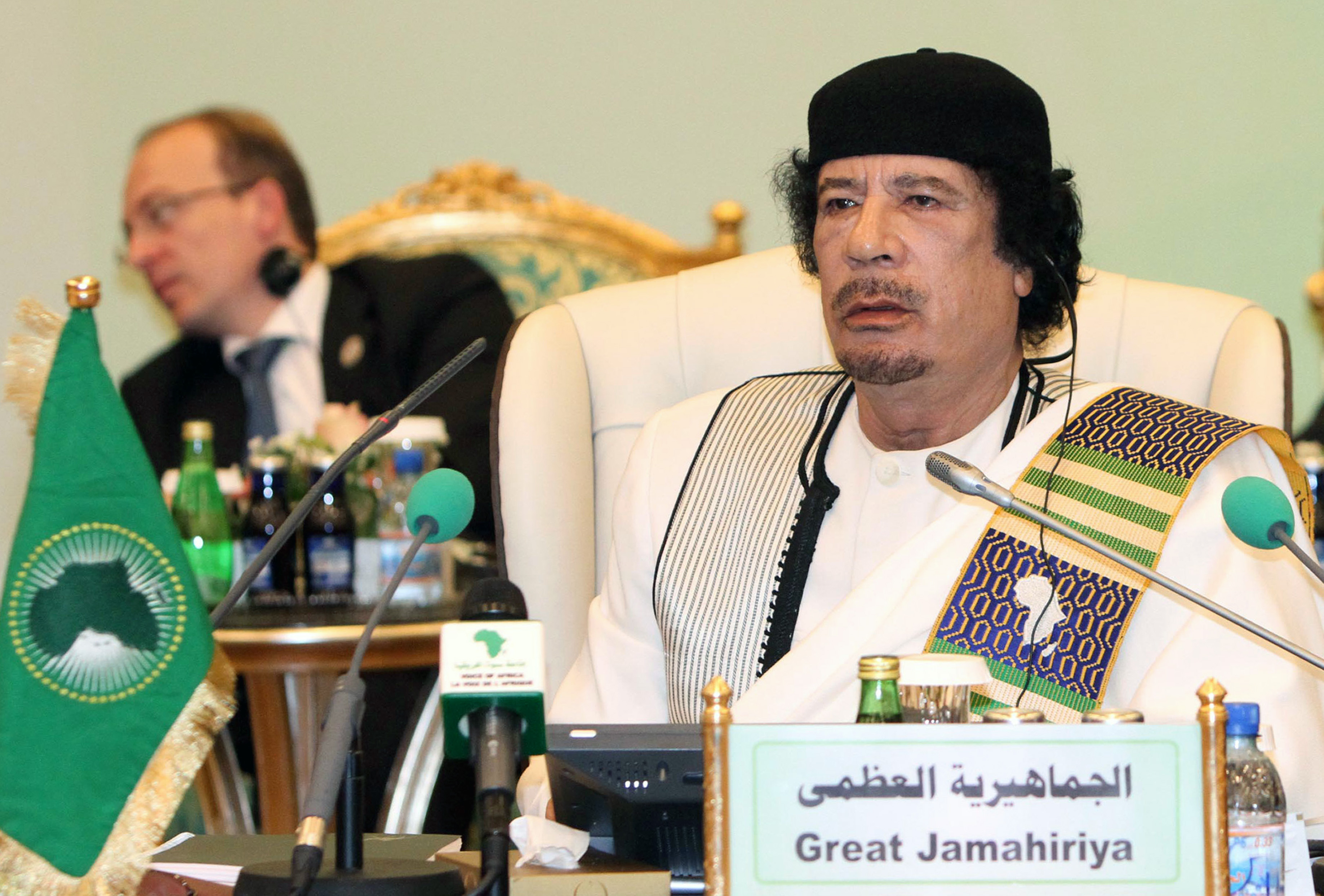
Muammar Gaddafi in 2010

After originally rising to power through a military coup d'état in 1969, Colonel Muammar Gaddafi's governance of Libya became increasingly centric on the teachings of his Green Book, which he published in the mid-1970s chapter by chapter as a foundation for a new form of government. This jamahiriya, as he called it, was supposedly a form of direct democracy in which power was balanced between a General People's Congress, consisting of 2,700 representatives of Basic People's Congresses, and an executive General People's Committee, headed by a General Secretary, who reported to the prime minister and the president. However, Gaddafi retained virtually all power, continuing to operate and control vestiges of the military junta put in place in 1969.

Gaddafi's authoritarian rule, a transition from the former monarchical structure, aligns with Samuels' finding that most military coups spark change from one form of non-democratic government to another. Gaddafi acted as a military/personalist leader during his 42-year reign, nearly tripling the average ruling length of 15.1 years for this regime type, as found by political scientist Barbara Geddes in her 1999 publication. Still, Gaddafi's regime did follow many of the military/personalist tropes that Geddes outlined: failing after its leader's death, relying on unstable personal networks to rule, and facing military opposition during the reign.

As an oil-rich state with an abundance of petro-dollars, Gaddafi's rule did not require political appeasement from citizens, since the government derived means of power through oil wealth. The first human rights report against the Gaddafi Foundation was submitted in 1999 in hopes of immediate reform. Unfortunately, reports were periodically submitted over the following 10 years, with a notable Human Rights Watch report in December 2009, and ultimately intensified repression from Gaddafi's regime. Namely, in response to the 2009 report, Gaddafi banned all civil society organizations, closed newspapers, and arrested journalists speaking out against the regime's corruption and abuse of its citizens. Apart from being an oil economy, Gaddafi's shallow state constructed weak governance capacity within security structures, institutions, and bureaucracy. Overall, Gaddafi exemplified the strategy of systemically overpowering opposition and obstructing civil society formation, and his repressive rule allowed for him to deconstruct state structures and security, forcing the state to be rebuilt after his downfall.

=== Crisis and civil war ===
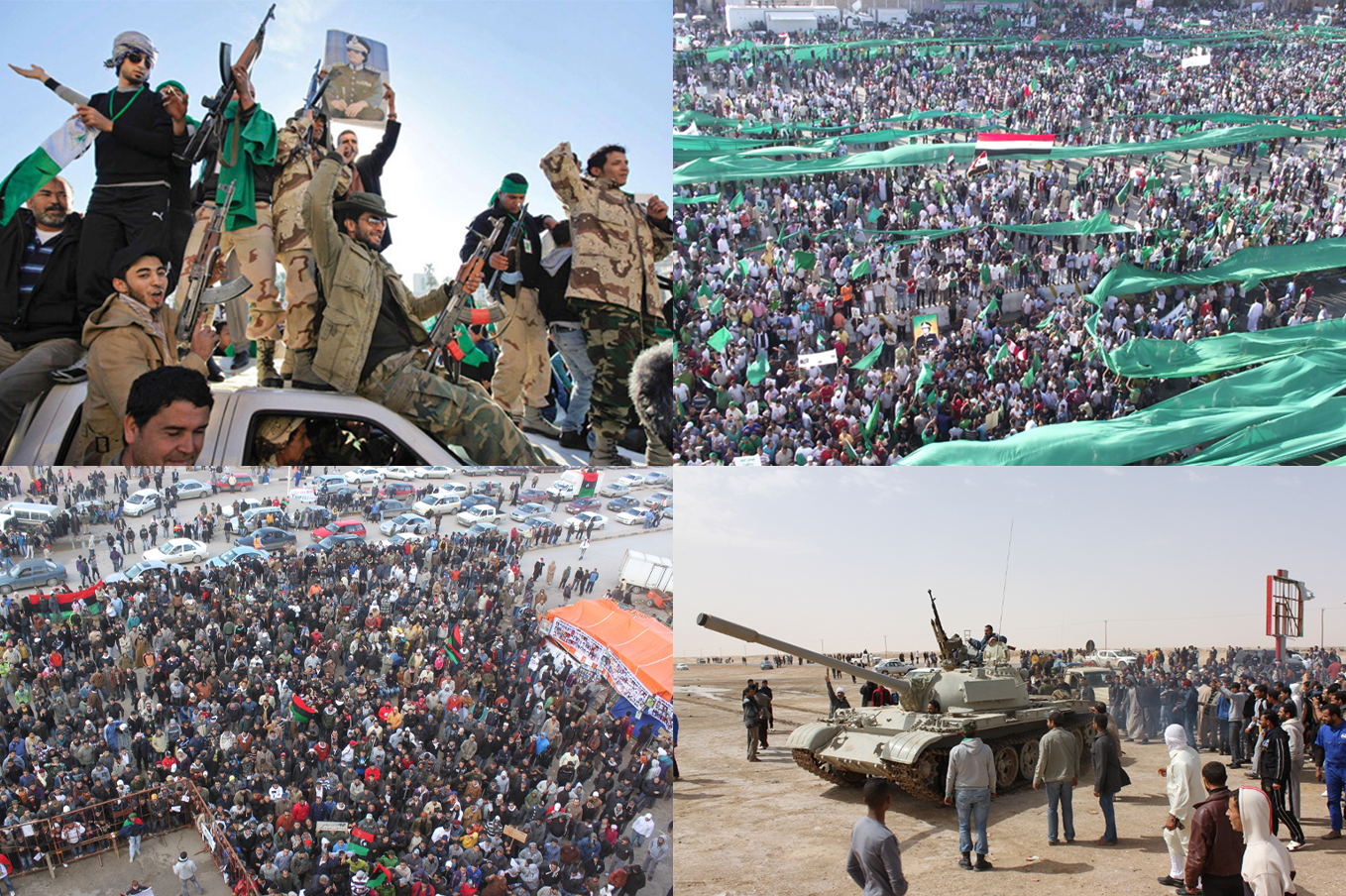
Pro-Jamahiriya and NTC opposition groups in Libyan Civil War (2011)

The Libyan revolt of 2011 that ultimately ended Gaddafi's reign was partially inspired by both Tunisia and Egypt's attempted democratization, demonstrating the neighborhood effect: a theory that postulates countries will be influenced by their neighbors when adopting regime types. The political divide and pressure from groups with differing religious, regional, or ethnic affiliations and goals for the country contributed to the overthrow of Gaddafi, as well as the collapse of the Libyan Arab Jamahiriya in 2011, an economic model which rejects capitalism and favors a stateless and socialist society. Despite its anti-western position, this economic model relied on foreign trade, weaponry, and technology to sustain totalitarian control; this model facilitated wealth disparities and the centralization of power, while deconstructing state and social institutions. These uprisings temporarily unified the disparate groups within Libya. Although, the flaws in institutions left by Gaddafi brought back the divide within various religious, regional, and ethnic groups. Ultimately, the unrest following Gaddafi's ousting led to Libya's recent civil war and various jihadists and tribal elements controlling parts of the country.

==== National Transitional Council ====
Political parties were banned in Libya from 1972 until the removal of Gaddafi's government, and all elections were nonpartisan under law. However, during the revolution, the National Transitional Council (NTC), a body formed on 27 February 2011 by anti-Gaddafi forces to act as the "political face of the revolution", made the introduction of multiparty democracy a cornerstone of its agenda. In June 2011, Saif al-Islam Gaddafi said his father would agree to internationally monitored general elections, and would step down if he lost them, but his offer was refused in face of the Resolution 1970, which referred Gaddafi, his family, and his security entourage to the International Criminal Court as a result of war crimes and crimes against humanity.

On 8 March, the NTC issued a statement in which it declared itself to be the "sole representative all over Libya". The council formed an interim governing body on 23 March. As of 20 October 2011, with the support and protection of NATO, the NTC captured Muammar Gaddafi, where he was subsequently killed in a cross-fire. As an immediate result, 100 countries declared full support to the council by severing all relations with Gaddafi's rule and recognizing the National Transitional Council as the "rightful representative of Libya".

On 3 August 2011, the NTC issued a Constitutional Declaration which declared the statehood of Libya as a democracy with Islam as its state religion, in which the state guarantees the rule of law and an independent judiciary as well as civic and human basic rights (including freedom of religion and women's rights), and which contains provisions for a phase of transition to a presidential republic with an elected national assembly and a democratically legitimized constitution by 2013. The drafting of the constitution is particularly difficult considering the different interests of the shareholders involved. Vice Chairman Abdul Hafiz Ghoga declared Libya to be "liberated" on 23 October 2011, announcing an official end to the war. Chairman Mustafa Abdul Jalil said Libya would become an Islamic democracy in the wake of Gaddafi's death, though the extent of Islamic law's influence would be determined by elected lawmakers. Ghoga later confirmed that Libya will continue to adhere to all international agreements to which it was signatory prior to the uprising.

The National Transitional Council only possessed moral, legal, and ethical authority, while Libya's opposing militias had access to a large supply of arms and local networks. This deepened the loyalties of many localities with the militias, ultimately granting these militias as de facto political authority.

On 7 July 2012 an election was held for the General National Congress (GNC) to replace the NTC. There were 2,501 candidates for the 200 seats – 136 for political parties and 64 for independent candidates. About 300 candidates' views were considered unacceptable and removed from candidates list, suspected of sympathizing with the defeated forces of the Jamahiriya. Accreditation centers have also been organized in European cities with larger Libyan communities like Berlin and Paris, in order to allow Libyan nationals, there to cast their vote. On 8 August 2012 the NTC officially dissolved and transferred power to the General National Congress.

Libya is divided into two rival governmental authorities in the years following Gaddafi's overthrow. The governmental authorities include the Islamist-led General National Congress (GNC) and its militia coalition the Libya Dawn, which is based in Tripoli, and the House of Representatives in Tobruk, with its military coalition named Operation Dignity. Although, it is vital to note that these militias held military power independently of the authorities to which they claimed loyalty. As a result, outbreaks of violence continued across the region, as governments could not convince their militias to allow a state-imposed monopoly on violence.

==== General National Congress ====
The General National Congress (also translated as General National Council) was the legislative authority of Libya. It was elected by popular vote on 7 July 2012, and from 8 August replaced the National Transitional Council that had governed the country since the end of the Libyan Civil War. The General National Congress was composed of 200 members of which 80 were elected through a party list system of proportional representation, and 120 were elected as independents in multiple-member districts.

Although it claimed a provisional sort of sovereign authority over Libya, the General National Congress was not permitted to take actions like those of a true sovereign and legitimate state; General National Congress did not have Weberian monopoly of force and could not enforce many of its said plans of action. Although, at the time, no other political body had clearly claimed to possess authority to govern Libya.

The executive branch was appointed by the GNC and led by the prime minister, Fayez-al-Sarraj, while the president of the GNC was the de facto head of state, though not explicitly described as such in the Declaration.

The main responsibility of the GNC was to form a constituent assembly which would write Libya's permanent constitution, for approval by a referendum. The GNC was unable to choose how this assembly would be elected until they brought the amendment to the Temporary Constitutional Declaration, a document serving as a temporary constitution during the transitional period post-Gadhafi. Accordingly, the GNC decided the method of direct elections to be more efficient in creating this assembly, as they believed it would also please federalist rivals like the House of Representatives, and create progress in the political process.

On 30 March 2014, the General National Congress voted to replace itself with a new House of Representatives. The new legislature would allocate 30 seats for women, would have 200 seats overall (with individuals able to run as members of political parties) and allow Libyans of foreign nationalities to run for office. While elections were held and lawmakers took office, the former General National Congress rejected the results and reconvened in opposition to the new parliament, which now meets in the eastern Libyan city of Tobruk.

==== House of Representatives ====
The House of Representatives was formed following June 2014 elections, when the General National Congress formed as a transitional body after the Libyan Revolution dissolved. The House of Representatives controls the Libyan National Army, known to be the country's most effective and coordinated armed organization, as well as controls oil ports. The control that the House of Representatives has on the country's oil reserves has played a role in changing the dynamic of Libya's politics, especially since the General National Assembly has the right to sell the oil in states which legitimize it as Libya's sole government.

However, Islamists fared poorly in the low-turnout elections, and members of the Islamist-led GNC reconvened in August 2014, refusing to recognize the new parliament dominated by secularist and federalist lawmakers. Libya Dawn, the militia coalition of the New General National Congress swiftly seized control of Tripoli, Libya's constitutional capital, forcing the newly elected parliament of the House of Representatives into virtual exile in Tobruk, near the Egyptian border. However, The House of Representatives enjoys widespread international recognition as Libya's official government, and controls the Libyan National Army. However, the Tripoli-based Supreme Court declared it illegal and voided the results of the election in November 2014. The court ruling was hailed by the GNC and its backers, but it was rejected as invalid by the House of Representatives and its loyalists.

Against this backdrop of division, the Islamic State of Iraq and the Levant and Ansar al-Sharia, as well as other militant groups both religious and tribal in nature, have seized control of several cities and districts across Libya, especially in Cyrenaica, which is theoretically under the control of the Tobruk-based government.

A number of commentators have described Libya as a failed state or suggested it is on the verge of failure.

=== Attempts for unity ===
Due to the civil unrest between the two parliaments, the GNC and House of Representatives rejected around seven proposals of a power-sharing transitional constitution. In early December 2015 both parliaments, the GNC and the House of Representatives, agreed a declaration of principles calling for the formation of a joint ten-person committee to name an interim prime minister and two deputies, leading to new elections within two years. As a result, the Libyan Political Agreement (LPA) was adopted on December 13, 2015. Under the terms of the agreement, a nine-member Presidential Council and a seventeen-member interim Government of National Accord (GNA) was formed to replace the GNC, with a view to holding new elections within two years. The House of Representatives would continue to exist as a legislative power, including the authority to approve ministerial cabinet proposed by the GNA, and importantly, the authority to activate the LPA.

This attempt at unification was unsuccessful, since Libya dawn would only accept under the condition of gaining control over Tripoli and the central bank, which was refused by the House of Representatives as they believed it would grant too large a share of power than it would through elections. As a result, the General National Assembly and House of Representatives are in a state of constitutional limbo, as the latter has not officially approved the LPA, and thus it is unclear to both parties, and the rest of society, whether the LPA is active. Three competing governments still remained by the end of 2016, disputes between which continuing until the formation of the GNU in 2015. Still, even with the establishment of this governmental structure, widespread human rights abuses exist throughout the country to this day; this is due to the lack of a central government to regulate the ten years of conflict that ensued after Gaddafi's reign. However, the country has made some "democratic" progress: Libya's score was trending upwards from 2011 to 2013 on the PolityIV authority trends scale, increasing from a -7 to a 1, shifting its categorization from "autocracy" to "anocracy."

In March 2021, the interim Government of National Unity (GNU), unifying the Second Al-Thani Cabinet and the Government of National Accord was formed, only to face new opposition in Government of National Stability, until Libyan Political Dialogue Forum assured the ongoing ceasefire.

== Political parties and elections ==
On 7 July 2012, the General National Congress, a new legislative body, was elected. It was replaced by a new House of Representatives in 2014.

Municipal elections were held in 2011–2012, 2014, 2019–2021, and 2024–2026.

=== List of parties with seats in the General National Congress ===
- National Forces Alliance
- Justice & Construction
- National Front
- Wadi al-Hiya Alliance
- Union for Homeland
- National Centrist Party
- Libyan National Democratic Party
- The Message
- The Foundation
- National Party for Development and Welfare
- Nation & Prosperity
- Authenticity & Renewal
- Authenticity & Progress
- Moderate Umma Assembly
- Libik Watani
- National Gathering of Wadi al-Shati
- Moderate Youth Party
- Libyan List for Freedom & Development
- National Coalition of Parties
- Libya the Hope
- Wisdom Party.

=== List of parties without seats in the General National Congress ===
- Libyan Popular National Movement
- Democratic Party
- Homeland Party
- Party of Reform and Development
- Libyan Constitutional Union
- Libyan Amazigh Congress
- Alhaq and Democracy Party of Benghazi
- Libyan National Congress Party
- New Libya Party
- National Unity of Libya Party
- Freedom and Development Party of Libya
- The Patriotic Reform Party
- National Solidarity Party
- The Libyan National Party
- Umma Party
- Justice and Democracy Party of Libya
- Libya Future Party
- Libyan Center Party
- National Democratic Assembly for Justice and Progress
- Libya Development Party
- Libyan Universal Party
- National Democratic Alliance
- New National Congress Party
- Tawasul Party
- Libyan National Democratic Party for Justice and Development
- Libya Our Home and Tribe Party
- Libyan Liberation Party
- Libya for All Party
- Popular Front for the Liberation of Libya
- Unity Movement
- Democratic Youth Party
- National Democratic Assembly
- Wefaq Party
- Libyan National Democratic Assemblage
- Ansar Al Horria
- Libyan Unionist Party.

== Foreign relations ==
The National Transitional Council has pledged to honor Libya's international commitments until the 2012 elections.

Libya is a member of ABEDA, AfDB, AFESD, AL, AMF, AMU, AU, CAEU, ECA, FAO, G-77, IAEA, IBRD, ICAO, IDA, IDB, IFAD, IFC, IFRCS, ILO, IMF, IMO, Inmarsat, Intelsat, Interpol, IOC, ISO, ITU, NAM, OAPEC, OIC, OPEC, PCA, UN, UNCTAD, UNESCO, UNHRC (suspended), UNIDO, UPU, WCO, WFTU, WHO, WIPO, WMO, UNWTO and UNHABITAT.

=== Wanted figures ===
Interpol on 4 March 2011 issued a security alert concerning the "possible movement of dangerous individuals and assets" based on United Nations Security Council Resolution 1970, which imposed a travel ban and asset freeze. The warning lists Gaddafi himself and 15 key members of his government:

1. Muammar Gaddafi: Responsibility for ordering repression of demonstrations, human rights abuses. *Killed 20 October 2011 in Sirte*
2. Dr. Baghdadi Mahmudi: Head of the Liaison Office of the Revolutionary Committees. Revolutionary Committees involved in violence against demonstrators.
3. Abuzed Omar Dorda: Director, External Security Organization. Government loyalist. Head of external intelligence agency.
4. Major-General Abu-Bakr Yunis Jabr: Defense Minister. Overall responsibility for actions of armed forces. *Killed 20 October 2011 in Sirte*
5. Ayesha Gaddafi: Daughter of Muammar Gaddafi. Closeness of association with government.
6. Hannibal Muammar Gaddafi: Son of Muammar Gaddafi. Closeness of association with government.
7. Mutassim Gaddafi: National Security Adviser. Son of Muammar Gaddafi. Closeness of association with government. *Killed 20 October 2011 in Sirte*
8. Al-Saadi Gaddafi: Commander Special Forces. Son of Muammar Gaddafi. Closeness of association with government. Command of military units involved in repression of demonstrations.
9. Saif al-Islam Gaddafi: Director, Gaddafi Foundation. Son of Muammar Gaddafi. Closeness of association with government. Inflammatory public statements encouraging violence against demonstrators.
10. Abdulqader Yusef Dibri: Head of Muammar Gaddafi's personal security. Responsibility for government security. History of directing violence against dissidents.
11. Matuq Mohammed Matuq: Secretary for Utilities. Senior member of government. Involvement with Revolutionary Committees. Past history of involvement in suppression of dissent and violence.
12. Sayyid Mohammed Qadhaf Al-dam: Cousin of Muammar Gaddafi. In the 1980s, Sayyid was involved in the dissident assassination campaign and allegedly responsible for several deaths in Europe. He is also thought to have been involved in arms procurement.
13. Khamis Gaddafi: Son of Muammar Gaddafi. Closeness of association with government. Command of military units involved in repression of demonstrations.
14. Muhammad Gaddafi: Son of Muammar Gaddafi. Closeness of association with government.
15. Saif al-Arab Gaddafi: Son of Muammar Gaddafi. Closeness of association with government.
16. Colonel Abdullah Senussi: Director Military Intelligence. Military Intelligence involvement in suppression of demonstrations. Past history includes suspicion of involvement in Abu Selim prison massacre. Convicted in absentia for bombing of UTA flight. Brother-in-law of Muammar Gaddafi.

The NTC has been in negotiations with Algeria and Niger, neighboring countries to which members of the government and defecting military commanders have fled, attempting to secure the arrest and extradition of Al-Saadi Gaddafi and others.

Of these officials, Baghdadi Mahmudi and Abuzed Omar Dorda were arrested, while Saif al-Arab Gaddafi was killed by a NATO airstrike during the war, Khamis Gaddafi was killed in action after the fall of Tripoli, and Muammar and Mutassim Gaddafi, as well as Abu-Bakr Yunis Jabr, were killed during the fall of Sirte.

== See also ==
- Green Resistance
- General People's Committee of Libya
- List of diplomatic missions of Libya
