= United Nations Security Council Resolution 1970 =

UN Security Council Resolution 1970
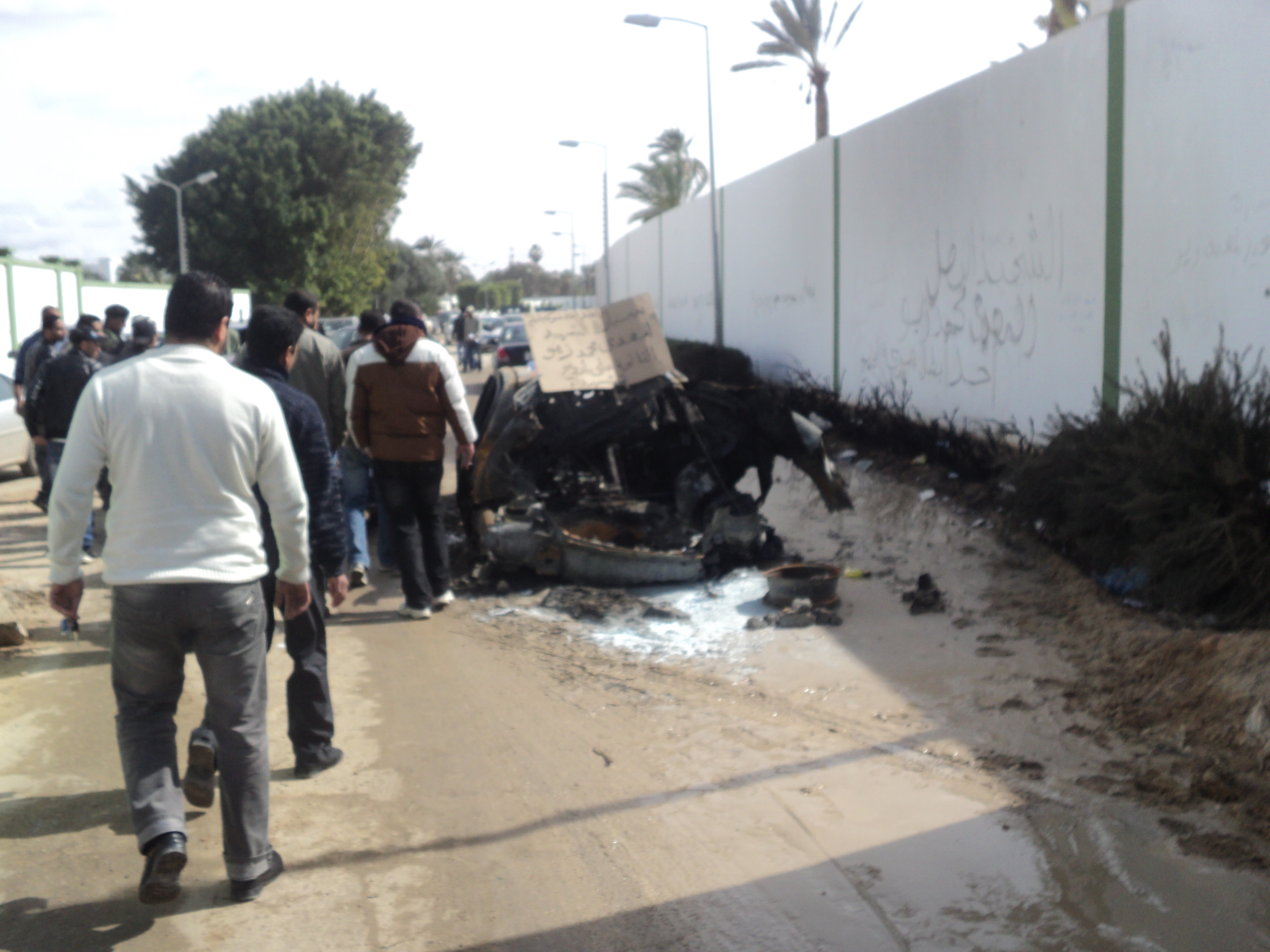
- Libyan opposition in Benghazi during the uprising
- Date: 26 February 2011
- Meeting no.: 6,491
- Code: S/RES/1970 (Document)
- Subject: Peace and security in Africa
- Voting summary: 15 voted for; None voted against; None abstained
- Result: Adopted

Security Council composition
- Permanent members: China; France; Russia; United Kingdom; United States
- Non-permanent members: Bosnia–Herzegovina; Brazil; Colombia; Germany; Gabon; India; Lebanon; Nigeria; Portugal; South Africa

United Nations Security Council Resolution 1970 was a measure adopted unanimously by the UN Security Council on 26 February 2011. It condemned the use of lethal force by the government of Muammar Gaddafi against protesters participating in the Libyan Civil War, and imposed a series of international sanctions in response.

The Security Council resolution marked the first time a country was unanimously referred to the International Criminal Court by the council.

It has been alleged by Le Figaro that France openly violated the resolution by parachuting weapons to Libyan rebels (see lower).

== Background ==
During the Libyan civil war, Gaddafi's loyalist forces allegedly carried out aerial bombings in Tripoli over civilian protesters, which drew widespread condemnation. However, these massacres likely never took place. Nonetheless, under pressure from mutinying Libyan diplomats the UN was brought to act.

== Adoption ==
Resolution 1970, proposed by France, Germany, the United Kingdom and the United States, was adopted after a day-long discussion. Libyan Ambassador to the United Nations Abdurrahman Mohamed Shalgam, who defected from the Libyan government, appealed to the Security Council to act on the situation in Libya. He persuaded China, India and Russia to include a reference to the International Criminal Court, after they previously expressed concern that it could inflame the situation. Russia secured a provision preventing nations from using the resolution as a pretext for intervention in Libya. Another provision proposed by Libyan representatives to include a no-fly zone over the country was rejected. The Security Council unanimously adopted resolution 1970 on 26 February 2011, making explicit reference to the Responsibility to protect. Under resolution 1973, Libya was the first case where the Security Council authorized a military intervention citing the R2P.

== Voting ==
Approved (15)	Abstained (0)	Opposed (0)
**United States**; **United Kingdom**; Gabon; Colombia; Nigeria; **France**; Bosnia and Herzegovina; Portugal; South Africa; Lebanon; India; **China**; Germany; Brazil; **Russia**		

* Permanent members of the Security Council are in bold.

== Resolution ==
=== Observations ===
In the introduction of the resolution, the Council expressed "grave concern" at the situation in Libya and condemned the use of force against civilians. It also condemned the repression and violations of human rights, and attempts by the Libyan government to incite violence; statements of condemnation from the Arab League, African Union, Organisation of the Islamic Conference and United Nations Human Rights Council were welcomed by the Council. Such attacks on protesters were considered to amount to crimes against humanity.

There was concern at the refugee situation, a shortage of medical supplies and the welfare of foreign nationals. The Security Council recalled the Libyan government's responsibility to protect its people, respect the freedoms of assembly, expression and a free media. Additionally, the government was reminded of the need to bring those responsible for attacks on civilians to account.

The text of the resolution recalled article 16 of the Rome Statute under which no investigation or prosecution may be commenced or proceeded with by the International Criminal Court for a period of 12 months after a Security Council request to that effect.

=== Acts ===
The remainder of the resolution was enacted under Chapter VII of the United Nations Charter and Article 41, thus making its provisions legally enforceable.

The Council demanded an immediate end to the violence in Libya and for the government to address the "legitimate demands of the population". It urged the authorities to respect international humanitarian and human rights law, act with restraint, ensure the safety of foreign nationals and humanitarian supplies and lift restrictions placed on the media. International co-operation was advised to evacuate foreign nationals from the country.

The resolution then referred the situation in Libya to the Prosecutor of the International Criminal Court, who was to address the Council within two months following the adoption of Resolution 1970 and every six months thereafter on action taken, further deciding that Libyan officials should fully co-operate with the Court. An arms embargo was also imposed, preventing weapons from being exported to or out of Libya. States neighbouring Libya were encouraged to inspect suspicious cargo for weapons and to seize any found, while they were also called upon to prevent mercenaries from being used in the uprising. Furthermore, a travel ban and asset freeze was imposed on individuals both in and closely linked to Gaddafi's government; any frozen assets would be made available to benefit the population.

The Security Council established a Committee to monitor the implementation of the sanctions, investigate violations and to impose targeted sanctions on additional individuals and entities. All states were called upon to facilitate humanitarian assistance to Libya. The resolution concluded with the Council stating its intention to review, modify, strengthen or lift the measures in light of the situation.

==== Travel ban ====
The following members of the Gaddafi government were subjects of the travel ban:

- Dr Baghdadi Mahmudi, Head of the Liaison Office of the Revolutionary Committees
- Abdulqader Yusef Dibri, Head of Muammar Gaddafi's personal security, responsible for government security
- Abuzed Omar Dorda, Director of the External Security Organisation
- Major General Abu-Bakr Yunis Jabr, Defence Minister
- Matuq Mohammed Matuq, Secretary for Utilities
- Sayyid Mohammed Qadhaf Al-dam, cousin of Muammar Gaddafi
- Ayesha Gaddafi, daughter of Muammar Gaddafi
- Hannibal Muammar Gaddafi, son of Muammar Gaddafi
- Khamis Gaddafi, son of Muammar Gaddafi and leader of the Khamis Brigade
- Muhammad Gaddafi, son of Muammar Gaddafi
- Muammar Gaddafi, Leader of the Revolution, Supreme Commander of the Armed Forces
- Mutassim Gaddafi, National Security Adviser, son of Muammar Gaddafi
- Al-Saadi Gaddafi, Commander of Special Forces, son of Muammar Gaddafi
- Saif al-Arab Gaddafi, son of Muammar Gaddafi
- Saif al-Islam Gaddafi, Director of the Gaddafi Foundation, son of Muammar Gaddafi
- Colonel Abdullah Senussi, Director of Military Intelligence, brother-in-law of Muammar Gaddafi

==== Asset freeze ====
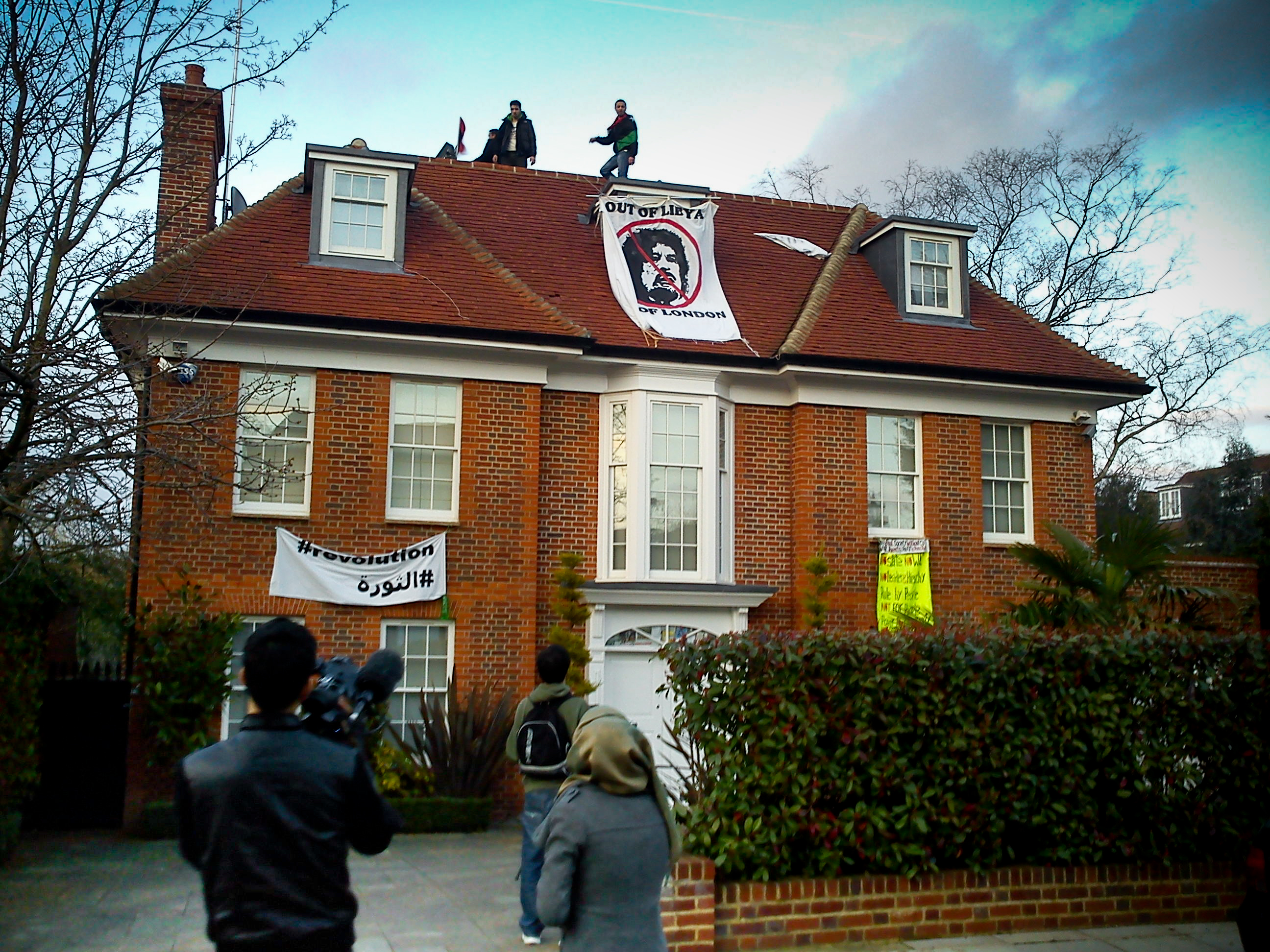
Saif al-Islam Gaddafi's house in London occupied by protesters calling themselves Topple the Tyrants

The following were also subjects of an asset freeze:

- Ayesha Gaddafi
- Hannibal Muammar Gaddafi
- Khamis Gaddafi
- Muammar Gaddafi
- Mutassim Gaddafi
- Saif al-Islam Gaddafi

== Infraction of the resolution ==
On 16 April 2011, one of the rebel leaders, General Abdul Fatah Younis told Al-Arabiya that his forces were receiving armament supplies from abroad. This information was confirmed by Mustafa Gheriani, a spokesman for the rebels' National Transitional Council. On 28 July, it became known that it was France that parachuted assault rifles, machineguns and anti-tank guided weapons for the first time, and was airlifting weapons to the airfields that had recently been constructed by rebels.

== See also ==
- Foreign relations of Libya
- List of United Nations Security Council Resolutions 1901 to 2000 (2009–2011)
- Responsibility to protect
- United Nations Security Council Resolution 1973
