= Safia Farkash =

First Lady of Libya from 1970 to 2011

- صفية فركاش
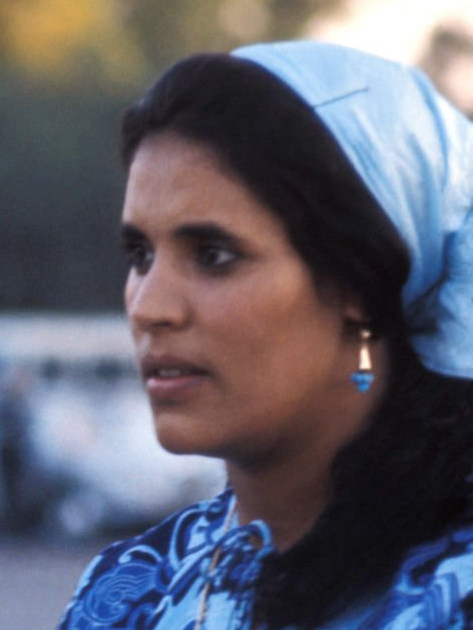
- Farkash in 1970

First Lady of Libya
- In role 10 September 1970 – 20 October 2011
- Leader: Muammar Gaddafi
- Preceded by: Fathia Nuri
- Succeeded by: No Data

First Lady of African Union
- In office 2 February 2009 – 31 January 2010
- President: Muammar Gaddafi
- Preceded by: Salma Kikwete
- Succeeded by: Callista Chimombo

Personal details
- Born: Safia Farkash Al-Barassi; 1952 (age 73–74) Bayda, Kingdom of Libya or Mostar, Yugoslavia
- Spouse: Muammar Gaddafi (m. 1970; died 2011)
- Children: 9 Sons (7): Saif al-Islam (deceased); Al-Saadi; Mutassim (deceased); Hannibal; Saif al-Arab (deceased); Khamis (deceased, disputed); Milad (adopted); Daughters (2): Aisha; Hana (adopted)
- Relatives: Abdullah Senussi (brother-in-law)
- Occupation: businesswoman, politician

Safia Farkash (Arabic: صفية فركاش; born 1952) is a Libyan businesswoman. As the widow of former Libyan leader Muammar Gaddafi, she is the former First Lady of Libya and Representative of Sirte, and the mother of seven of Gaddafi's eight biological children.

== Early life ==
There are two different stories about her origin. The commonly known one is that Farkash is from a family from the Eastern Libyan Barasa tribe and that she was born in Bayda and trained as a nurse. The non-mainstream story is that Farkash is from Mostar, Bosnia and Herzegovina, where she was born as Zsófia Farkas, or Sofija Farkaš, and is of Bosnian Croat or Hungarian origin. (Note: Farkas, meaning 'wolf' in Hungarian, is a common family name in Croatia and Hungary.)

== Personal life ==
Farkash met Gaddafi when he was hospitalized and treated for appendicitis in 1970. She became his second wife when they married in Tripoli the same year.

Farkash has seven biological children with Gaddafi and two adopted children:

- Saif al-Islam Gaddafi (25 June 1972 – 3 February 2026), her eldest son, was an architect who was long-rumored to be Gaddafi's successor. He has been a spokesman to the Western world, and he has negotiated treaties with Italy and the United States. He was viewed as politically moderate, and in 2006, after criticizing his father's government, he briefly left Libya. In 2007, Gaddafi exchanged angry letters with his son regarding his son's statements that Bulgarian nurses had been tortured. They later reconciled. On 3 February 2026, Saif al-Islam was shot and killed by four gunmen at his private garden in Zintan, who then fled the scene.
- Al-Saadi Gaddafi (born 25 May 1973), is a retired professional football player and former commander of Libya’s Special Forces. He attempted relocations to numerous countries following the Libyan Civil War but in 2014 he was extradited from Niger to Libya where he was charged with murder. Since his release in 2021, he is believed to live in Turkey.
- Mutassim Gaddafi (18 December 1974 – 20 October 2011), Gaddafi's fourth son, was a Lieutenant-colonel in the Libyan Army. He later served as Libya's National Security Advisor. He was seen as a possible successor to his father, after Saif al-Islam. Mutassim was killed along with his father after the battle of Sirte.
- Hannibal Muammar Gaddafi (born 20 September 1976), was an employee of the General National Maritime Transport Company, a company that specialized in oil exports. He is most known for his violent incidents in Europe, attacking police officers in Italy (2001), drunk driving (2004), and for assaulting his girlfriend in Paris (2005). In 2008, he was charged with assaulting two staff in Switzerland, and was imprisoned by Swiss police. The arrest created a strong standoff between Libya and Switzerland.
- Aisha Gaddafi (born 25 December 1977), Farkash's only biological daughter, is a lawyer who joined the defense teams of executed former Iraqi President Saddam Hussein and Iraqi journalist Muntadhar al-Zaidi. In 2006, she married a cousin of her father's, Ahmed al-Gaddafi al-Qahsi, with whom she has four children (as of 2011). Two of her children were killed by NATO airstrikes (one with her brother Saif al-Arab Gaddafi on 30 April 2011 and the other with her husband Ahmed al-Gaddafi al-Qahsi on 26 July 2011). She gave birth to her fourth child in Algeria on 30 August 2011, after the death of her husband and two children.
- Saif al-Arab Gaddafi (1982 – 30 April 2011) was appointed a military commander in the Libyan Army during the Libyan Civil War. Saif al-Arab and three of Farkash's grandchildren were reported killed by a NATO bombing in April 2011. Like the death of Hana, this is disputed by the organizations alleged to be responsible.
- Khamis Gaddafi (27 May 1983 – 29 August 2011), her sixth son, who was serving as the commander of the Libyan Army's elite Khamis Brigade. On 30 August 2011, a spokesman for the National Transitional Council said it was "almost certain" Khamis had been killed in Tarhuna during clashes with units of the National Liberation Army.

She and Gaddafi are rumored to have adopted two children, Hana and Milad.

- Hana Muammar Gaddafi (claimed by Gaddafi to be his adopted daughter, but most facts surrounding this claim are disputed) was apparently killed at the age of four, during the retaliatory US bombing raids in 1986. She may not have died; the adoption may have been posthumous; or he may have adopted a second daughter and given her the same name after the first one died. Following the taking by rebels of the family residence in the Bab al-Azizia compound in Tripoli, The New York Times both reported evidence (complete with photographs) of Hana's life after her declared death, when she became a doctor and worked in a Tripoli hospital. Her passport was reported as showing a birth date of 11 November 1985, making her six months old at the time of the US raid. However, a Libyan official told the Daily Telegraph that Gaddafi adopted a second daughter and named her Hana in honor of the first one who was killed.

The family's main residence was in the Bab al-Azizia military barracks, located in the southern suburbs of Tripoli.

== Business and other interests ==
Farkash kept a low profile during the initial period of her marriage to Gaddafi; however, after the release on license of Lockerbie bomber Abdul Baset Ali al-Megrahi in 2009, she took a more public profile. Farkash owns airline Buraq Air, headquartered at Mittiga International Airport.

== Libyan Civil War ==
Farkash stayed with her husband and family through the Libyan Civil War, at their home in Tripoli. After a first round of United Nations sanctions froze the overseas assets of Libya and those personally held by Gaddafi, the governments of France and the United Kingdom enabled a second round of sanctions, which froze an estimated £18 billions of state and personal assets controlled by Farkash. In May 2011, she gave her first press interview to CNN reporter Nima Elbagir, via mobile telephone.

As the Battle for Tripoli reached a climax in mid-August, the family were forced to abandon their fortified compound. On 27 August 2011, it was reported by the Egyptian news agency Mena that Libyan rebel fighters had seen six armored Mercedes-Benz sedans, possibly carrying top Gaddafi regime figures, cross the border at the south-western Libyan town of Ghadames towards Algeria, which at the time was denied by the Algerian authorities. On 29 August, the Algerian government officially announced that Safia together with daughter Aisha and sons Muhammad and Hannibal, had crossed into Algeria early on 29 August. An Algerian Foreign Ministry official said all the people in the convoy were now in Algiers. The family had arrived at a Sahara Desert entry point, in a Mercedes and a bus at 08:45 AM. The number of people in the party was unconfirmed, but there were "many children" and they did not include Gaddafi. Resultantly the group was allowed in on humanitarian grounds, and the Algerian government had since informed the head of the Libyan National Transitional Council, who had made no official request for their return.

In October 2012 they left a hideaway in Algeria to go to Oman, where they were granted political asylum. As of 2023, she was reported to reside in Cairo, Egypt.

== Sanctions ==
The Central Bank of the United Arab Emirates ordered in March 2012 all banks and financial institutions in the country to freeze the accounts of Safia Farkash and high-ranking officials of the Gaddafi regime. This order was declared in accordance with the UN Security Council's Resolution No. 1970 of 2011, addressing fifteen Libyans whose bank accounts had been frozen for their involvement in violence against the people of Libya. In April 2016, she was allowed to return to Libya by the government as part of their efforts to pacify Gaddafi loyalists.
