= Ahmed al-Gaddafi al-Qahsi =

Libyan colonel (1970–2011)

Personal details
- Born: 15 July 1970 Tripoli, Libya
- Died: 26 July 2011 (aged 41) Sirte, Libya
- Spouse: Ayesha Gaddafi (m. 2006)
- Children: 4

Military service
- Allegiance: (Libya) Libyan Arab Jamahiriya
- Branch/service: Libyan Army
- Rank: Colonel

Ahmed al-Gaddafi al-Qahsi (Arabic: أحمد القذافي; 15 July 1970 – 26 July 2011) was a cousin of former Libyan leader Muammar Gaddafi. On 16 April 2006, he married Gaddafi's daughter Ayesha. According to the Gaddafi family, Qahsi, who was a colonel in the Libyan Army, was killed by a French airstrike on the Gaddafi compound on 26 July 2011 during the Libyan Civil War. The couple had three children before the conflict started, one of whom was killed along with one of Ayesha's brothers in a NATO airstrike and another killed along with her husband in the bombing of Gaddafi's compound. Their fourth child, a girl, was born in Algeria as Ayesha fled there with her brothers Hannibal and Muhammad after the Battle of Tripoli in 2011.
