= Hana Gaddafi =

Daughter of former Libyan leader Muammar Gaddafi (1985-possibly 1986)

- Born: Hana Muammar Gaddafi; November 11, 1985 (age 40)
- Known for: Alleged adopted daughter of Muammar Gaddafi

Hana Muammar Gaddafi was the adopted daughter of Muammar Gaddafi. She was said to have been killed during the U.S. bombing raids in 1986.

Doubts have been cast on many aspects of that account: Hana may not have died; the adoption may have been posthumous; or Gaddafi may have adopted a second daughter and given her the same name after the first one died. Following the taking by rebels of the family residence in the Bab al-Azizia compound in Tripoli, The New York Times reported evidence (complete with photographs) of Hana's life after her declared death, when she became a doctor and worked in a Tripoli hospital. Her passport was reported as showing a birth date of 11 November 1985, making her six months old at the time of the US raid. In August 2011, the Daily Telegraph reported on the finding of dental records relating to a Hana Gaddafi by NLC staff taking over the London embassy. This report, which also cites a 1999 spotting by Chinese officials, cites an unnamed Libyan government spokesman as stating that Gaddafi had adopted a second daughter, and named her Hana in honor of the first one who had been killed in the 1986 raid. This theory of a second adopted daughter with the same name after the death of the first adopted daughter in 1986 is also supported by the Federal Intelligence Service in Germany in 2011.

In September 2011, the claim that Hana had been killed in the 1986 bombing was further disputed when a video recorded in 1989 by Gaddafi's cameraman Mohammad Ali was obtained by The Daily Telegraph. In the video, Muammar and other members of the Gaddafi family refer to her by her name while playing football at a campsite. Hana is rumored to have fled to Algeria with her mother and three siblings Mohammed, Hannibal and Aisha.

== See also ==
- List of people who disappeared
