= Misrata War Museum =

- متحف مصراتة الحربي
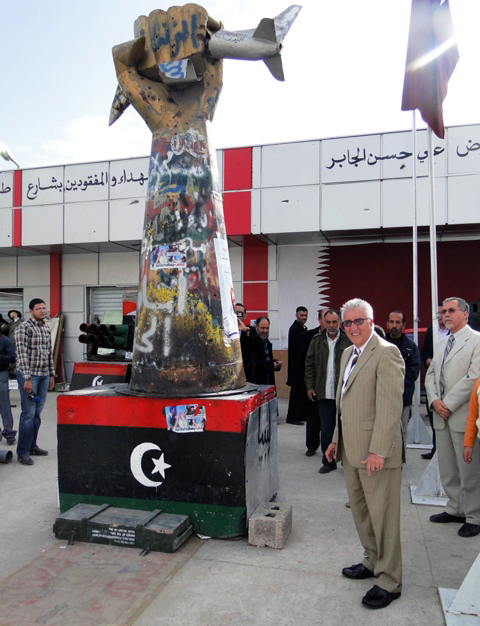
- The Fist Crushing a U.S. Fighter Plane monument, which is now on display at the Misrata War Museum.
- Established: 2011
- Location: Misrata, Misrata District, Libya
- Type: War museum
- Owner: Government of Libya

The Misrata War Museum (Arabic: متحف مصراتة الحربي) contains a collection of weapons, photos and objects linked to the Libyan War of 2011. It is located in the Libyan city of Misrata.

== History ==
Misrata was one of the cities most repressed by the regime of Muammar Gaddafi during the Libyan War of 2011. For that reason, when the conflict ended in the country and the Libyan leader was defeated, it was decided to build a museum to show the weapons used during the war and so that people would not "forget" what happened. It was the first of this kind built in Libya.

It was decided to install on Tripoli Street, where the most intense fighting between the Gaddafi loyalist forces and the rebels was recorded, and it was dedicated to the memory of Murad Ali Hasan Yaber, an Al Jazeera cameraman who died in Benghazi while reporting on the rebellion. Initially, the museum was managed by volunteer activists without any professional guiding the work. Despite this, it managed to attract an average of 1,500 visits per week in the first months.

== Collection ==
The articles exhibited in the museum are mostly symbols of the regime that were brought from the bastions of Gaddafi ( Tripoli and Sirte ) to Misrata by the more than 200 brigades of militiamen of the city. Among the exhibited pieces are:

- Fist Crushing a U.S. Fighter Plane: anti-American monument built by order of Gaddafi and originally located at his residence in Bab al-Azizia, (Tripoli).
- Gaddafi's chair: it was used by the Libyan leader during his stay in Sirte and, after his death, the rebels used it to transport the corpse to Misrata.
- Statue of an eagle: brought from the barracks of the Salahaldin brigades (Tripoli).
- Photos of more than a thousand dead and missing during the government of Gaddafi.
- Weapons and ammunition used during the war: AK-47 bullets and a half-ton bomb, as well as several rockets, mortars, projectiles, Russian-made tanks and homemade bulletproof vests.
- Personal effects of Gaddafi: two copies of the Koran belonging to the Libyan leader, a set of tableware and several bottles of alcoholic beverages (which supposedly demonstrate his alcoholism, something forbidden by Islam ).
- The leader's own body was publicly exposed for 5 days.
- In 2013, a group of volunteers from the NGO Mines Advisory Group helped the museum dispose of more than 363 explosive devices that put visitors' safety at risk.
