= Fist Crushing a U.S. Fighter Plane =

1986 monument in Libya

Fist Crushing a U.S. Fighter Plane Sculpture
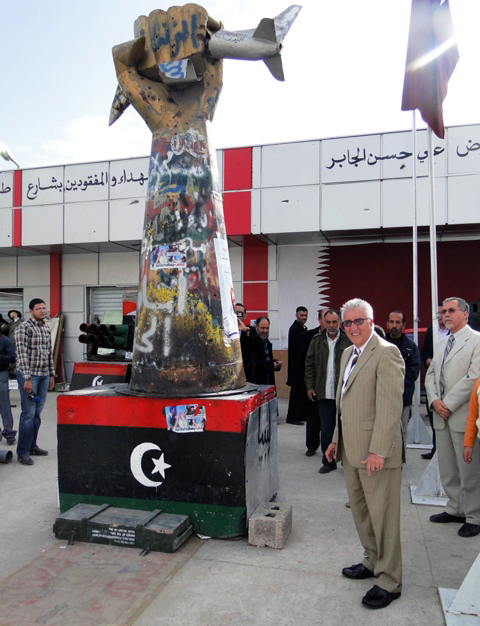
- Location: Libya; 32°22′52″N 15°05′09″E

The Fist Crushing a U.S. Fighter Plane Sculpture is a gold-coloured monument located in Misrata, Libya. It was once located at the Bab al-Azizia compound in the Libyan capital of Tripoli. The sculpture was commissioned by the nation's leader, Colonel Muammar Gaddafi following the 1986 bombing of Libya by United States aircraft. It was built in the shape of an arm and hand squeezing a fighter plane. It may have been designed to symbolize the apparent downing of an F-111 by Libyan anti-air units in 1986 bombing.

== Libyan civil war ==
During the 2011 Libyan civil war, the sculpture was frequently noted in media coverage of televised speeches given by Gaddafi on 22 February and 20 March 2011, in which he vowed to "die a martyr" to prevent anti-government rebels prevailing.

On 23 August, at the height of the Battle of Tripoli, NTC rebels breached the Bab al-Azizia compound and international news stations broadcast pictures of rebels gathered around the statue, with one fighter having climbed onto it. Graffiti had been drawn on its base by rebel forces. At some point in time, the U.S. flag and initials U.S.A. had been removed from the representation of the plane.

== Current display ==
The sculpture is now on display at the Misrata War Museum.

== See also ==
- Iconoclasm
- Saddam Hussein statue
