= Reda Al Tawarghi =

Libyan footballer (born 1979)

Personal information
- Full name: Reda Milad Al Tawarghi
- Date of birth: May 29, 1979 (age 47)
- Place of birth: Tripoli, Libya
- Position: Defender

Team information
- Current team: Al Tersana
- Number: 25

Youth career
- Al Ahly Tripoli

Senior career*
Years	Team	Apps	(Gls)
2001–03	Al Ahly Tripoli	?	(?)
2003–2007	Al-Ittihad	?	(?)
2007–2008	Al Olympic	?	(?)
2008–present	Al Tersana	?	(?)

International career
- Libya
- * Club domestic league appearances and goals as of January 27, 2007

Reda Milad Al Tawarghi (born May 29, 1979) is a Libyan football defender. He currently plays for Al Tersana and is a member of the Libya national football team.

He was a close friend of Saadi Gaddafi, a teammate at Al Ahly Tripoli from 2001 to 2003 and the son of then Libyan leader Muammar Gaddafi. After the Battle of Tripoli in August 2011, Tawarghi alleged he was thrown in jail for two and a half years for rejecting Saadi's homosexual advances.
