= Al-Saadi Gaddafi =

Libyan footballer and son of Muammar Gaddafi (born 1973)

Personal information
- Full name: Al-Saadi Muammar Gaddafi
- Date of birth: 25 May 1973 (age 53)
- Place of birth: Tripoli, Libya
- Height: 1.84 m (6 ft 0 in)
- Position: Forward

Senior career*
Years	Team	Apps	(Gls)
1997–2001	Al-Ahly Tripoli	14+	(3+)
2001–2003	Al-Ittihad Tripoli	74	(24)
2003–2004	Perugia	1	(0)
2005–2006	Udinese	1	(0)
2006–2007	Sampdoria	0	(0)
Total		90	(27)

International career
2001–2003	Libya	3	(0)
- * Club domestic league appearances and goals

Al-Saadi Muammar Gaddafi, also spelt as Al-Saadi Moammer Al-Gaddafi (Arabic: الساعدي معمر القذافي; born 25 May 1973), is a Libyan retired professional football player. He captained the national team, but his career was widely attributed to the influence of his father Muammar Gaddafi, the country's leader at the time.

In 2011, Gaddafi was the commander of Libya's Special Forces and participated in the Libyan Civil War. An Interpol notice was issued against him in 2011. In March 2014, he was arrested in Niger and extradited to Libya, where he faced murder charges, which he was cleared of in 2018. In August 2015, a video surfaced allegedly showing him being tortured.

He was a central figure in the SNC-Lavalin scandal in Canada. In 2019, SNC-Lavalin, Canada's biggest engineering firm, pled guilty to paying Saadi $28 million in bribes to secure construction contracts in Libya. SNC-Lavalin also allegedly paid over $2 million for Saadi's 2008 visit to Canada, including bodyguards, companion services, $10,000 to an escort service in Vancouver, a strip club in Montreal, and box seats for a Spice Girls concert at the Air Canada Centre in Toronto.

He was released in September 2021 and left for Turkey.

== Football career ==
=== Club career ===
Gaddafi is known for his participation in Libyan football, which was arranged in his favor. One law forbade announcing the name of any player with the exception of Gaddafi. Only numbers of other players were announced. Referees favored Gaddafi's club and security forces were used to silence protests.

He played for Al-Ahly Tripoli between 1997 and 2000, and Al-Ittihad Tripoli between 2001 and 2003.

On 6 June 2000, the BBC reported that Gaddafi had signed with Maltese champions Bikirkara and would play for them in the Champions League. The move failed to materialize. In 2003, he signed for Serie A team Perugia, employing Diego Maradona as his technical consultant and Canadian sprinter Ben Johnson as his personal trainer.

He made only one substitute appearance for Perugia against Juventus, before failing a drug test, due to presence in his system of the illegal substance Nandrolone. An article in la Repubblica said that "Even at twice his current speed he would still be twice as slow as slow itself."

Gaddafi joined UEFA Champions League qualifiers Udinese in 2005–06, playing only 10 minutes in an end-of-season league match against Cagliari. He joined Sampdoria during the 2006–07 season, without playing a single match.

=== International career ===
He was captain of the Libya national team, captain of his home club in Tripoli, and president of the Libyan Football Federation. He debuted for Libya on 28 January 2001 during the 3–1 loss against Angola in 2002 FIFA World Cup qualification, and he only played two more matches for Libya.

== Business activities ==
In 2006, Al-Saadi Gaddafi and the Jamahiriya government launched a project to create a semi-autonomous city similar to Hong Kong in Libya, stretching 40 km between Tripoli and the Tunisian border. The proposed new city would become a high tech, banking, medical and educational center not requiring visas to enter. The city would have its own international airport and a major seaport. Gaddafi promised religious tolerance with both "synagogues and churches" and no discrimination in this new metropolis. The new city would have "Western-style" business laws that Saadi thought European and American companies would find welcoming and familiar.

Gaddafi used to take great interest in the affairs of many of Libya's other business interests like Tamoil, the oil refining and marketing company owned by the Libyan government, before the overthrow of the regime.

=== Italian lawsuit ===
In July 2010, Gaddafi was ordered by an Italian court to pay €392,000 to a luxurious Ligurian hotel for an unpaid bill dating back to a month-long stay in the summer of 2007.

== Personal life ==
Gaddafi is married to the daughter of al-Khweildi al-Hmeidi, a Libyan military commander who was involved in the 1969 Libyan coup d'état that brought Gaddafi to power.

In 2009, a U.S. diplomatic cable called Gaddafi "the black sheep" of Muammar Gaddafi's family. It mentioned scuffles with European police, "abuse of drugs and alcohol, excessive partying" and "profligate affairs with women and men". Gaddafi's bisexuality had partly prompted the arrangement of his marriage to the commander's daughter, the cable said. Saadi was having a relationship with Bulgarian national Dafinka Mircheva. After the Battle of Tripoli in 2011, Saadi's former teammate at Al Ahly Tripoli and close friend, Reda Al Tawarghi, alleged that Saadi had jailed him for 2 1/2 years for rejecting his "homosexual advances".

== 2011 to present ==
=== Libyan civil war ===
On 27 February 2011, Saadi was interviewed by Christiane Amanpour on ABC News, where he warned of imminent civil war and that if his father left Libya, the power vacuum would only lead to more chaos. He also stated that he was looking for a lawyer to fight the travel ban against him levied by UN Security Council Resolution 1970.

On 15 March 2011, there were unconfirmed reports that a pilot by the name of Muhammad Mokhtar Osman had flown his jet into the Gaddafi stronghold of Bab al-Azizia in Tripoli damaging it and injuring him and his brother Khamis.

Speaking to BBC Panorama, a former Jamahiriya soldier claimed that Gaddafi had personally ordered to shoot unarmed protesters in Benghazi when visiting the city's army barracks at the beginning of the uprising. Gaddafi confirmed that he had been at the barracks but denied giving orders to fire on protesters.

Gaddafi was reportedly the driving force behind a change in fighting tactics of the government's forces. Instead of using heavy infantry, tanks and armored cars – which could easily be distinguished from the Free Libyan Army and then destroyed by allied fighter jets – the fight against the rebels was pursued with small, fast and versatile units.

The rebels claimed that they captured him during the Battle of Tripoli, on 21 August, but later the claim turned out to be false.

On 24 August, Gaddafi contacted CNN, stating that he had the authority to negotiate on behalf of loyalist forces, and wished to discuss a ceasefire with U.S. and NATO authorities. A week later he contacted Al Arabiya, stating his father was ready to step down, and called for dialogue with the National Transitional Council.

On 5 September, Gaddafi said in an interview with CNN that an "aggressive" speech by his brother Saif al-Islam had led to the breakdown of talks between NTC forces and Gaddafi loyalists in Bani Walid, and said he had not seen his father in two months. Gaddafi also claimed a position of neutrality in the conflict and offered to mediate.

=== Flight to Niger ===
On 11 September 2011, Gaddafi fled to Niger with the help of his Australian bodyguard, Gary Peters, and was allowed entrance on humanitarian grounds. According to the government of Niger, they planned to detain Gaddafi while determining what to do with him. Peters had also been trying to assemble a team to smuggle Saadi to Barbados or Venezuela.

On 29 September 2011, an Interpol red notice was issued for Gaddafi. Brigi Rafini, the Prime minister of Niger said he would not allow Gaddafi to be extradited.

On 11 November 2011, Niger's President Mahamadou Issoufou said his government had decided to grant Gaddafi asylum "on humanitarian grounds".

On 7 December 2011, the Mexican Interior Secretary said that Mexican intelligence agents broke up a smuggling ring attempting to bring Gaddafi into Mexico under a false name.

On 10 February 2012, Saadi called into Al-Arabiya television by phone, where he claimed that he was in contact with Libyan tribes, militias, the NTC, the national army, and other members of the Gaddafi family from his hideout in Niger. He also claimed that a large-scale Gaddafi loyalist uprising was imminent, that the NTC was not legitimate, and that he was ready to return to Libya "at any minute."

On 3 July 2012, the Washington Post reported that Saadi and his entourage had been dining out regularly at upscale restaurants and frequenting nightclubs in Niamey despite Niger's government claim that he was under house arrest. It was also reported that the state guesthouse he was allegedly under house arrest in was in fact "a luxurious, high-walled mansion in one of the city's most affluent neighborhoods, near the U.S. and French embassies."

=== Extradition and torture allegations ===
On 5 March 2014, Libya announced that Gaddafi had been extradited by Niger and was in Tripoli. His lawyer, Nick Kaufman, protested about the move stating "extradition suggests that this was a legal process where Saadi Gadhafi was accorded a lawyer, a court hearing, and…it's not even clear to me that that even took place". Later that month, Gaddafi gave an apology to the Libyan people from a Tripoli prison which was broadcast on Libyan state TV. He apologized for "all the harm I've caused and for disturbing the security and stability of Libya" and called for "those who carry weapons to hand over their weapons". He said he was being treated well in prison.

In May 2015, Gaddafi appeared in a Tripoli court and was formally charged with unlawful imprisonment and murder for the 2005 killing of football player and coach Bashir al-Riani.

In early August 2015, a video surfaced that appeared to show a blindfolded Gaddafi being forced to listen to other men allegedly being tortured in the next room. Then the guards beat the man appearing to be Gaddafi on the feet as he screams, after asking him if preferred to be beaten on the feet or on his buttocks. "It does appear to be Saadi Gaddafi," one of his lawyers, Melinda Taylor, told RT. "He looks the same in [the] sense [that] his head ... [had been] shaved which happened to him last year." No legal team appears to be present.

International human rights groups and activists condemned the video, which appeared to have been recorded at al-Hadba prison in Tripoli, and was first released by Arabic network Clear News.

"This is a shocking video that raises questions about conditions inside the prison," said Karim Khan, a British attorney who represents Libya's former Prime minister Baghdadi Mahmudi, who is also at al-Hadba. "The international community needs to demand a full investigation."

In June 2017, Haitham Tajouri's Tripoli Revolutionaries' Brigade seized al-Hadba prison and relocated senior Gaddafi regime figures, including Saadi, to the Radisson Blu Al Mahary Hotel Tripoli. While under interrogation by Tajouri's militia, Saadi claimed that Mohammed bin Zayed, the de facto ruler of the UAE, was working on a plan to bring Saif al-Islam Gaddafi to power in order to "calm the situation down" in Libya.

An appeals court on 3 April 2018 cleared Saadi from the charge of murdering the footballer Bashir. He was however fined 500 Libyan dinars and a suspended one-year prison term for drinking and possessing alcohol.

=== Release and alleged exile to Turkey ===
As of 5 September 2021, he has been released from custody from al-Hadaba prison and left for Turkey, but Turkey's foreign ministry claimed it had "no knowledge" of Saadi's presence in Istanbul. On 10 September 2021, Moussa Ibrahim confirmed that Saadi was in Turkey and that Egypt and Saudi Arabia had also offered to host Saadi. It was claimed that Saadi's captors denied him the appropriate medical care.

As of 2023, he was reported to reside in the Turkish city of Istanbul.

== Career statistics ==
=== International ===
Appearances and goals by national team and year
National team	Year	Apps	Goals
Libya	2001	2	0
Libya	2002	0	0
Libya	2003	1	0
Total		3	0

== See also ==
- List of sportspeople sanctioned for doping offences
- SNC-Lavalin scandal
