= Saif al-Arab Gaddafi =

Son of Libyan leader Muammar Gaddafi (1982–2011)

- سيف العرب القذافي
- Born: 7 August 1981; Tripoli, Libyan Arab Jamahiriya
- Died: 30 April 2011; Tripoli, Libya
- Resting place: Al-Hani Cemetery, Tripoli, Libya
- Parent(s): Muammar Gaddafi (father); Safia Farkash (mother)

Saif al-Arab Gaddafi (Arabic: سيف العرب القذافي, romanized: Saifu l-ʿArab al-Qaḏḏāfī, lit. 'Sword of the Arabs; of the Gaddafa'; 7 August 1981 – 30 April 2011) was the sixth son of the then Libyan leader Muammar Gaddafi. From around 2006 to 2010, Saif al-Arab spent much of his time in Munich. On 30 April 2011, the Libyan government reported that Saif al-Arab and three of his young nieces and nephews were killed by a NATO airstrike, which was later revealed to be French, on his house during the Libyan Civil War. During the beginning of the uprising, Saif al-Arab was put in charge of military forces by his father in order to put down protests in Benghazi. Saif al-Arab was viewed as the most low-profile of Gaddafi's eight children.

== Early life ==
Saif al-Arab was born in the Libyan capital of Tripoli to Muammar Gaddafi and his second wife Safia Farkash.

Saif al-Arab was wounded in the 1986 U.S. bombing of Libya when he was four years old.

== Life in Munich ==
In 2006, Saif al-Arab came to Munich with an Italian tourist visa for a proposed study. In November that year, Saif al-Arab became involved in a fight with a nightclub bouncer, after his girlfriend was thrown out of Munich's "4004" nightclub for performing a strip show for Saif al-Arab. In the resulting scuffle Saif al-Arab received a cut to his head. Although Saif al-Arab was charged, the Munich public prosecutor dropped charges on the basis that a prosecution would not be in the public interest. German police later received reports that Saif al-Arab was planning an acid attack against the bouncer and the Libyan embassy in Germany unsuccessfully attempted to secure diplomatic immunity for Saif al-Arab. By March 2007, Saif al-Arab's location was not known, and it was thought that he was not in Germany.

In 2008, Saif al-Arab again stayed in Munich. Excessive noise from the exhaust of his Ferrari F430 led to questions from the German police and his car being impounded. Also that year Saif al-Arab was suspected of attempting to smuggle an assault rifle, a revolver and munitions from Munich to Paris in a car with diplomatic number plates. However, the case was later dropped as the alleged weapons were never found and the German public prosecutor decided that there was insufficient evidence to proceed with a prosecution. The Guardian newspaper reported that German police officers had stated that the case was dropped out of fear that German businesses and residents in Libya would suffer retaliatory action, although this was denied by the German prosecutor's office. In addition to his studies, Al Jazeera reported Saif al-Arab engaged in unspecified business activities and spent much of his time partying while in Munich. Notwithstanding these media reports, Saif al-Arab was viewed as the most low-profile of Gaddafi's sons.

== Actions during the Libyan civil war ==
In February 2011, following the outbreak of the Libyan Civil War, the German press reported that Saif al-Arab had returned to Libya. Subsequently, the Bavarian Interior Ministry stated that he had been declared persona non-grata.

On 26 February 2011, the United Nations Security Council issued Resolution 1970 which imposed a travel ban on Saif al-Arab but stopped short of imposing asset freezing as it did with many other members of the Gaddafi family. An Interpol notice (orange notice) was then issued against him.

== Death ==
On 30 April 2011, a Libyan government spokesman, Moussa Ibrahim, announced an air strike on Saif al-Arab's house had killed Saif al-Arab, along with three of Muammar Gaddafi's grandchildren. Moussa Ibrahim refused to release the names of the grandchildren killed for "privacy reasons". The government also claimed Muammar Gaddafi was present in the house during the attack, but "escaped". The next day Libyan state TV showed footage of two bodies in a hospital fully covered and veiled, and thus unidentifiable, but claimed that one of them was Saif al-Arab Gaddafi's corpse.

NATO said it struck a command-and-control center, not a residential structure and that it was not targeting individuals. The British Foreign and Commonwealth Office says it is unable to verify if Saif al-Arab or his relatives were killed.

Members of the opposition centered in Benghazi have speculated that the Libyan government's claim of Saif al-Arab's death was a tactic to gain sympathy. Abdul Hafez Goga, spokesman for the National Transitional Council, said he thinks it could all be fabrication: "Back in 1986, Gaddafi once claimed that Ronald Reagan, then US president, had launched a strike on his compound in Tripoli and killed his daughter. Many journalists since then investigated and found out that the actual child that had died had nothing to do with Gaddafi, that he sort of adopted her posthumously."

NATO claimed that it has no evidence of his death and could neither confirm nor deny Libyan claims. They further said what the Libyan government has called a "residence" actually held an underground bunker which is used as a command-and-control center and that was the target.

The French surgeon Gérard Le Clouerec who worked at a private clinic in Libya was asked by the Libyan authorities to provide independent verification of the identity of the bodies of one adult and two children. While Le Clouerec was confident that all three had been killed as a result of blast injuries, due to the severity of the injuries he could not identify the bodies of the children. He was able to confirm that the adult corpse was the body of a man aged about 30, with a thin moustache and beard. Le Clouerec was shown a photograph, which he was told depicted Saif al-Arab. The face of the man's body matched that of the photograph and Le Clouerec concluded that the body was "most probably the son of Colonel Gaddafi." The highest-ranking Roman Catholic official in Tripoli, Apostolic Vicar Giovanni Innocenzo Martinelli, also confirmed the death of Saif al-Arab; his body was reported to be shown to the leaders of churches in Libya. It was later reported to be a French airstrike.

On 25 May, Silvio Berlusconi, the Italian Prime minister, dismissed claims of Saif al-Arab's death as propaganda. He said that according to intelligence services, Saif al-Arab was not dead but was living in another unspecified country.

In August, with the pro-Gaddafi forces on the brink of losing Tripoli, Saif al-Arab's brother Mutassim spoke of envying Saif al-Arab as according to Mutassim, his brother had been "martyred" in a NATO airstrike. Mutassim had been speaking privately to his former girlfriend, Talitha van Zon.

== Funeral ==
External image
- Reuters – Libyans attend the funeral of Saif Al-Arab Gaddafi

About 2,000 of Muammar Gaddafi's supporters attended the funeral of the Libyan leader's son Saif al-Arab, his second youngest, in Tripoli on 2 May 2011, as the regime intensified its attack on the besieged city of Misrata. The elder Gaddafi himself did not attend the funeral, however, two of his other sons, Saif al-Islam Gaddafi, who was seen as his father's intended successor, and Hannibal were both observed in the crowd.

Saif al-Arab's body, covered in a cloth of pro-Gaddafi green, was brought to the Al-Hani Cemetery in a black ambulance.

Three of Muammar Gaddafi's grandchildren, identified by the authorities as being a child each of Hannibal, Muhammad and their sister Aisha, were also buried.
