= Aisha Gaddafi =

Daughter of former Libyan leader Muammar Gaddafi (born 1977)

- عائشة القذافي

Personal details
- Born: December 24, 1977 (age 48) Tripoli, Libya
- Spouse: Ahmed al-Gaddafi al-Qahsi (m. 2006; died 2011)
- Children: 4
- Parents: Muammar Gaddafi; Safia Farkash
- Website: aishaalgaddafi-art.com

Military service
- Allegiance: Great Socialist People's Libyan Arab Jamahiriya
- Branch/service: Libyan Army
- Rank: Lieutenant colonel

Aisha Gaddafi (Arabic: عائشة القذافي, romanized: ʿĀʾiša al-Qaḏḏāfī; born December 24, 1977), also known as Ayesha Gaddafi, is a Libyan former mediator and military official, former UN Goodwill ambassador, and lawyer by profession.

She is the fifth child and only biological daughter of former Libyan leader Muammar Gaddafi from his second wife Safia Farkash.

== Education ==
Gaddafi was educated at the Paris Diderot University, and studied law at the University of Paris 1 Pantheon-Sorbonne.

== Military service ==
She trained with the Libyan military, reaching the rank of Lieutenant-colonel.

== Diplomacy ==
In 2000, after sanctions were imposed on Iraq, she arrived in Baghdad with a delegation of 69 officials. Shortly before the 2003 invasion of Iraq, she met with Saddam Hussein.

In 2000, Aisha gave a speech at Speakers' Corner in Hyde Park, London in support of the Provisional Irish Republican Army. When questioned about her support for the IRA in 2010, she stated "I have always been a supporter of all liberation movements. Britain is Britain and Ireland is Ireland." She also supported the Iraqi insurgents, stating "When you have an occupying army coming from abroad, raping your women and killing your own people, it is only legitimate that you fight them."

In 2011, she strongly denounced the policies of U.S. Secretary of State Hillary Clinton and U.S. President Barack Obama, calling for a mediation of the Libyan Civil War through an international organization which would exclude them.

Aisha has served as a mediator on behalf of the government with European Union corporations.

=== UN Goodwill Ambassador ===
Aisha Gaddafi was appointed as the United Nations Development Program National Goodwill Ambassador for Libya on 24 July 2009, primarily to address the issues of HIV/AIDS, poverty and women's rights in Libya, all of which are culturally sensitive topics in the country.

In February 2011 the United Nations stripped Aisha of her role as a Goodwill ambassador.

== Legal affairs ==
In July 2004, she joined the legal defense team of former Iraqi President Saddam Hussein during his trial.

Gaddafi is also the head of the charity Wa Attassimou, which defended Muntadhar al-Zaidi when he faced charges stemming from the shoe-hurling incident.

== Libyan civil war ==
=== Travel ban ===
She was placed under a travel ban under United Nations Security Council Resolution 1970 from 26 February 2011 to 16 October 2023.

=== Legal petitions ===
Gaddafi sued NATO over the bombing of a building in her father's compound which she alleged killed her brother, Saif al-Arab Gaddafi, and her own infant daughter. She claimed that the attack was illegal because it targeted civilian buildings. Gaddafi's lawyers filed the petitions in Brussels and Paris in June 2011. However, on 27 July 2011, it was reported that Belgian prosecutors had declined to investigate the war crimes complaint filed by Gaddafi against NATO, stating that the courts of Belgium lacked jurisdiction to deal with the matter.

On 3 June 2012, through her lawyer Nick Kaufman, Aisha Gaddafi also petitioned the judges of the International Criminal Court requesting that they order the prosecutor - Fatou Bensouda to disclose what steps she had taken to investigate the murder of her father and brother Mutassim Gaddafi. This application was opposed by the prosecutor who stated that requiring her to disclose the requested information would intrude on prosecutorial independence and discretion and potentially impede the investigation itself.

=== Battle of Tripoli ===
As the Battle for Tripoli reached a climax in mid-August, the Gaddafi family were forced to abandon their fortified compound. On 22 August, Libyan rebels captured her house in the Battle of Tripoli. Among her possessions was a golden sofa shaped like a mermaid with the face of Aisha, designed by an Egyptian artist. Aisha's property was reportedly looted by the rebels.

=== Flight to Algeria ===
On 27 August 2011, it was reported by the Egyptian news agency Mena that Libyan rebel fighters had seen six armored Mercedes-Benz sedans, possibly carrying top Gaddafi regime figures, cross the border at the south-western Libyan town of Ghadames towards Algeria, which at the time was denied by the Algerian authorities. On 29 August, the Algerian government officially announced that Safia Farkash together with Aisha and her brothers Muhammad and Hannibal (along with his wife Aline Skaf), had crossed into Algeria early on 29 August. An Algerian Foreign Ministry official said all the people in the convoy were now in Algiers, and that all of them had been named in warrants issued by the International Criminal Court for possible war crimes charges. Mourad Benmehidi, the Algerian permanent representative to the United Nations, later confirmed the details of the statement. The family had arrived at a Sahara desert entry point, in a Mercedes and a bus at 8:45 a.m. local time. The exact number of people in the party was unconfirmed, but there were “many children” and they did not include Colonel Gaddafi. The group was allowed in on humanitarian grounds, because Aisha was pregnant and near her term. The Algerian government had since informed the head of the National Transitional Council. Libya's rebels said sheltering Gaddafi family members was an act of aggression, and called for their extradition.

On 30 August 2011 it was announced that Aisha had given birth to a girl in the city of Djanet.

They were reportedly being confined by the Algerian government to a villa in Staoueli near Algiers, and were being cut off from outside communications.

=== Life in exile ===
In October 2012 she, along with two of her brothers and other family members, left Algeria to go to Oman, where they were granted political asylum. She had been expelled for repeatedly setting fire to her safe house in Algeria. Ennahar newspaper reported that "she had blamed Algeria for her many problems." The last straw was when she burned a portrait of the country's president Abdelaziz Bouteflika.

The EU amended their sanctions list in 2014, but did not include Aisha, and rejected her requests to be removed from the list. She then sued on the basis that after the death of her father, there was now no reason for any bans. In May 2016, her mother and some of her family were allowed to return to Libya, but they were refused entry and returned to Oman as asylum seekers. But Aisha Gaddafi remained in Oman. In January 2017, European Union's General Court announced that her appeal had been successful, and that all sanctions and travel bans had been withdrawn. The court directed that EU governments pay court costs. As of March 2017, she reportedly was no longer in Oman and was living in Amman, Jordan. However, as of 2023, she was still reported to reside in the Sultanate of Oman.

In April 2021, the EU court ruled that Aisha Gaddafi should be removed from the European Union blacklist. According to the court, she no longer represented a threat to peace and security in the region.

On 17 October 2024, the State Museum of Oriental Art in Moscow opened a six-week exhibit of dozens of Aisha Gaddafi's artworks, including a painting of a crowd hovering over the corpses of her father and her brother who was killed alongside him. The painting shows members of the crowd using smartphones to snap pictures of the bodies. Aisha Gaddafi attended the exhibition of her artworks in Moscow, Russia.

== Personal life ==
Aisha was dubbed in the Arab press as the "Claudia Schiffer of North Africa," because of her dyed hair. On 16 April 2006, she married Ahmed al-Gaddafi al-Qahsi, a grandson of her father's uncle and an army colonel. Her husband was killed in the 26 July bombing of Gaddafi's compound. They had three children prior to the fall of the regime, one of whom was killed along with one of her brothers in a NATO airstrike and another killed along with her husband in the bombing of Gaddafi's compound. Algerian authorities confirmed that she gave birth to her fourth child in the hospital of Djanet, a baby girl, on 30 August 2011, who was named Safia-Djanet after her grandmother and the city she was born in, shortly after arriving there after fleeing Libya with other members of the Gaddafi family. Shortly after arriving in Algeria, they moved to Oman.

While living in Oman, she has done two art exhibits there. On 18 October 2024, the State Museum of Oriental Art exhibited her artwork for six weeks in Moscow. The exhibition included a painting depicting a crowd taking photos of her dead father and brother with smartphones.
