= Mutassim Gaddafi =

Libyan military officer and National Security Advisor of Libya (1974–2011)

- المعتصم القذافي
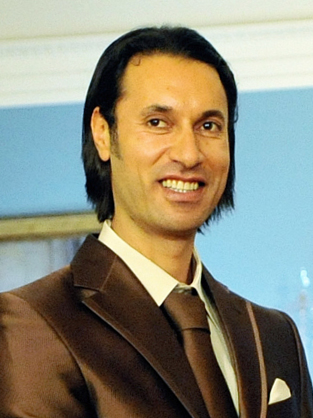
- Mutassim Gaddafi in April 2009

National Security Advisor of Libya
- In office 2008–2011
- Preceded by: Position established
- Succeeded by: Position abolished

Personal details
- Born: 5 December 1974 Tripoli, Libyan Arab Republic
- Died: 20 October 2011 (aged 36) Sirte, Libyan Arab Jamahiriya (now Libya)
- Cause of death: Gunshot wounds
- Resting place: In an unknown location in the Libyan Desert
- Domestic partner: Vanessa Hessler (2007–2011)
- Parents: Muammar Gaddafi; Safia Farkash

Military service
- Allegiance: (Libya) Libyan Arab Jamahiriya
- Branch/service: (Libya) Libyan Army
- Years of service: 1990s–2011
- Rank: Lieutenant Colonel
- Commands: Brega
- Battles/wars: First Libyan Civil War; Battle of Sirte X

Mutassim Billah Gaddafi (Arabic: المُعْتَصِمٌ بِٱللهِ ٱلْقَذَّافِيّ, romanized: Muʿtaṣim bi-llāh al-Qaḏḏāfī, also transliterated as Al-Moa'tassem Bellah Al-Qaddafi or Al-Mu'tasim Bi'llah al-Qadhafi; 5 December 1974 – 20 October 2011) was a Libyan military officer, and the National Security Advisor of Libya from 2008 until his assassination in 2011. He was the fourth son of former Libyan leader Muammar Gaddafi, and a member of his father's inner circle. He was said to have been in charge of crushing opposition during the Libyan civil war.

Mutassim was captured by anti-Gaddafi rebel forces during the Battle of Sirte, in the First Libyan Civil War, and killed along with his father.

== Role in Libyan politics ==
=== Negotiations with the US ===
In April 2009, Mutassim Gaddafi met U.S. Secretary of State Hillary Clinton, the highest-level diplomatic exchange between the two countries since they had resumed diplomatic relations several years earlier. For Gaddafi, it was a serious display of his new responsibilities as the National Security Advisor. He overreached his role as NSA in 2008 by requesting $1.2 billion from the National Oil Corporation to form his own special forces brigade.

Mutassim Gaddafi met U.S. Senators John McCain and Joseph Lieberman in 2009, expressing a strong need for military support in Libya. Gaddafi warned, "There are 60 million Algerians to the West, 80 million Egyptians to the East, we have Europe in front of us, and we face Sub-Saharan Africa with its problems to the South." He was concerned about upgrading Libya's military equipment, and said he could purchase arms from Russia and China, but wanted to buy materiel from the United States.

=== Possible successor ===
Mutassim Gaddafi lived in Egypt for several years after allegedly attempting to take control of Libya from his father. During his exile, his father ordered the disbandment of his 77th Tank Battalion and created the 32nd Reinforced Brigade (better known as Khamis Brigade) in its place. Mutassim's return led to a reconciliation with his father and a high-ranking position as National Security Advisor of Libya. After his return, Mutassim requested $1.2 billion from the chairman of Libya's National Oil Corporation in order to re-create a "military/security unit" to rival the Khamis Brigade, ran by his younger brother Khamis Gaddafi.

In 2005, Mutassim was involved in an armed confrontation with his half-brother Muhammad over control of a bottling plant Coca-Cola had opened in Libya.

In 2009, a story linking Mutassim Gaddafi to the death of Ibn al-Shaykh al-Libi was published in the Libyan newspaper Oea with permission from his brother Saif al-Islam.

=== Libyan civil war ===
During the Libyan Civil War, Gaddafi commanded the units in the Brega region notably during the Battle of Brega–Ajdabiya road and the skirmishes in the area. He had been subject to a travel ban and an asset freeze over his close links and membership of his father's inner circle.

Gaddafi was allegedly in Tripoli in the Bab al-Azizia compound, and assisting in commanding what remained of pro-Gaddafi forces in the city during the Battle of Tripoli. However, no evidence of his presence was found by rebels when they captured the compound, nor was there evidence of a presence of any of his sons.

He commanded the loyalist forces in their unsuccessful defense of Sirte, Muammar Gaddafi's hometown, until the city fell.

It is believed Mutassim commanded the crackdown of protests.

== Personal life and legal issues ==
Mutassim was Muammar Gaddafi's fourth son by his second wife, Safia Farkash. He was known for his extravagant playboy lifestyle. He would often travel to Saint Barts in his private Boeing jet around Christmas time, book several floors in the most expensive hotels in London and Paris, which several friends would stay in, and would fly in Italian hairdressers for over €5,000. He allegedly spent over $1 million each on two New Year's parties at St. Barts in 2009 and 2010, which featured private performances by Mariah Carey, Beyoncé, and Usher.

Gaddafi enrolled at SOAS University of London in 2006.

One of his former girlfriends, Dutch glamour model Talitha Van Zon, who met him in 2004 at an Italian nightclub, visited him in Tripoli during the Libyan Civil War and stated that he envied his brother Saif Al-Arab's "martyrdom." Although his relationship with Van Zon lasted three months, they remained friends and she would often accompany him while traveling. He would often give her lavish gifts. He was also described as ambitious and “wanted to do better than his father.” He also loved to discuss various authoritarian leaders including Adolf Hitler, Fidel Castro, and Hugo Chavez. Model Vanessa Hessler admitted to a four-year relationship with him, and she continued to defend him even after his death. He also allegedly had a child with Dutch model Lisa van Goinga, who was married to Libyan arm smuggler Tarek Kaituni.

Gaddafi was tied to a prostitution ring involving the Cannes Film Festival. He was accused of sexual assault by one of Van Zon's friends who had accompanied her to Tripoli. The charges were filed in Amsterdam and also pressed charges against Van Zon. Van Zon denied the allegations of trafficking on Dutch public radio.

== Death ==
Mutassim was captured when Sirte fell on 20 October 2011. NTC commanders at the front in Sirte and officials in Tripoli claimed that he was captured as he was trying to leave the city in a family car, and sent off to Benghazi.

According to one of the rebels, when captured, he started shooting a pistol at the rebels when he was found. He was then shot in the throat and after arguing with them about religion he was shot again, and his necklace was taken and burned. Published film and photographs of Gaddafi indicate that he was unconscious and injured, but he seemed to be alive when he was captured by a group of young men appearing to be in their late teens or early twenties after apparently succumbing to nerve gas. He was made to drink water and requested a cigarette. Later photographs released by Saudi TV channel Al Arabiya show Mutassim lying dead on a hospital bed, with gaping wounds in his throat and abdomen and one of his arms had been dislocated. Amateur photographs and videos showed his young captors and others defiling his corpse after his death. Like his father, he was denied a burial within a day after death in accordance with Islamic law.
