= Khamis Brigade =

32nd Reinforced Brigade of the Armed People
- Brigade SSI
- Active: 2003–2011
- Country: Libya
- Type: Mechanized infantry
- Role: Heavy Mechanized
- Size: 10,000
- Nickname: Khamis Brigade
- Engagements: First Libyan Civil War: First Battle of Zawiya; Battle of Misrata; Battle of Ajdabiya; Battle of the Misrata frontline; Libyan rebel coastal offensive; Second Battle of Zawiya; Battle of Bani Walid; Battle of Sirte; Battle of Tripoli (2011)

Commanders
- Notable commanders: Khamis Gaddafi †

The Khamis Brigade (Arabic: كتيبة خميس), formally the 32nd Reinforced Brigade of the Armed People (Arabic: اللواء 32 المعزز للشعب المسلح), was a regime security brigade of the Libyan Armed Forces loyal to Muammar Gaddafi, the leader of Libya from 1969 until 2011. The 32nd Brigade was commanded by Gaddafi's youngest son, Khamis Gaddafi and was called "the most well-trained and well-equipped force in the Libyan military" and "the most important military and security elements of the regime" in leaked U.S. memos.

In 2009, according to news reports, Belgian arms manufacturers delivered 11.5 million € worth of small arms and ammunition to the 32nd Brigade. The aim, according to the Walloon government, was to protect humanitarian convoys heading for Darfur in the Sudan.

== Role in the First Libyan Civil War ==
The Khamis Brigade was described as the most elite of the three "regime protection units" which together comprised 10,000 men. According to U.S. and European officials, these units were directly loyal to Gaddafi, whereas regular army units made up of conscripts were subject to widespread desertion. The Khamis Brigade engaged anti-government forces and was reported by eyewitnesses to be moving into Benghazi, Bayda and several other cities that were centers of anti-government protests on 19 February 2011 in the company of militias, possibly including foreign mercenaries. Al Arabiya, citing sources in Benghazi, reported that Khamis Gaddafi had recruited French-speaking mercenaries from sub-Saharan Africa.

On 24 February, armored units commanded by Khamis Gaddafi were reported to be moving toward Misrata, Libya's third-largest city and a major port, said to be in the hands of rebels. Meanwhile, multinational mercenaries commanded by the group killed scores and injured dozens in Zawiya, a city symbolic for its resistance to Italian colonization. Local witnesses and speeches by Gaddafi described a chaotic situation with people in civilian clothes fighting one another in the streets. According to former justice minister Mustafa Abdul Jalil, Khamis Gaddafi and two of his brothers were stationed in security centers to the east, west, and south of Tripoli.

The Aruba School in the rebel-held coastal town of Shahhat became the prison for almost 200 suspected mercenaries of the Gaddafi regime from countries such as Niger and Chad. They were reported to be part of Libya's "Khamis' battalion".

On 27 February, residents reported heavy fighting around the Khamis Brigade's headquarters complex in Misrata. An air force school within the complex had been besieged by protesters with light weapons. Despite possessing heavier weaponry, those within had run out of food and water, and a commander surrendered himself for trial. Another report stated that officers at the air force school had mutinied and the adjacent air force base had been overwhelmed.

On 18 April, the headquarters of the Khamis Brigade near Tripoli was bombed and destroyed by NATO planes that took part in the 2011 military intervention in Libya. According to NATO sources, the headquarters had been used to coordinate and lead attacks on civilians.

On 21 August, the Khamis Brigade headquarters 26 kilometres (16 mi) west of Tripoli was overrun by rebel forces as they made a major push towards the capital, allowing rebels to capture large stores of weapons. At this date, the Khamis Brigade were reported to have killed 17 prisoners in a makeshift prison near Gragur in Tripoli. On 23 August 2011, the Khamis Brigade killed around 50 prisoners in a Tripoli warehouse and then set fire to the warehouse.

On 29 August 2011, Khamis Gaddafi was killed in fighting in Tarhuna, On 9 September, the NTC health minister said that the Khamis Brigade had lost around 9,000 soldiers during the war, it is unknown who may have commanded remnants of the Khamis Brigade in the closing days of the 2011 Libyan civil war.

== See also ==
- 4th Armoured Division (Syria)
- Republican Guard (Syria)
