= Khamis Gaddafi =

Libyan military commander (1983–2011)

Khamis Gaddafi خميس القذافي
- Born: 27 May 1983; Tripoli, Libya
- Died: 29 August 2011 (aged 28); Near Tarhuna, Libya
- Resting place: Old Manasla Cemetery, Bani Walid, Libya
- Education: Frunze Military Academy; General Staff Academy; IE Business School
- Parents: Muammar Gaddafi; Safia Farkash
- Military career
- Allegiance: Libyan Arab Jamahiriya
- Branch: Libyan Army
- Service years: 2003–2011
- Commands: Khamis Brigade
- Conflicts: First Libyan Civil War

Khamis Gaddafi (Arabic: خميس القذافي, romanized: Ḫamīs al-Qaḏḏāfī; 27 May 1983 – 29 August 2011) was the seventh and youngest son of former Libyan leader Muammar Gaddafi, and the military commander in charge of the Khamis Brigade of the Libyan Army. He was part of his father's inner circle. During the First Libyan Civil War, he was a major target for rebel forces trying to overthrow his father.

== Education and career ==
At age three, Khamis Gaddafi was injured in the 15 April 1986 U.S. bombing of Libya, suffering head injuries when the Bab al-Azizia military compound was attacked in retaliation for the 1986 Berlin discotheque bombing.

He graduated from the military academy in Tripoli, receiving a bachelor's degree in military arts and science, further graduating from the Frunze Military Academy in Moscow and the Military Academy of the General Staff of the Armed Forces of Russia. In 2008, Gaddafi visited Algeria, where he was received by President Abdelaziz Bouteflika.

Khamis, who was said to be uninterested in politics, rose in prominence in the 2000s due to the exile of his older brother Mutassim, who was sent to Egypt in 2001 after being accused by senior officials of plotting to seize power from his father. Muammar Gaddafi ordered the disbandment of Mutassim's 77th Tank Battalion and created the 32nd Reinforced Brigade (better known as Khamis Brigade) in its place. By most accounts, Khamis was competent, loyal to his father, and maintained good relations with his siblings. He was especially close to his reformist older brother Saif al-Islam and spent considerable time with him in the early phase of the Arab Spring.

In April 2010, he began a master's degree at the IE Business School (formerly known as Instituto de Empresa), in Madrid. However, he was expelled by the institution in March 2011 for "his links to the attacks against the Libyan population".

In early 2011, Gaddafi worked as an intern at AECOM Technology Corporation. According to Paul Gennaro, AECOM's Senior Vice President for Global Communications, Gaddafi was touring the United States in February 2011 as part of his internship, including visiting military sites and landmarks. This trip was cut short on 17 February after the Libyan Civil War began, and Gaddafi returned to Libya. U.S. government officials later denied any role in planning, advising or paying for the trip.

== Role in the Libyan civil war ==
After hurrying back to Libya to aid his father in the civil war, Khamis commanded the assault on Zawiya, leading the Khamis Brigade, a special forces brigade of the Libyan Armed Forces loyal to Muammar Gaddafi. The battle resulted in pro-Gaddafi forces retaking the city.

He also assisted in suppressing anti-regime demonstrations in and around the capital Tripoli in late February-early March. His forces also took part in the Battle of Misrata. In June 2011, he was reported to be commanding pro-Gaddafi forces in Zliten by a soldier captured from his brigade who also reported that Khamis had told his troops to "take Misrata or I will kill you myself. If you don't take Misrata, we are finished."

== Rumors of death ==
=== Libyan civil war ===
==== 13 March 2011: Alleged suicide attack on Bab al-Azizia ====
On 20 March 2011, it was reported by the anti-Gaddafi Al Manara Media that Khamis had died from injuries sustained when pilot Muhammad Mokhtar Osman allegedly crashed his plane into Bab al-Azizia a week earlier. This was not confirmed by any independent news source. The crashing of the plane itself had also not been previously reported or confirmed by any independent media except Al Manara and the Algerian Shuruk newspaper, which is closely connected to Al Manara, and with it there is a possibility of the reports being part of the propaganda operations by the opposition.

The pro-Gaddafi Libyan government subsequently denied that Khamis was killed on 21 March. U.S. Secretary of State Hillary Clinton stated that she was aware of reports that one of Gaddafi's sons had been killed in non-coalition air strikes, after hearing them from "many different sources", but that the "evidence is not sufficient" for her to confirm this. On 25 March 2011, Al Arabiya television reported that a source had confirmed the death of Khamis, though others including Al Jazeera continued to call it a rumor.

On 29 March 2011, the Libyan government showed what it said was live footage of Khamis greeting supporters in Tripoli, in an attempt to refute the claims, though it had used false live images before and these images were not verified. On 9 June 2011, a captured pro-Gaddafi soldier in Misrata told the rebels that Khamis was alive in Zliten, and was leading the soldiers there.

==== 5 August 2011: Airstrike in Zliten ====
On 5 August 2011, citing spies operating among the ranks of forces loyal to Muammar Gaddafi, Mohammed Zawawi, a spokesman for the United Revolutionary Forces, told the Agence France Press news agency that Khamis had been killed overnight, stating that "there was an aircraft attack by NATO on the Gaddafi operations room in Zliten and there are around 32 Gaddafi troops killed. One of them is Khamis."

This report was officially denied by Libyan government spokesman Moussa Ibrahim. "It's false news. They invented the news about Mr. Khamis Gaddafi in Zliten to cover up their killing," Ibrahim told Reuters in Tripoli. "This is a dirty trick to cover up their crime in Zliten and the killing of the al-Marabit family." NATO was also unable to confirm the reports of Khamis's death. On 9 August, a man who appeared to be Khamis was on Libyan state television speaking to a woman who had allegedly been severely injured by a NATO airstrike.

==== 22 August 2011: Reports of bodies in Tripoli ====
On 22 August, Al Jazeera reported that the bodies of both Khamis and his father's intelligence chief Abdullah Senussi may have been discovered in Tripoli during the battle for the city. However, a rebel commander later stated that he believed Khamis was in Bab al-Azizia.

Senussi was found alive and captured in Mauritania on 17 March 2012, and was extradited to Libya on 5 September for trial.

==== 29 August 2011: Airstrike near Tarhuna ====
On 29 August, it was reported that anti-Gaddafi fighters 60 km south of Tripoli claimed that a NATO Apache helicopter had fired on Khamis Gaddafi's Toyota Land Cruiser, destroying the vehicle. A man who claimed to be Khamis Gaddafi's bodyguard said he had been killed. No visual confirmation was immediately available. Several days later, The Guardian interviewed a former guard being held captive in Tarhuna. His personal guard, Abdul Salam Taher Fagri, a 17-year-old from Sabha, recruited in Tripoli, later confirmed that Khamis was indeed killed in this attack. He told the newspaper "I was in the truck behind him ... when his car was hit. He was burned." Three other guards being held in separate cells apparently gave similar accounts, leading their captors to believe the accounts of all four to be credible. Some accounts of the attack that reportedly killed Gaddafi suggested fire from a technical, rather than a helicopter, destroyed his vehicle.

The National Transitional Council claimed on 4 September that it was now certain Khamis was dead and had been buried near Bani Walid. In mid-September 2011, a report stated that Gaddafi was in Bani Walid, but had left the city and his men to their fate. However, the International Business Times reported on 15 September that Khamis Gaddafi was still presumed dead. On 15 October, the Syrian-based pro-Gaddafi TV station Arrai TV posted a message mourning his death on 29 August.

In April 2012, New York Times journalist Robert Worth met with former Tripoli Yarmouk prison captor Marwan Gdoura, who confessed that after the execution of around 100 prisoners he fled the city with some 200 loyalists under the command of Khamis Gaddafi, who was killed in gunbattle. Afterwards, he witnessed his older brother Saif al-Islam Gaddafi receiving condolences in Bani Walid.

On 17 October 2012, a report from Human Rights Watch said "Khamis Gaddafi, a son of Muammar who commanded the elite 32nd "Khamis" Brigade of the Libyan military, was killed on 29 August as he fled Tripoli, in what is believed to have been a NATO airstrike on his convoy.

In February 2026, Khamis was confirmed to have been buried in Bani Walid, Libya.

=== Posthumous allegations and later burial confirmation ===
On 29 August 2011, the International Criminal Court was reportedly planning to charge Khamis with crimes against humanity. Khamis reportedly died in a NATO airstrike later that same day.

At least one report published after the capture of Saif al-Islam Gaddafi asserted that the older Gaddafi told interrogators that Khamis Gaddafi was still alive and may be hiding in Tarhuna. On 25 February 2012, Stratfor reported the capture of Khamis Gaddafi by fighters from Zintan. This was denied by the NTC.

Amid a military campaign against Gaddafi loyalists in Bani Walid, the deputy prime minister of Libya claimed in a tweet that Khamis Gaddafi was killed during fighting in the town on 20 October 2012, a year to the day Gaddafi's father Muammar was captured and killed by rebel forces in Sirte. A statement from the Libyan National Congress's spokesman, Omar Hamdan, claimed Gaddafi was killed "in battle", but gave no further details. His body was purportedly found after a day of heavy fighting between the town's pro-Gaddafi garrison and militias allied to the Libyan government.

A government spokesman denied that there was any official confirmation about the capture of Mussa Ibrahim to Agence France-Presse, and did not even talk about the rumor of Khamis Gaddafi's death. The Associated Press described the report of Gaddafi's death as an unconfirmed rumor. Musa Ibrahim, the former spokesman of Muammar Gaddafi, personally disproved the message on the arrest saying he was not even in Libya and denied the most recent reports on the death of Khamis. On 24 October, government spokesman Nasser Al-Manaa retracted and apologized for false reports from the government and the National Congress regarding the killing of Gaddafi and the capture of Ibrahim.

Khamis was later confirmed to have been buried in Bani Walid, with elder brother Saif al-Islam Gaddafi later being buried next to him in February 2026.
