= Muhammad Gaddafi =

First son of former Libyan leader Muammar Gaddafi (born 1970)

Muhammad Gaddafi محمد القذافي
- Born: 15 March 1970 (age 56); Tripoli, Libya
- Parent(s): Muammar Gaddafi (father); Fathia Nuri (mother)

Muhammad Muammar Gaddafi (Arabic: محمد معمر القذافي, romanized: Muḥammad Muʿammar al-Qaḏḏāfī; born 15 March 1970) is the eldest son of the former Libyan leader Muammar Gaddafi. While he was regarded as a possible successor to his father as ruler of Libya, he was reportedly uninterested in the role. In 2005, Muhammad was involved in an armed standoff with his half-brother Mutassim over the control of a Coca-Cola bottling plant.

He was also the chairman of the General Posts and Telecommunications Company which owned and operated cell phone and satellite services in Libya and the temporary head of the Libyan Football Federation at the time. The company is the exclusive internet provider in Libya, and immediately after the beginning of protests against the Gaddafi government in February 2011 which led to the Libyan Civil War, it cut internet links between Libya and the rest of the world.

== Libyan civil war ==
On 30 April 2011, one of Muhammad's children was killed by a NATO airstrike along with his half-brother Saif al-Arab Gaddafi. Muhammad was among the 2,000 mourners at Saif al-Arab's funeral along with his half-brother Saif al-Islam on 2 May 2011.

On 21 August 2011, Muhammad surrendered to rebel forces of the National Transitional Council as they took over Tripoli. While held in custody in his home, he gave a phone interview to Al Jazeera, saying that he surrendered to the rebels and had been treated well before the line went dead from apparent gunfire. The National Transitional Council head later spoke to Al Jazeera assuring Muhammad's safety. Muhammad spoke to Al Jazeera again confirming his safety and that of his family.

On 22 August 2011, he escaped reportedly with the help of Gaddafi loyalists.

=== In exile ===
On 29 August 2011, he entered Algeria along with several other members of the Gaddafi family. In October 2012, they left a hideaway in Algeria to go to Oman, where they were granted political asylum. As of 2023, he was reported to reside in the Sultanate of Oman.
