= Bab al-Azizia =

Military compound in Tripoli, Libya

- باب العزيزية
- Tripoli, Libya
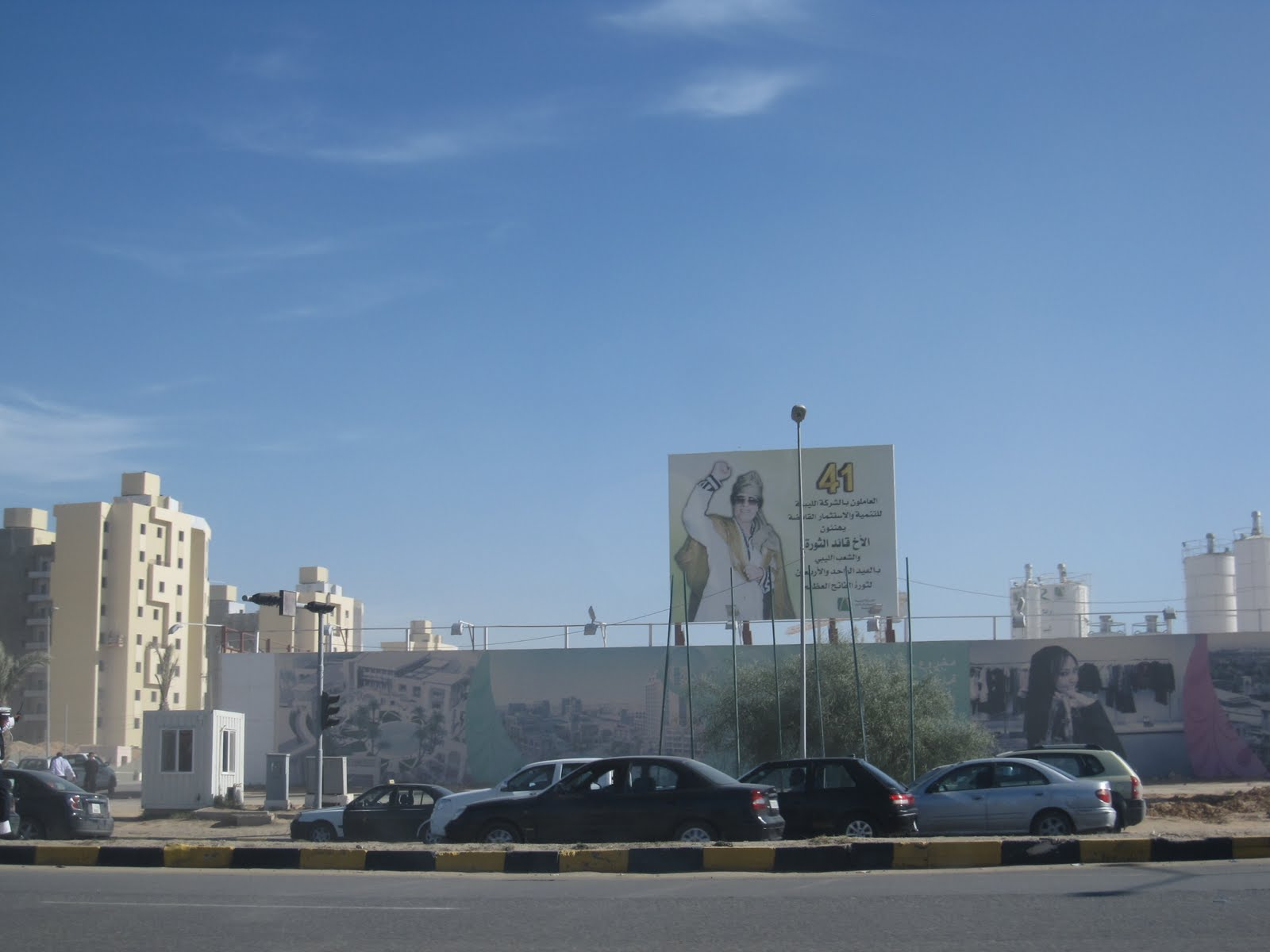
- Gaddafi on a billboard at Bab al-Azizia celebrating his 41st year of leading Libya, 2010.

Site information
- Type: Military barracks and compound
- Controlled by: Libyan Army (pro-GNU)

Location
- Coordinates: 32°52′20″N 13°10′25″E

Site history
- Demolished: 30 October 2011
- Events: 1986 bombing of Libya; Libyan Civil War; Battle of Tripoli

Garrison information
- Past commanders: Abdelhakim Belhaj

Bab al-Azizia (Arabic: باب العزيزية, romanized: Bāb al ‘Azīzīyah, Libyan pronunciation: [bæːb əl ʕæziːˈzijjæ], lit. 'The Splendid Gate') was a military barracks and compound situated in the southern suburbs of Tripoli, the capital of Libya. It served as the main base for the Libyan leader Muammar Gaddafi until its capture by anti-Gaddafi forces on 23 August 2011, during the Battle of Tripoli in the Libyan Civil War.

The 6-square-kilometre (2.3 sq mi) base is strategically located south of Tripoli city center at the northern end of Airport Highway, allowing easy access to government assets within the city as well as direct high-speed road access to Tripoli International Airport.

After the Libyan Civil War, the compound was partially demolished. Some parts of it remain today, albeit in disrepair. The plan, however, is to eventually demolish the entire compound and turn it into a park to be “enjoyed by people of Tripoli and guests”.

== Structure ==
Originally an Italian army base before and during World War II, the barracks were occupied by British forces in December 1945. The compound was rebuilt by King Idris, the previous ruler of Libya. Gaddafi reinforced and expanded the compound in the 1980s with the help of foreign contractors. It was surrounded by three concrete walls, each with slits for weapons. The walls were estimated to be four-meters high and one meter thick with complicated gate structures. Inside, there were fields with trees, access to water, Gaddafi's private residence, and a number of military barracks used by troops led by Gaddafi's sons. Also, on the property was a mosque, a football pitch, a swimming pool, communications center and other administrative structures with roadways. The interior walls were lower and surrounded a more secure area with guards and metal detectors.

The buildings were connected by extensive networks of tunnels that lead to adjoining districts and possibly stretched to the coast of the Mediterranean Sea, which is 3.2 kilometres (2.0 mi) away, and elsewhere in the city of Tripoli. Gaddafi lived in a Bedouin-style air-conditioned tent on the grounds, which he occasionally pitched in the cities he visited. In 2009, he attempted to camp in Central Park, when he was in New York for the United Nations General Assembly. On a visit to Russia, the tent was pitched in a garden at the Kremlin.

Within the barracks there were facilities for banquets and other public events like pro-Gaddafi rallies. It was described by US intelligence reports published via WikiLeaks as "not lavish in any way compared with the ostentation of the Gulf-oil-state families or Hariri clan [in Lebanon]."

== History ==
=== 1984 coup attempt ===
On 8 May 1984, the compound witnessed a coup attempt by the National Front for the Salvation of Libya.

=== 1986 bombing of Libya ===
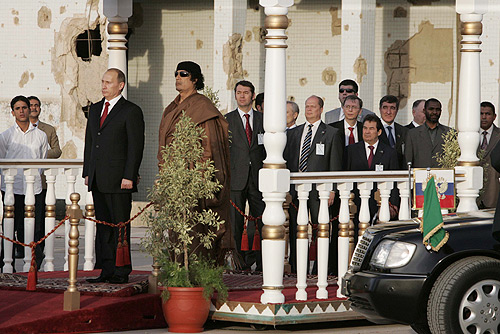
Muammar Gaddafi with Vladimir Putin at Bab al-Azizia

The site was the main target of the 15 April 1986 United States bombing of Libya, authorized by U.S. President Ronald Reagan, in response to the West Berlin discotheque bombing by the Libyan government.

Forewarned by both Maltese Prime Minister Karmenu Mifsud Bonnici and Italian Prime Minister Bettino Craxi that unauthorized aircraft were flying over Maltese airspace heading south towards Tripoli, Gaddafi and his family rushed out of their residence in the compound moments before the bombs dropped from thirteen U.S. Air Force planes. Gaddafi escaped injury, but he claimed his fifteen-month-old, adopted daughter Hanna was killed and that two of his sons were injured. These claims have been disputed. After the capture of Bab al-Azizia in August 2011, documents were found proving Hanna could still be alive, including her passport, and documents which show Hanna supposedly became a doctor and worked in Tripoli.

Damaged and hence unused for a period of time, official state receptions moved to the main military barracks buildings for a period, before the Gaddafi family reoccupied their section of the compound.

To express defiance over the bombing, a monument was erected at the compound depicting a left-handed fist crushing a U.S. fighter jet. Gaddafi used this monument as a backdrop for speeches given during the uprising and civil war in February and March 2011.

=== 2011 bombings, rebel capture, and demolition ===
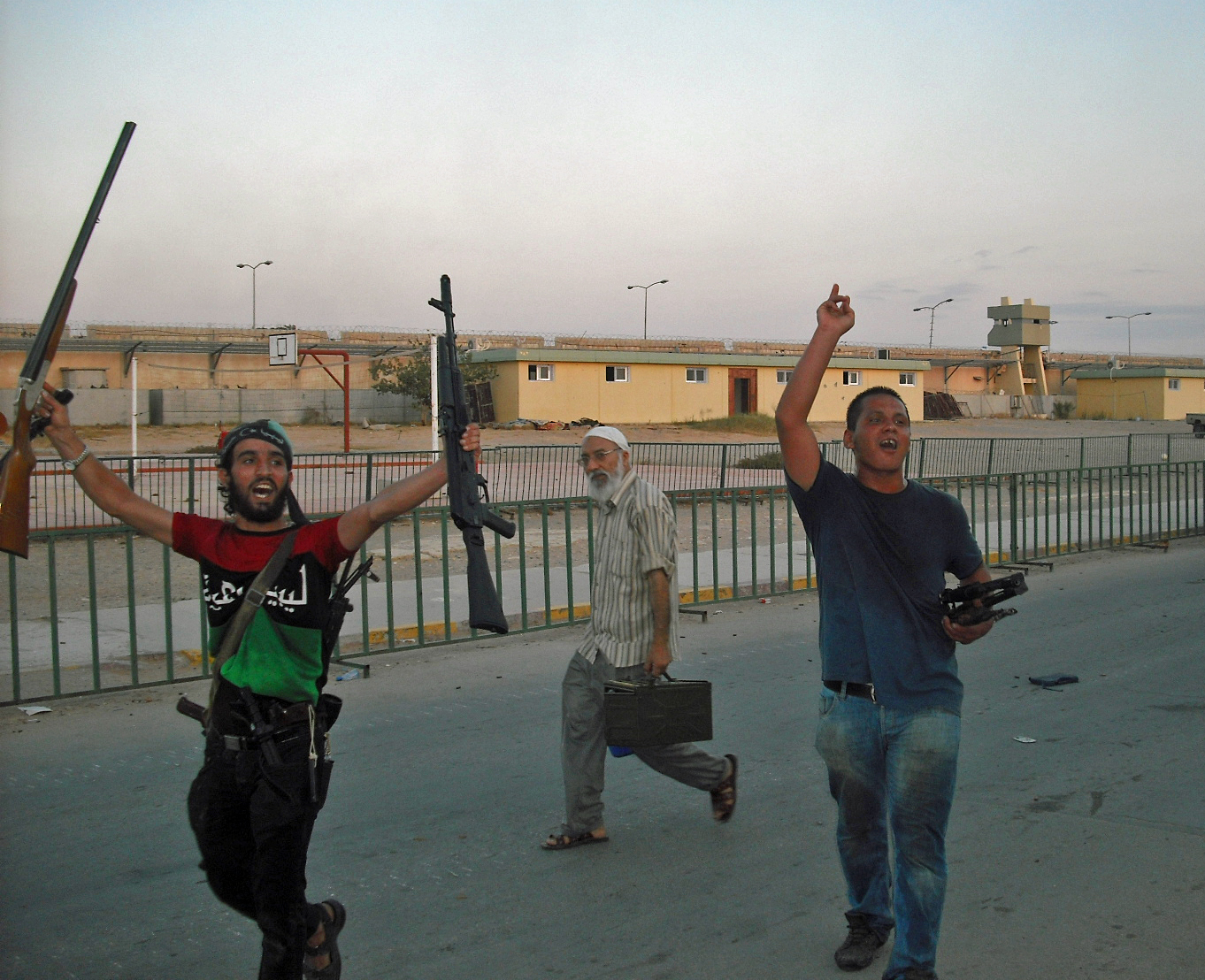
Rebels cheer as they occupy Gaddafi's HQ in August 2011.

The compound became a target once more when the Libyan Civil War broke out in 2011. In March of that year, an international coalition led by NATO launched a military intervention in the conflict, bombing loyalist military units and command-and-control centers. Bab al-Azizia was identified as one such center, and was bombed repeatedly throughout the war.

In August, at the height of the Battle of Tripoli, Bab al-Azizia became one of the last strongholds of loyalist forces in the capital, along with the Rixos Al Nasr hotel. However, on 23 August, the compound's guards surrendered, and it was captured by rebel forces. Fighters vandalized a statue of Gaddafi as well as the iconic sculpture of a fist crushing a U.S. fighter jet, which had been commissioned by Gaddafi after the 1986 bombing, and one rebel was filmed by Sky News wearing several items of clothing he had taken from Gaddafi's bedroom. Despite previous reports that Gaddafi and his family may have been inside the compound, they were nowhere to be seen upon its capture; it was later discovered that they had fled to Sirte.

The compound was opened to the public, and its condition gradually deteriorated as it was vandalized by anti-Gaddafi protesters. It became a tourist attraction, and in early October Tripoli's Friday market moved into the compound. On 17 October, bulldozers began to demolish the outer walls, but stopped short of levelling the entire compound. As of February 2012, many buildings had been reduced to rubble and what survived of the compound was in a state of major disrepair. Al Arabiya reported that several families had set up makeshift homes in the former compound due to high living costs elsewhere. Although no plans have been solidified, there are proposals for the new government to complete the demolition of the compound and build a park on its land.
