= Hannibal Gaddafi =

Son of former Libyan leader Muammar Gaddafi (born 1976)

- هانيبال القذافي

Personal details
- Born: 20 September 1975 (age 51) Tripoli, Libyan Arab Republic
- Spouse: Aline Skaf (m. 2003)
- Children: 3 (+1 deceased)
- Parent(s): Muammar Gaddafi (father); Safia Farkash (mother)
- Education: Arab Academy for Science and Technology and Maritime Transport; Copenhagen Business School

Hannibal Muammar Gaddafi (Arabic: هانيبال معمر القذافي, romanized: Hānībāl al-Qaḏḏāfī; born 20 September 1975) is the fifth son of former Libyan leader Muammar Gaddafi and his second wife, Safia Farkash.

== Biography ==
Gaddafi was born in Tripoli. He started his maritime career by joining the Marine Academy of Maritime Studies, Libya in 1993 as a deck cadet. He graduated in 1999 as a watch-keeping officer with a BSc degree in marine navigation.

Soon after graduation, Gaddafi began his maritime career on board various vessels of General National Maritime Transport Company (GNMTC) of Libya. He obtained successfully the combined chief officer and Master Mariner qualification from the Arab Maritime Academy for Science, Technology and Maritime Transport in Alexandria in 2003.

Gaddafi was the first consultant to the Management Committee of the GNMTC. He was appointed to this position in 2007, upon earning his MBA degree in Shipping Economics and Logistics from Copenhagen Business School.

=== Legal issues ===
In 2008, Swiss authorities arrested Gaddafi and his wife, Aline Skaf, on charges of "bodily harm, threatening behavior and coercion," after an incident involving two staffers at the Gaddafis' hotel in Geneva. The charges were later dropped, but relations between Libya and Switzerland soured. In 2009, two Swiss citizens, Max Goeldi and Rachid Hamdani, were detained in Libya; the Swiss government asserted that the detention was retaliation against them for Gaddafi's arrest.

Also in 2008, Gaddafi lost a lawsuit he brought in Denmark against the Danish newspaper, Ekstra Bladet. The newspaper reported that in 2005, Gaddafi, then a student in Copenhagen, had directed the abduction and beating of a Libyan national at the home of the Libyan consul in Gentofte. Gaddafi failed to appear in court to present his side of the case, and the court ruled that the existing evidence supported Ekstra Bladet's version of events.

In 2009, police were called to Claridge's Hotel in London in response to reports of a woman screaming. When they arrived, the suite was locked, and three bodyguards were arrested for obstructing entry. Gaddafi's wife was found in the room bleeding heavily and was taken by ambulance to hospital where she was treated for facial injuries.

=== Flight from Libya ===
On 29 August 2011 after the rebels entered Tripoli, Gaddafi and his wife fled from Libya to Algeria together with other members of the Gaddafi family.

In October 2012 they left a hideaway in Algeria to go to Oman, where they were granted political asylum. He later moved to Syria with his wife and children.

Shweyga Mullah, an Ethiopian nanny who cared for the couple's young daughter and son, was found abandoned by the rebels in a room at one of the family's luxury seaside villas in western Tripoli. She claimed that Aline Skaf took her to a bathroom, tied her up, taped her mouth and started pouring boiling water on her head after she lost her temper when Mullah refused to beat her daughter who was crying. Then Mullah was denied sleep, food and water for three days. Another member of staff, who did not want to give his name, verified Mullah's story and said that he also had been regularly beaten and slashed with knives.

=== Captivity in Lebanon ===
On 11 December 2015, Hannibal was kidnapped and held in Lebanon by an armed group demanding information about the disappearance of Shiite Imam Musa al-Sadr, Sheikh Muhammad Yaacoub, and journalist Abbas Badreddine, but was later released in the city of Zahlé.

After being released from his kidnapping, an arrest warrant was issued against Hannibal by the Lebanese government over the disappearance of al-Sadr, and he was arrested. A request by the Syrian government to return Gaddafi on the grounds that he was a political refugee was denied by the Lebanese government, claiming he was a wanted man in Lebanon for withholding information regarding the disappearance of al-Sadr. In August 2016, al-Sadr's family filed a lawsuit against Gaddafi over his role in the disappearance of the Imam, despite the fact that Sadr's disappearance in 1978 occurred when Hannibal was two years old.

In 2019, Russia, which developed close ties with Hannibal's older brother Saif al-Islam, allegedly pushed for Hannibal's release and offered him asylum in Moscow.

Hannibal cited the fact that he was just three years old at the time of the event as proof of his innocence. He also stated that his father Muammar did not meet Sadr in August 1978 as he was in Sirte. Instead, Sadr and his entourage were hosted by Libyan Prime Minister Abdessalam Jalloud in Tripoli. Hannibal claimed that Jalloud, and Ahmed Gaddaf al-Dam were the only living people with knowledge about Sadr's disappearance.

His older brother Saif al-Islam attempted to negotiate his release behind the scenes through intermediaries, including Lebanese businessman Mohammed Jamil Derbah (a former associate of the late British gangster John Palmer), French-Algerian lobbyist Tayeb Benabderrahmane and French-Iraqi businessman Souha al-Bedri. Several foreign governments, including Turkey, also lobbied for Hannibal's release, but their efforts were blocked at the highest level by the Shia-dominated Amal Movement and Hezbollah. Several associates of former French President Nicolas Sarkozy, including paparazzi Michèle Marchand and businessman Noël Dubus, were allegedly involved in a plot to free Hannibal in exchange for Hannibal's testimony absolving Sarkozy in the alleged Libyan financing in the 2007 French presidential election scandal.

The BBC reported in June 2023 that Hannibal had gone on hunger strike to protest against his prolonged detention in Lebanon. According to one of his lawyers, Hannibal had “spasms in his muscles, hands and legs, dizziness and headaches, and prior medical problems in his spine and hips deteriorated" because of his hunger strike. On 22 June 2023, Hannibal was hospitalized in Lebanon after a two-week hunger strike. On 2 July 2023, Hannibal was reportedly hospitalized again after suffering a sharp drop in his blood sugar level.

In January 2024, Human Rights Watch (HRW) called on Lebanon to release Hannibal Gaddafi, saying he had been held on "spurious charges" for eight years.

On 17 October 2025, a Lebanese court ordered the release of Hannibal Gaddafi, who had been detained for ten years without trial, on bail of $11 million. Following the visit of a Libyan delegation, the bail amount was reduced to $900,000.

On 6 November 2025, the Government of National Unity announced the release of Hannibal Gaddafi after posting bail. The Lebanese authorities also expressed "a response that led to the decision to release the person concerned and cancel the imposed bail, within the framework of the spirit of brotherhood and historical relations that unite the two brotherly peoples," and to activate diplomatic relations between Libya and Lebanon. Lebanese authorities also lifted a ban on Gaddafi traveling abroad.

South African authorities agreed to host Hannibal Gaddafi in November 2025, following his release from prison in Lebanon.

== Personal life ==
Gaddafi married, in 2003, Aline Skaf, a Lebanese Christian former lingerie model, with whom he has three children. Another child, Carthage Hannibal (2 August 2008 – 30 April 2011), was killed in the bombing raid of the family compound on 30 April 2011.

While Hannibal Gaddafi was being detained in Lebanon, his wife Aline was living in Damascus with their children. In January 2021, she was suspected of ramming her car into police and pedestrians in a road rage attack in Damascus.
