= Ahmad Nabil al-Alam =

Head of Libyan Olympic committee

Nabil Elalam
- Born: Ahmed Nabil Elalem
- Occupation: Engineering Lecturer

Ahmed Nabil Elalam was the president of the Libyan Olympic Committee.

== Biography ==
Nabil Elalem is a Libyan popular Sports Figure and well-known Engineer. He was born in Libya 1965. His father "Taher Elalem" is one of the founding fathers of the Libyan Kingdom in 1951 and of the six people committee that wrote the Libya Constitution. A holder of a Ph.D. and three Master's degrees, two in Mechanical Engineering/manufacturing from Wayne State University (USA) and Universiti Sains Malaysia (Malaysia), and a Master in Biomechanics (Teaching and Teaching Judo University of Rome Tor Vergata (Italy), and mechanical engineering/solid mechanics (USA Department of Mechanical Engineering, Wayne State University)

=== Education ===
- Ph.D. in Mechanical Engineering (Wire Additive Manufacturing), Wayne State University College of Engineering, Detroit, MI 48202

- Master of Science in Mechanical Engineering, Wayne State University College of Engineering, Detroit, MI 48202

- Master of Science in Mechanical Engineering (Manufacturing) University of Science Malaysia, Penang, Malaysia

- Bachler of Science in Mechanical and Production Engineering Bright Star of Technology) Bregahttps://www1.udel.edu/udaily/2012/feb/icecp-libya-olympics-021012.html, Libya

=== Academic career ===
He was a lecturer at the University of Tripoli, Teaching in the Department of Mechanical and Industrial Engineering. .He taught during his Ph.D. study in the College of Engineering, Wayne State University

=== Sport career ===
He was president of the Libyan Judo Federation from 2005 to 2013. Elalam was the coach of the Libyan and Malaysian judo teams during the 1990s. He also served as head of the Libyan Football Association National Teams Department during the reign of Muammar Gaddafi. Mohammed Gaddafi was al-Alam's predecessor as Olympic Committee president. He was the head of the African Judo Union.

AWARDS

• 2008 - World Peace Diplomat Award • 2008 - Awarded the Degree of Grand Master by the International Martial Arts Association Festival in Kuala Lumpur –Malaysia • 2008 - International Judo Federation Gold Medal Award • 2009 – Gold Medal Of Saint Louis City (Senegal)

==== Career as an Athlete ====
1981, 82, 83, 85 – Libyan Champion (71 kg)
1986, 87, 88 – Libyan Champion (78 kg)
1981 to 1990 – Libyan National Judo Team
1986 – 1st place in friendly International Tournament-Malta (78 kg)
1988 – gold medalist in Alfateh International Tournament (78 kg)

==== Career as a Coach ====
2008 – Judo National Coach and Team, Beijing Olympic Games
2004 – Judo National Coach and Team, Athens Olympic Games
1999 – National Coach Libyan Team (Pan Arab Games/Jordan)
1999 – National Coach Libyan Team All African Games South Africa.
1997–1998 – National Coach of the Malaysian team (two Judokas won bronze medals in SEA Games in Jakarta 1997)
1996–1998 – Head coach Selangor Judo Club (Malaysian overall Champions 1997)
1985–1992 – Coach and Athlete of Almadena Club (Libyan Champions)

=== Kidnapping ===
al-Alam was kidnapped on 15 July 2012 in central Tripoli. He was freed on 22 July 2012.

https://www1.udel.edu/udaily/2012/feb/icecp-libya-olympics-021012.html
