= Muammar Gaddafi =

Leader of Libya from 1969 to 2011

Brotherly Leader and Guide of the Revolution Colonel Muammar Gaddafi
- معمر القذافي
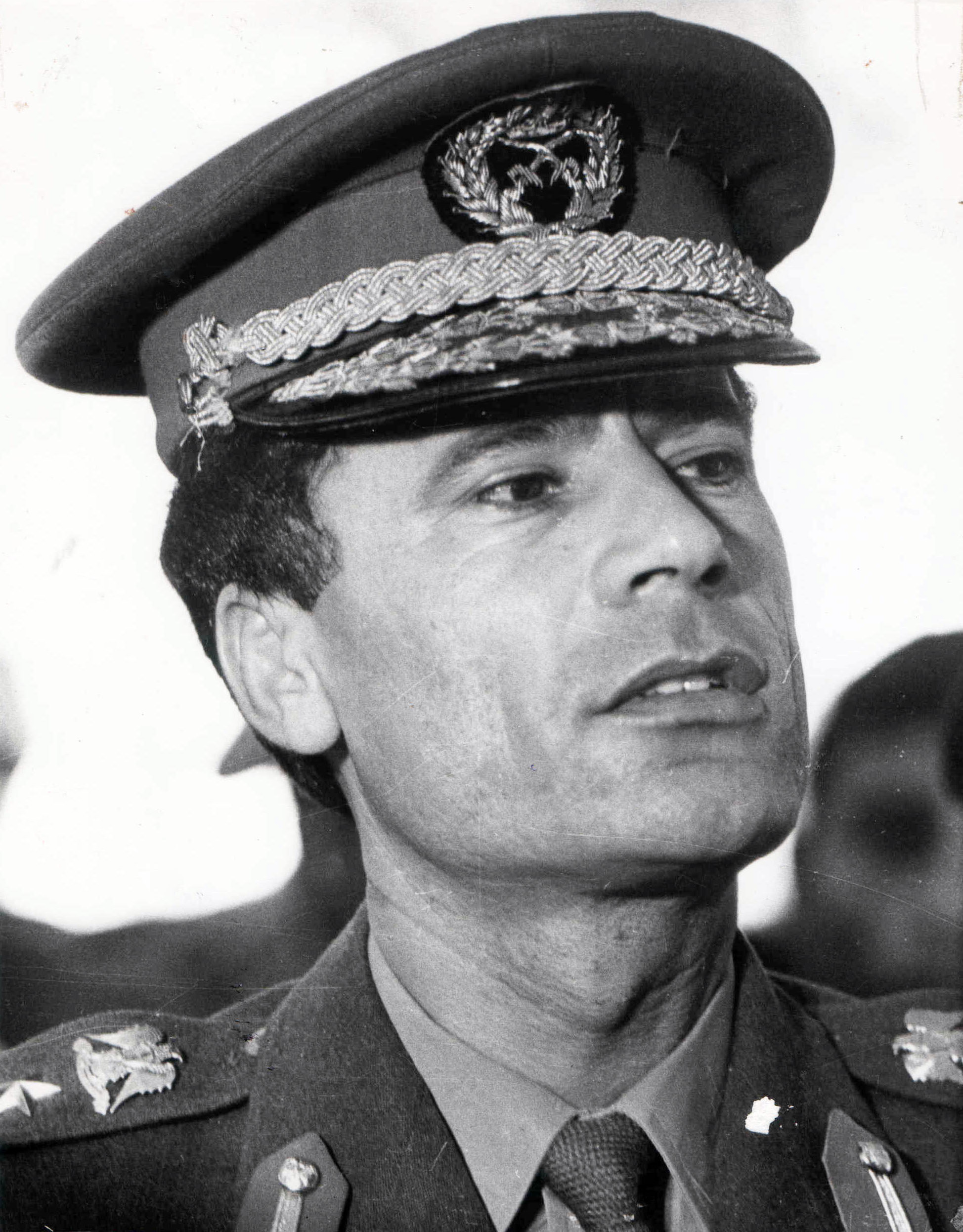
- Gaddafi in 1970

Brotherly Leader and Guide of the Revolution
- In office 2 March 1979 – 20 October 2011 (Note: For purposes of this article, 20 October 2011—the date on which Gaddafi died—is considered to be the date he left office. Other dates might have been chosen: On 15 July 2011, at a meeting in Istanbul, more than 30 governments, including the United States, withdrew recognition from Gaddafi's government and recognized the National Transitional Council (NTC) as the legitimate government of Libya.; On 23 August 2011, during the Battle of Tripoli, Gaddafi lost effective political and military control of Tripoli after his compound was captured by rebel forces.; On 25 August 2011, the Arab League proclaimed the anti-Gaddafi National Transitional Council to be "the legitimate representative of the Libyan state".; On 16 September 2011, the United Nations General Assembly sat the representatives of the National Transitional Council as Libya's official delegation.)
- Prime Minister: See list: Abdul Ati al-Obeidi; Jadallah Azzuz at-Talhi; Muhammad az-Zaruq Rajab; Jadallah Azzuz at-Talhi; Umar Mustafa Al Muntasir; Abuzed Omar Dorda; Abdul Majid al-Qa′ud; Muhammad Ahmad al-Mangoush; Imbarek Shamekh; Shukri Ghanem; Baghdadi Mahmudi
- Preceded by: Himself (as Secretary General of the GPC)
- Succeeded by: Mustafa Abdul Jalil (as Chairman of the NTC)

Secretary General of the General People's Congress
- In office 2 March 1977 – 2 March 1979
- Prime Minister: Abdul Ati al-Obeidi
- Preceded by: Himself (as Chairman of the RCC)
- Succeeded by: Abdul Ati al-Obeidi

Chairman of the Revolutionary Command Council of Libya
- In office 1 September 1969 – 2 March 1977
- Prime Minister: See list: Mahmud Suleiman Maghribi; Himself; Abdessalam Jalloud
- Preceded by: Idris I (as King of Libya)
- Succeeded by: Himself (as Secretary General of the GPC)

Prime Minister of Libya
- In office 16 January 1970 – 16 July 1972
- President: Himself (as Chairman of the RCC)
- Preceded by: Mahmud Suleiman Maghribi
- Succeeded by: Abdessalam Jalloud

7th Chairperson of the African Union
- In office 2 February 2009 – 31 January 2010
- Preceded by: Jakaya Kikwete
- Succeeded by: Bingu wa Mutharika

Personal details
- Born: Muammar Muhammad Abu Minyar al-Gaddafi c. 1942 Qasr Abu Hadi, Libya
- Died: 20 October 2011 (aged 68–69) Sirte, Libya
- Cause of death: Summary execution
- Resting place: Undisclosed location in the Libyan Desert
- Party: Arab Socialist Union; (1971–1977); Independent (1977–2011)
- Spouses: Fathia Nuri (m. 1969; div. 1970); Safia Farkash (m. 1970)
- Children: 10 Sons (8): Muhammad; Saif al-Islam (deceased); Al-Saadi; Mutassim (deceased); Hannibal; Saif al-Arab (deceased); Khamis (deceased, disputed); Milad (adopted); Daughters (2): Aisha; Hana (adopted)
- Relatives: Ahmed Gaddaf al-Dam (cousin)
- Education: University of Libya (dropped out)

Military service
- Allegiance: Kingdom of Libya (1961–1969); Libyan Arab Republic (1969–1977); Libyan Arab Jamahiriya (1977–2011)
- Branch/service: Libyan Army
- Years of service: 1961–2011
- Rank: Colonel
- Commands: Libyan Armed Forces
- Battles/wars: Yom Kippur War; Egyptian–Libyan War; Chadian–Libyan War; Toyota War; Uganda–Tanzania War; First Liberian Civil War; First Libyan Civil War; 2011 military intervention in Libya

Muammar Muhammad Abu Minyar al-Gaddafi (Note: English pronunciation: /ˈmoʊəmɑːr ɡəˈdæfi/ MOH-ə-mar gə-DAF-ee or /ɡəˈdɑːfi/ gə-DAH-fee; Arabic: مُعمّر محمد أبو منيار القذّافي, romanized: Muʿammar Muḥammad ʾAbū Minyār al-Qaḏḏāfī, Standard Arabic pronunciation: [muˈʕamːar alqaˈðːaːfiː], Libyan Arabic pronunciation: [ɡəˈðːaːfi] (eastern dialects) or [ɡəˈdːaːfi] (western dialects).) (Note: Due to the lack of standardization of transcribing written and regionally pronounced Arabic, Gaddafi's name has been romanized in various ways. A 1986 column by The Straight Dope lists 32 spellings known from the US Library of Congress, while ABC identified 112 possible spellings. A 2007 interview with Gaddafi's son Saif al-Islam Gaddafi confirms that Saif spelled his own name Qadhafi and the passport of Gaddafi's son Mohammed used the spelling Gathafi. According to Google Ngram the variant Qaddafi was slightly more widespread, followed by Qadhafi, Gaddafi and Gadhafi. Scientific romanizations of the name are Qaḏḏāfī (DIN, Wehr, ISO) or (rarely used) Qadhdhāfī (ALA-LC)) (c. 1942 – 20 October 2011) was a Libyan military officer, revolutionary, politician, and political theorist who ruled Libya from 1969 until his overthrow by Libyan rebel forces in 2011 during the First Libyan Civil War. He came to power through a bloodless military coup, first becoming Revolutionary Chairman of the Libyan Arab Republic from 1969 to 1977, Secretary General of the General People's Congress from 1977 to 1979, and then the Brotherly Leader of the Great Socialist People's Libyan Arab Jamahiriya from 1979 to 2011. Initially ideologically committed to Arab nationalism and Arab socialism, Gaddafi later ruled according to his own Third International Theory.

Gaddafi became an Arab nationalist while at school in Sabha, later enrolling in the Royal Military Academy, Benghazi. He founded a revolutionary group known as the Free Officers movement which deposed the Western-backed Senussi monarchy of Idris I in a 1969 coup. Gaddafi converted Libya into a republic governed by his Revolutionary Command Council. Ruling by decree, he deported Libya's Italian population and ejected its Western military bases.

He strengthened ties to Arab nationalist governments and unsuccessfully advocated pan-Arab political union. An Islamic modernist, he introduced Sharia law and promoted Islamic socialism. He nationalized the oil industry and used the increasing state revenues to bolster the military, fund foreign revolutionaries, and implement social programs emphasizing housebuilding, healthcare and education projects. In 1973, he initiated a "Popular Revolution" with the formation of Basic People's Congresses, presented as a system of direct democracy, but retained personal control over major decisions. He outlined his Third International Theory that year in The Green Book.

In 1977, Gaddafi transformed Libya into a new socialist state called a Jamahiriya ("state of the masses"). He officially adopted a symbolic role in governance but remained head of both the military and the Revolutionary Committees responsible for policing and suppressing dissent. During the 1970s and 1980s, Libya's unsuccessful border conflicts with Egypt and Chad, support for foreign militants and alleged responsibility for bombings of Pan Am Flight 103 and UTA Flight 772 left it increasingly isolated on the world stage.

A particularly hostile relationship developed with Israel, the United States and the United Kingdom, resulting in the 1986 U.S. bombing of Libya and United Nations–imposed economic sanctions. From 1999, Gaddafi shunned pan-Arabism, and encouraged pan-Africanism and rapprochement with Western nations; he was Chairperson of the African Union from 2009 to 2010. Amid the 2011 Arab Spring, protests against widespread corruption and unemployment broke out in eastern Libya. The situation descended into civil war, in which NATO intervened militarily on the side of the anti-Gaddafist National Transitional Council (NTC). Gaddafi's government was overthrown; he retreated to Sirte only to be captured, tortured and killed by NTC militants.

A highly divisive figure, Gaddafi dominated Libya's politics for four decades and was the subject of a pervasive cult of personality. He was decorated with various awards and praised for his anti-imperialist stance, support for Arab—and then African—unity, as well as for significant development to the country after the discovery of oil reserves. Conversely, many Libyans strongly opposed Gaddafi's social and economic reforms; he was accused of various human rights violations. He was condemned by many as a dictator whose authoritarian administration systematically violated human rights and financed terrorism in the region and abroad.

== Early life and career ==
Muammar Gaddafi was born near Qasr Abu Hadi, a rural area outside the town of Sirte in the deserts of Tripolitania, during the period of Italian colonial rule in Libya. His family came from a small, relatively uninfluential tribe called the Qadhadhfa, who claimed to be from the lineage of Musa al-Kazim. According to later claims, Gaddafi's paternal grandfather, Abdussalam Abu Minyar, was killed by the Italian Army during the Italian invasion of 1911. Subsequently, moving to nearby Sirte to attend elementary school, he progressed through six grades in four years. Growing up, Gaddafi witnessed significant events severely disturb the Arab world, including the 1948 Arab–Israeli War, the Egyptian Revolution of 1952, the Suez Crisis of 1956, and the short-lived existence of the United Arab Republic (UAR) between 1958 and 1961. In October 1961, he led a demonstration protesting against Syria's secession from the UAR and raised funds to send cables of support to Nasser. Twenty students were arrested as a result of the disorder. Gaddafi and his companions also broke windows in a local hotel that was accused of serving alcohol. To punish Gaddafi, the authorities expelled him and his family from Sabha.

Gaddafi moved to Misrata, there attending Misrata Secondary School. He graduated from the Benghazi Military College in 1965. In 1966, he went to the United Kingdom for further military training.

== Libyan Arab Republic ==
=== Coup d'état: 1969 ===
People of Libya! In response to your own will, fulfilling your most heartfelt wishes, answering your most incessant demands for change and regeneration, and your longing to strive towards these ends: listening to your incitement to rebel, your armed forces have undertaken the overthrow of the corrupt regime, the stench of which has sickened and horrified us all. At a single blow our gallant army has toppled these idols and has destroyed their images. By a single stroke it has lightened the long dark night in which the Turkish domination was followed first by Italian rule, then by this reactionary and decadent regime which was no more than a hotbed of extortion, faction, treachery and treason.

— Gaddafi's radio speech after seizing power, 1969

Idris' government was increasingly unpopular by the late 1960s, having exacerbated Libya's traditional regional and tribal divisions by centralizing the country's federal system to take advantage of the country's oil wealth. Corruption and entrenched patronage systems were widespread throughout the oil industry. Arab nationalism was increasingly popular, and protests flared up after Egypt's 1967 defeat in the Six-Day War with Israel; Idris' administration was seen as pro-Israeli due to its alliance with the West. Anti-Western riots broke out in Tripoli and Benghazi, while Libyan workers shut down oil terminals in solidarity with Egypt. By 1969, the US Central Intelligence Agency (CIA) was expecting segments of Libya's armed forces to launch a coup. Although claims have been made that they knew of Gaddafi's Free Officers Movement, they have since claimed ignorance, stating that they were instead monitoring the Black Boots revolutionary group of Abdul Aziz Shalhi, Idris' de facto chief of staff. Shalhi and his brother Omar were the sons of Idris' former chief advisor Ibrahim Shalhi, who had been murdered by Queen Fatima's nephew in 1954. After their father's assassination, they became the favorites of Idris.

In mid-1969, Idris spent the summer in Turkey and Greece amid widespread rumors of an abdication or a British-backed coup by the Shalhi brothers on 5 September. Gaddafi's Free Officers, recognizing this as their last chance to preempt the Shelhis in overthrowing the monarchy, initiated "Operation Jerusalem". If Gaddafi's Free Officers had not preempted the Shelhis, they would have almost certainly been defeated by the combined forces of Abdul Aziz Shelhi, the deputy commander of Libya's army, and the prominent families in Cyrenaica that supported the Shelhi family. On 1 September, Gaddafi's Free Officers occupied airports, police depots, radio stations, and government offices in Tripoli and Benghazi. Gaddafi took control of the Berka barracks in Benghazi, while Umar Muhayshi occupied Tripoli barracks and Jalloud seized the city's anti-aircraft batteries. Khweldi Hameidi took over the Tripoli radio station and arrested crown prince Sayyid Hasan ar-Rida al-Mahdi as-Sanussi, forcing him to relinquish his claim to the throne. They met no serious resistance and wielded little violence against the monarchists.

Once Gaddafi removed the government, he announced the foundation of the Libyan Arab Republic. Addressing the populace by radio, he proclaimed an end to the "reactionary and corrupt" regime, "the stench of which has sickened and horrified us all". Due to the coup's bloodless nature, it was initially labelled the "White Revolution", although was later renamed the "One September Revolution" after its date. Gaddafi insisted that the Free Officers' coup represented a revolution, marking the start of widespread change in the socio-economic and political nature of Libya. He proclaimed that the revolution meant "freedom, socialism, and unity", and soon implemented measures to achieve this.

=== Consolidating leadership: 1969–1973 ===
The 12-member central committee of the Free Officers proclaimed themselves the Revolutionary Command Council (RCC), the government of the new republic. Gaddafi became chairman, and therefore de facto head of state, also appointing himself colonel and becoming commander-in-chief of the armed forces. Jalloud became Prime Minister, while a civilian Council of Ministers headed by Sulaiman Maghribi was founded to implement RCC policy. Libya's administrative capital was moved from al-Beida to Tripoli.

The flag of republican Libya used by Gaddafi's government from 1969 to 1972

Although theoretically a consensus-building collegial body, Gaddafi dominated the RCC. Some of the others attempted to constrain what they saw as his excesses. Gaddafi remained the government's public face, with the identities of the other RCC members only publicly revealed on 10 January 1970. All were young men from lower-class backgrounds without university degrees, which distinguished them from the wealthy, educated conservatives who previously governed the country.

The coup completed, the RCC proceeded with consolidating power and modernizing the country. They purged monarchists and members of Idris' Senussi clan from Libya's political world and armed forces; Gaddafi believed them opposed to the will of the Libyan people. People's Courts were founded to try various monarchist politicians and journalists, many of whom were imprisoned, although none executed. Idris was sentenced to execution in absentia. Three months after Gaddafi came to power, the army minister and interior minister, both from the eastern Barqa region, tried to overthrow him in a failed coup. In 1970, Idris' great-nephew Ahmed al-Senussi attempted another coup against Gaddafi; the monarchist plot was foiled in August and Ahmed was sentenced to death (commuted in 1988 and pardoned by Gaddafi in 2001).

In May 1970, the Revolutionary Intellectuals Seminar was held to bring intellectuals in line with the revolution, while that year's Legislative Review and Amendment introduced sharia into the legal system. Ruling by decree, the RCC maintained the monarchy's ban on political parties, banned trade unions, and in 1972 outlawed workers' strikes and suspended newspapers. In September 1971, Gaddafi resigned, claiming dissatisfaction with the pace of reform, but returned to his position within a month. In July 1972, amid widespread speculation that Gaddafi had been ousted or jailed by his political opponents, a new 18-man cabinet was formed with only two, Jalloud and Abdel Moneim al-Houni, being military men; the rest were civilian technocrats per Gaddafi's insistence. In February 1973, Gaddafi resigned again, once more returning the next month.

==== Economic and social reform ====
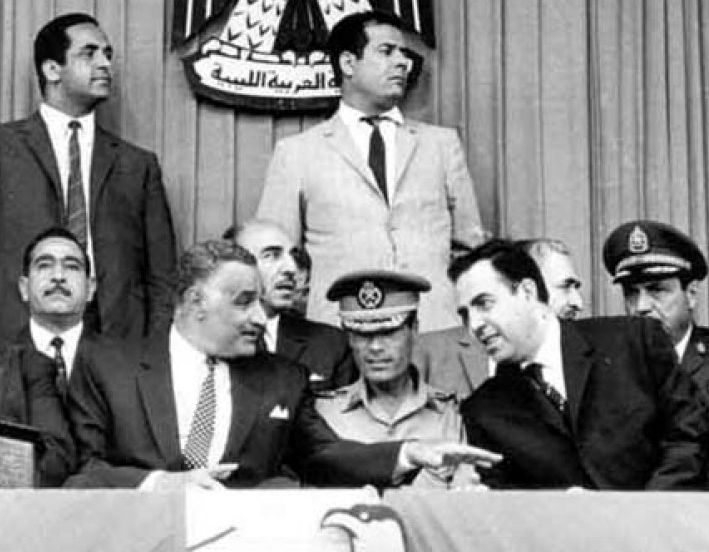
Gaddafi at an Arab summit in Libya in 1969, shortly after the September Revolution that toppled King Idris I. Gaddafi sits in military uniform in the middle, surrounded by Egyptian President Gamal Abdel Nasser (left) and Syrian President Nureddin al-Atassi (right).

The RCC's early economic policy has been characterized as being state capitalist in orientation. Many initiatives were established to aid entrepreneurs and develop a Libyan bourgeoisie. Seeking to expand cultivatable acreage, in September 1969 the government launched a "Green Revolution" to increase agricultural productivity and lessen Libyan reliance on imported food. They hoped to make Libya self-sufficient in food production. All land expropriated from Italian settlers or unused was repossessed and redistributed. Irrigation systems were established along the northern coastline and various inland oases. Production costs often surpassed produce value, keeping production in deficit and relying on state subsidies.

With crude oil as the country's primary export, Gaddafi sought to improve Libya's oil sector. In October 1969, he proclaimed the current trade terms unfair, benefiting foreign corporations more than the Libyan state, and threatened to decrease production. In December, Jalloud successfully increased the price of Libyan oil. In 1970, other OPEC states followed suit, leading to a global increase in the price of crude oil. The RCC followed with the Tripoli Agreement of 1971, in which they secured income tax, back-payments and better pricing from the oil corporations; these measures brought Libya an estimated $1 billion in additional revenues in its first year.

Increasing state control over the oil sector, the RCC began a program of nationalization, starting with the expropriation of British Petroleum's share of the British Petroleum-N.B. Hunt Sahir Field in December 1971. In September 1973, all foreign oil producers in Libya saw 51 per cent of their operation nationalized. Among the companies that were partially nationalized was Armand Hammer's Occidental Petroleum. For Gaddafi, this was an essential step towards socialism. It proved an economic success; while gross domestic product had been $3.8 billion in 1969, it had risen to $13.7 billion in 1974, and $24.5 billion in 1979. In turn, Libyan standards of life greatly improved over the first decade of Gaddafi's administration, and by 1979 the average per-capita income was at $8,170, up from $40 in 1951; above that of many industrialized countries like Italy and the UK. In 1969, the government ordered all foreign owned banks to close down or convert to joint-stock operations.

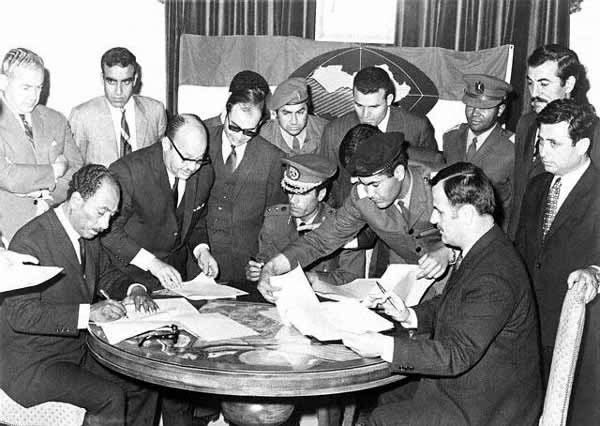
In 1971, Egypt's Anwar Sadat, Libya's Gaddafi and Syria's Hafez al-Assad signed an agreement to form a federal Union of Arab Republics. The agreement never materialized into a federal union between the three Arab states.

The RCC implemented social reform measures, adopting sharia as a basis. Consumption of alcohol was prohibited, night clubs and Christian churches were shut down, traditional Libyan dress was encouraged, and Arabic was declared the only language permitted in official communications and on road signs. The RCC doubled the minimum wage, introduced statutory price controls, and implemented compulsory rent reductions of between 30 and 40 per cent. Gaddafi also wanted to combat the strict social restrictions imposed on women by the previous regime, establishing the Revolutionary Women's Formation to encourage reform. In 1970, a law was introduced affirming equality of the sexes and wage parity. In 1971, Gaddafi sponsored the creation of a Libyan General Women's Federation. In 1972, a law was passed criminalizing the marriage of any females under the age of sixteen and making women's consent a prerequisite for marriage. Gaddafi's regime created a wide range of educational and employment opportunities for women, although these primarily benefited a minority in the urban middle-classes.

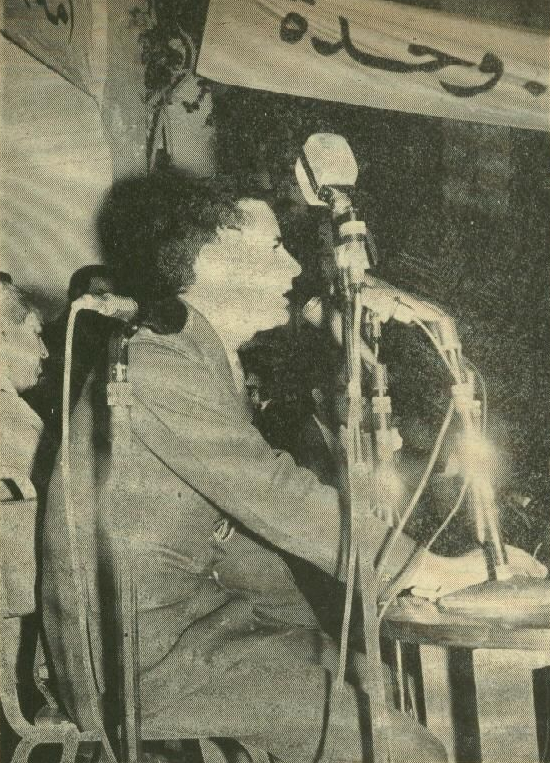
Gaddafi addresses students, 1970

Oil money funded social welfare programs, leading to housebuilding projects and improved healthcare and education. House building became a major social priority to eliminate homelessness and replace the shanty towns created by Libya's growing urbanization. The health sector was also expanded; by 1978, Libya had 50 per cent more hospitals than it had in 1968, while the number of doctors had increased from 700 to over 3,000 in that decade. Malaria was eradicated, and trachoma and tuberculosis greatly curtailed. Compulsory education was expanded from 6 to 9 years, while adult literacy programs and free university education were introduced. Beida University was founded, while Tripoli University and Benghazi University were expanded. In doing so, the government helped integrate the poor into the education system. Through these measures, the RCC greatly expanded the public sector, providing employment for thousands. These early social programs proved popular within Libya, partly due to Gaddafi's personal charisma, youth, underdog status as a Bedouin, and his rhetoric emphasizing himself as a successor to the anti-Italian fighter Omar al-Mukhtar.

To combat the country's strong regional and tribal divisions, the RCC promoted the idea of a unified pan-Libyan identity. They discredited tribal leaders as agents of the old regime, and in August 1971 a Sabha military court tried many of them for counter-revolutionary activity. Long-standing administrative boundaries were re-drawn, crossing tribal boundaries, while pro-revolutionary modernizers replaced traditional leaders, yet the communities they served often rejected them. Realizing the failures of the modernizers, Gaddafi created the Arab Socialist Union (ASU) in June 1971, a mass mobilization vanguard party with him as president. The ASU recognized the RCC as its "Supreme Leading Authority", and was designed to further revolutionary enthusiasm. It remained heavily bureaucratic and failed to mobilize mass support as Gaddafi had envisioned.

==== Foreign relations ====
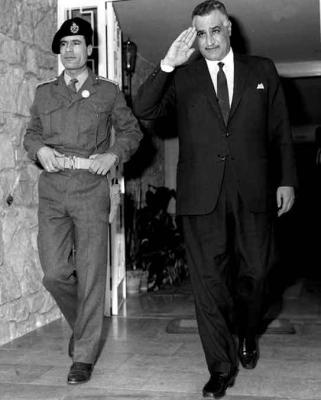
Gaddafi (left) with Egyptian President Nasser in 1969. Nasser privately described Gaddafi as "a nice boy, but terribly naïve".

The influence of Nasser's Arab nationalism over the RCC was immediately apparent. The administration was instantly recognized by the neighbouring Arab nationalist regimes in Egypt, Syria, Iraq, and Sudan, with Egypt sending experts to aid the inexperienced RCC. Gaddafi propounded pan-Arab ideas, proclaiming the need for a single Arab state stretching across North Africa and the Middle East. In December 1969, Libya signed the Tripoli Charter alongside Egypt and Sudan. This established the Arab Revolutionary Front, a pan-national union designed as a first step towards the eventual political unification of the three nations. In 1970 Syria declared its intention to join.

Nasser died unexpectedly in September 1970, with Gaddafi playing a prominent role at his funeral. Nasser was succeeded by Anwar Sadat, who replaced the idea of a unified state with a political federation, implemented in April 1971; in doing so, Egypt, Syria, and Sudan received large grants of Libyan oil money. In July 1971, Gaddafi sided with Sadat against the Soviet Union in the 1971 Sudanese coup d'état and dispatched Libyan fighter jets to force down a British Overseas Airways Corporation jetliner carrying the leading coup plotters, Farouk Osman Hamadallah and Babikir al-Nour. They were extradited back to Khartoum, where they were promptly executed by Sudanese leader Jaafar Nimeiry. In February 1972, Gaddafi and Sadat signed an unofficial charter of merger, but it was never implemented because relations broke down the next year. Sadat became increasingly wary of Libya's radical direction, and the September 1973 deadline for implementing the Federation passed with no action taken.

After the 1969 coup, representatives of the Four Powers—France, the UK, the US, and the Soviet Union—were called to meet RCC representatives. The UK and the US quickly extended diplomatic recognition, hoping to secure their military bases and fearing further instability. Hoping to ingratiate themselves with Gaddafi, in 1970 the US informed him of at least one planned counter-coup. Such attempts to form a working relationship with the RCC failed; Gaddafi was determined to reassert national sovereignty and expunge what he described as foreign colonial and imperialist influences. His administration insisted that the US and the UK remove their military bases from Libya. The British left in March and the Americans in June 1970.

Moving to reduce Italian influence, in October 1970 all Italian-owned assets were expropriated, and the 12,000-strong Italian community was expelled alongside the smaller community of Libyan Jews. The day became a national holiday known as "Vengeance Day". Italy complained that this was in contravention of the 1956 Italo-Libyan Treaty, although no UN sanctions came. Aiming to reduce NATO power in the Mediterranean, in 1971 Libya requested that Malta cease allowing NATO to use its land for a military base, in turn offering Malta foreign aid. Compromising, Malta's government continued allowing NATO to use the island, but only on the condition that NATO would not use it for attacks on Arab territory. Over the coming decade, Libya developed stronger political and economic links with Dom Mintoff's Maltese administration, and under Libya's urging Malta did not renew the UK's airbases in 1980. Orchestrating a military build-up, the RCC began purchasing weapons from France and the Soviet Union. The commercial relationship with the latter led to an increasingly strained relationship with the US, which was then engaged in the Cold War with the Soviets.

A 1973 anti-Gaddafist British newsreel including an interview with Gaddafi about his support for foreign militants

Gaddafi was especially critical of the US due to its support of Israel and sided with the Palestinians in the Israeli–Palestinian conflict, viewing the creation of Israel as a Western colonial occupation forced upon the Arab world. He believed Palestinian violence against Israeli and Western targets the justified response of an oppressed people fighting against colonization. Calling on Arab states to wage "continuous war" against Israel, in 1970 he initiated a Jihad Fund to finance anti-Israeli militants. In June 1972 Gaddafi created the First Nasserite Volunteers Centre to train anti-Israeli guerrillas.

Like Nasser, Gaddafi favoured the Palestinian leader Yasser Arafat and his group, Fatah, over more militant and Marxist Palestinian groups. As the years progressed however, Gaddafi's relationship with Arafat became strained, with Gaddafi considering him too moderate and calling for more violent action. Instead, he supported militias like the Popular Front for the Liberation of Palestine, Popular Front for the Liberation of Palestine – General Command, the Democratic Front for the Liberation of Palestine, As-Sa'iqa, the Palestinian Popular Struggle Front, and the Abu Nidal Organization. He funded the Black September Organization which perpetrated the 1972 Munich massacre of Israeli athletes in West Germany and flew the militants' bodies to Libya for a hero's funeral.

Gaddafi financially supported other militant groups across the world, including the Black Panther Party, the Nation of Islam, the Almighty Black P. Stone Nation, the Tupamaros, the 19th of April Movement and the Sandinista National Liberation Front in Nicaragua, the ANC in South Africa, the Provisional Irish Republican Army, ETA, Action Directe, the Red Brigades, and the Red Army Faction in Europe, and the Armenian Secret Army, the Japanese Red Army, the Free Aceh Movement, and the Moro National Liberation Front in the Philippines. Gaddafi was indiscriminate in the causes he funded, sometimes switching sides in a conflict, as in the Eritrean War of Independence. Throughout the 1970s these groups received financial support from Libya, which became a leader in the Third World's struggle against colonialism and neocolonialism. Though many of these groups were labelled "terrorists" by critics, Gaddafi rejected this characterization, instead considering them revolutionaries engaged in liberation struggles.

=== The "Popular Revolution": 1973–1977 ===
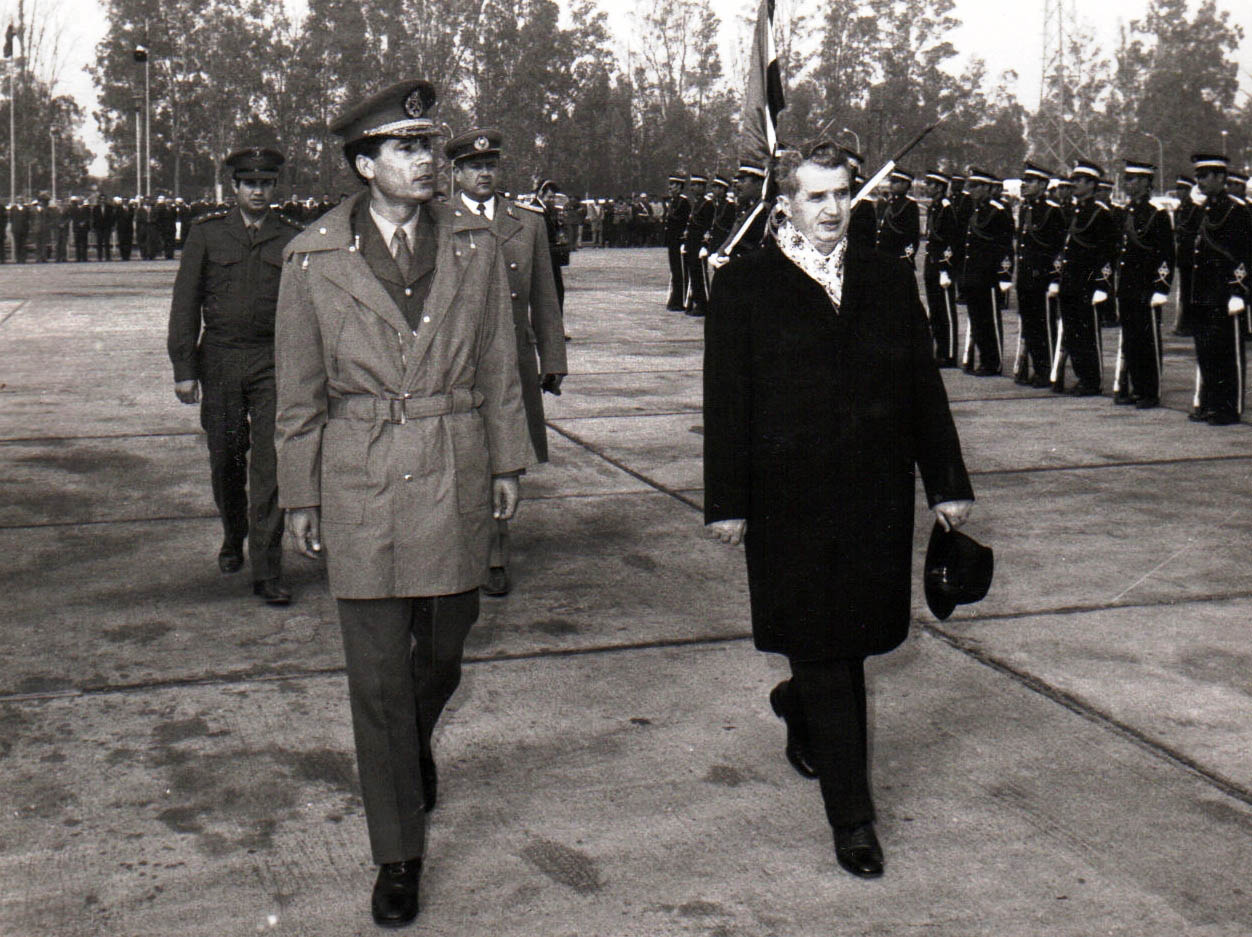
Gaddafi with Romanian President Nicolae Ceaușescu in Bucharest, 1974

On 16 April 1973, Gaddafi proclaimed the start of a "Popular Revolution" in a speech at Zuwarah. He initiated this with a five-point plan, the first point of which dissolved all existing laws, to be replaced by revolutionary enactments. The second point proclaimed that all opponents of the revolution had to be removed, while the third initiated an administrative revolution that Gaddafi proclaimed would remove all traces of bureaucracy and the bourgeoisie. The fourth point announced that the population must form People's Committees and be armed to defend the revolution, while the fifth proclaimed the beginning of the Cultural Revolution in Libya, to expunge the country of "poisonous" foreign influences. He began to lecture on this new phase of the revolution in Libya, Egypt, and France. As a process, it had many similarities with the Cultural Revolution implemented in China.

As part of this Popular Revolution, Gaddafi invited Libya's people to found General People's Committees as conduits for raising political consciousness. Although offering little guidance for how to set up these councils, Gaddafi claimed that they would offer a form of direct political participation that was more democratic than a traditional party-based representative system. He hoped that the councils would mobilize the people behind the RCC, erode the power of the traditional leaders and the bureaucracy, and allow for a new legal system chosen by the people. Many such committees were established in schools and colleges, where they were responsible for vetting staff, courses, and textbooks to determine if they were compatible with the country's revolutionary ideology.

The People's Committees led to a high percentage of public involvement in decision making, within the limits permitted by the RCC, but exacerbated tribal divisions and tensions. They also served as a surveillance system, aiding the security services in locating individuals with views critical of the RCC, leading to the arrest of Ba'athists, Marxists, and Islamists. Operating in a pyramid structure, the base form of these Committees were local working groups, who sent elected representatives to the district level, and from there to the national level, divided between the General People's Congress and the General People's Committee. Above these remained Gaddafi and the RCC, who remained responsible for all major decisions. In crossing regional and tribal identities, the committee system aided national integration and centralization and tightened Gaddafi's control over the state and administrative apparatus.

==== Third International Theory and The Green Book ====
In June 1973, Gaddafi created a political ideology as a basis for the Popular Revolution: Third International Theory. This approach regarded both the US and the Soviet Union as imperialist and thus rejected Western capitalism as well as Marxist–Leninist atheism. In this respect, it was similar to the Three Worlds Theory developed by China's political leader Mao Zedong. As part of this theory, Gaddafi praised nationalism as a progressive force and advocated the creation of a pan-Arab state which would lead the Islamic and Third Worlds against imperialism. Gaddafi saw Islam as having a key role in this ideology, calling for an Islamic revival that returned to the origins of the Qur'an, rejecting scholarly interpretations and the Hadith; in doing so, he angered many Libyan clerics. During 1973 and 1974, his government deepened the legal reliance on sharia, for instance by introducing flogging as punishment for those convicted of adultery or homosexual activity.

Gaddafi summarized Third International Theory in three short volumes published between 1975 and 1979, collectively known as The Green Book. Volume one was devoted to the issue of democracy, outlining the flaws of representative systems in favour of direct, participatory GPCs. The second dealt with Gaddafi's beliefs regarding socialism, while the third explored social issues regarding the family and the tribe. While the first two volumes advocated radical reform, the third adopted a socially conservative stance, proclaiming that while men and women were equal, they were biologically designed for different roles in life. During the years that followed, Gaddafists adopted quotes from The Green Book, such as "Representation is Fraud", as slogans. Meanwhile, in September 1975, Gaddafi implemented further measures to increase popular mobilization, introducing objectives to improve the relationship between the Councils and the ASU.

In 1975, Gaddafi's government declared a state monopoly on foreign trade. Its increasingly radical reforms, coupled with the large amount of oil revenue being spent on foreign causes, generated discontent in Libya, particularly among the country's merchant class. In 1974, Libya saw its first civilian attack on Gaddafi's government when a Benghazi army building was bombed. Much of the opposition centred around RCC member Umar Muhayshi. With fellow RCC members Bashir Saghir al-Hawaadi and Awad Ali Hamza, he began plotting a coup against Gaddafi. In 1975, their plot was exposed and Muhayshi fled to Tunisia, eventually receiving asylum from Sadat's Egypt. Hawaadi, Hamza, and Omar El-Hariri were arrested. Most of the other conspirators were executed in March 1976. Another RCC member, foreign minister Abdul-Munim al-Huni, also fled to Egypt. In the aftermath, only five RCC members remained: Gaddafi, Jalloud, Abu-Bakr Yunis Jabr, Mustafa Kharubi, and Kweldi al-Hamidi. Thus, power was further concentrated in Gaddafi's hands. This ultimately led to the RCC's official abolition in March 1977.

In September 1975, Gaddafi purged the army, arresting around 200 senior officers, and in October he founded the clandestine Office for the Security of the Revolution. In April 1976, he called upon his supporters in universities to establish "revolutionary student councils" and drive out "reactionary elements". During that year, anti-Gaddafist student demonstrations broke out at the universities of Tripoli and Benghazi, resulting in clashes with both Gaddafist students and police. The RCC responded with mass arrests and introduced compulsory national service for young people. In January 1977, two dissenting students and a number of army officers were publicly hanged; Amnesty International condemned it as the first time in Gaddafist Libya that dissenters had been executed for purely political crimes. Dissent also arose from conservative clerics and the Muslim Brotherhood, who accused Gaddafi of moving towards Marxism and criticized his abolition of private property as being against the Islamic sunnah; these forces were then persecuted as anti-revolutionary, while all privately owned Islamic colleges and universities were shut down.

==== Foreign relations ====
After Anwar Sadat's ascension to the Egyptian presidency, Libya's relations with Egypt deteriorated. Over the coming years, the two slipped into a state of cold war. Sadat was perturbed by Gaddafi's unpredictability and insistence that Egypt required a cultural revolution akin to that being carried out in Libya. In February 1973, Israeli forces shot down Libyan Arab Airlines Flight 114, which had strayed from Egyptian airspace into Israeli-held territory during a sandstorm. Gaddafi's foreign minister Salah Busir was on board and allegedly targeted by Israel in retaliation for the Munich massacre. Gaddafi was infuriated that Egypt had not done more to prevent the incident, and in retaliation planned to destroy the Queen Elizabeth 2, a British ship chartered by American Jews to sail to Haifa for Israel's 25th anniversary. Gaddafi ordered an Egyptian submarine to target the ship, but Sadat cancelled the order, fearing a military escalation.

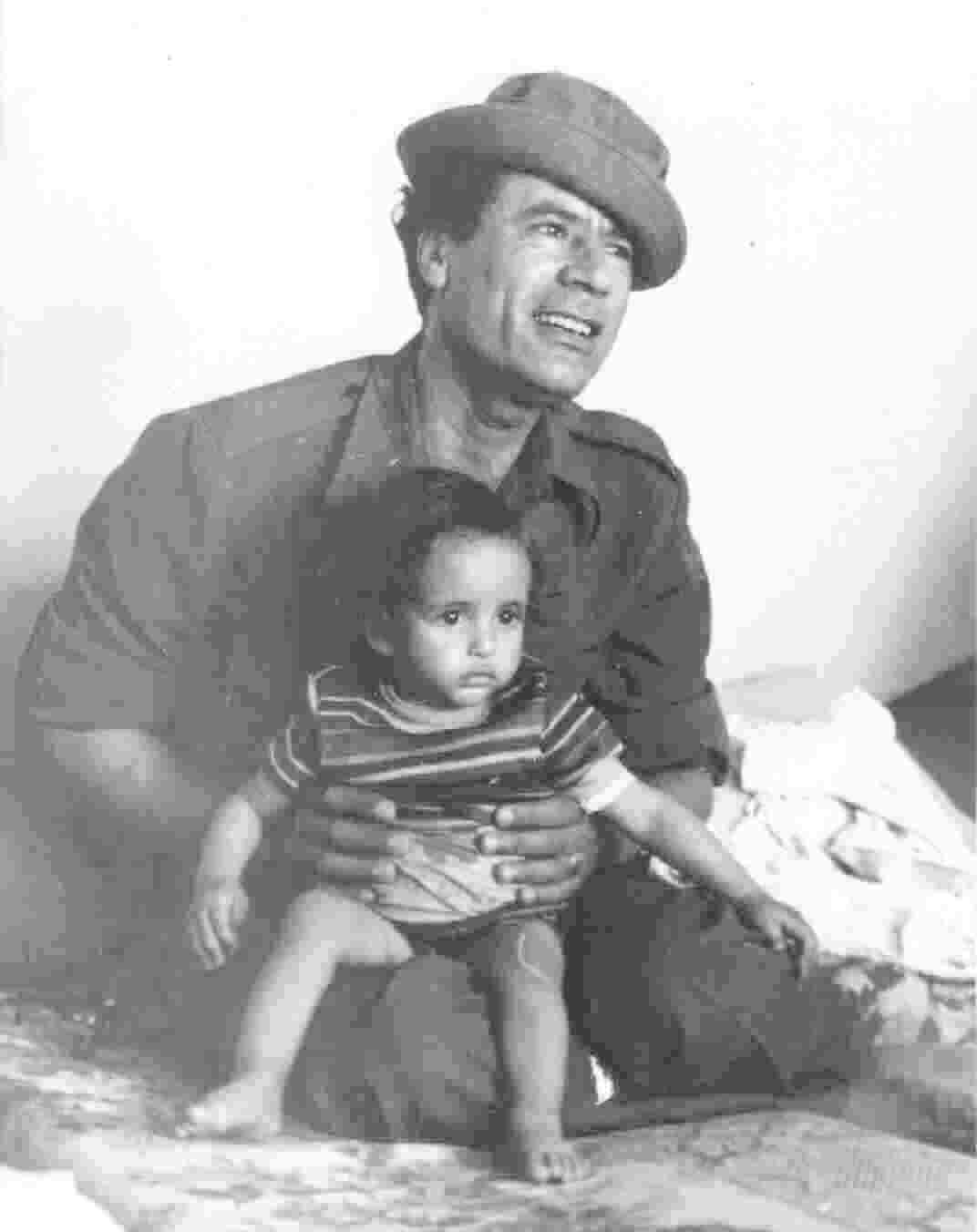
Gaddafi in 1976 with a child on his lap

Gaddafi was later infuriated when Egypt and Syria planned the Yom Kippur War against Israel without consulting him and was angered when Egypt conceded to peace talks rather than continuing the war. Gaddafi became openly hostile to Egypt's leader, calling for Sadat's overthrow. When Sudanese President Gaafar Nimeiry took Sadat's side, Gaddafi also spoke out against him, encouraging the Sudan People's Liberation Army's attempt to overthrow Nimeiry. In 1974, Gaddafi released Abdul-Aziz Shennib, a commander under King Idris, from prison and appointed him Libyan ambassador to Jordan. Shennib had attended the Royal Military Academy Sandhurst with King Hussein of Jordan and was tasked by Gaddafi with Hussein's assassination. Shennib instead informed Hussein of the plot and defected to Jordan. Relations with Syria also soured over the events in the Lebanese Civil War. Initially, both Libya and Syria had contributed troops to the Arab League's peacekeeping force, although after the Syrian army attacked the Lebanese National Movement, Gaddafi openly accused Syrian President Hafez al-Assad of "national treason"; he was the only Arab leader to criticize Syria's actions. In late 1972 and early 1973, Libya invaded Chad to annex the uranium-rich Aouzou Strip.

Intent on propagating Islam, in 1973 Gaddafi founded the Islamic Call Society, which had opened 132 centres across Africa within a decade. In 1973 he converted Gabonese President Omar Bongo, an action which he repeated three years later with Jean-Bédel Bokassa, president of the Central African Republic. Between 1973 and 1979, Libya provided $500 million in aid to African countries, namely to Zaire and Uganda, and founded joint-venture companies throughout the countries to aid trade and development. Gaddafi was also keen on reducing Israeli influence within Africa, using financial incentives to successfully convince eight African states to break off diplomatic relations with Israel in 1973.

A strong relationship was also established between Gaddafi's Libya and Prime Minister Zulfikar Ali Bhutto's Pakistani government, with the two countries exchanging nuclear research and military assistance. In recognition of Gaddafi's support of Pakistan's right to pursue nuclear weapons and financial support for the "Islamic bomb", Lahore Stadium was renamed Gaddafi Stadium. Gaddafi also provided support for Pakistan in the Bangladesh Liberation War; he reportedly deployed F-5s to Sargodha AFB and penned a strongly worded letter to Indian Prime Minister Indira Gandhi accusing her of aggression against Pakistan. Gaddafi's strong relationship with Pakistan ended after Bhutto was deposed by Muhammad Zia-ul-Haq in 1977 as Zia distrusted Gaddafi and rejected further Libyan financing for the Pakistani nuclear program in favor of Saudi financing.

Gaddafi sought to develop closer links in the Maghreb; in January 1974 Libya and Tunisia announced a political union, the Arab Islamic Republic. Although advocated by Gaddafi and Tunisian President Habib Bourguiba, the move was deeply unpopular in Tunisia, and it was soon abandoned. Retaliating, Gaddafi sponsored anti-government militants in Tunisia into the 1980s. Turning his attention to Algeria, in 1975 Libya signed, in Hassi Messaoud, a defensive alliance allegedly to counter alleged "Moroccan expansionism", also funding the Polisario Front of Western Sahara in its independence struggle against Morocco. Seeking to diversify Libya's economy, Gaddafi's government began purchasing shares in major European corporations like Fiat as well as buying real estate in Malta and Italy, which would become a valuable source of income during the 1980s oil slump.

== Great Socialist People's Libyan Arab Jamahiriya ==
=== Foundation: 1977 ===
On 2 March 1977, the General People's Congress adopted the "Declaration on the Establishment of the Authority of the People" at Gaddafi's behest. Dissolving the Libyan Arab Republic, it was replaced by the Great Socialist People's Libyan Arab Jamahiriya (Arabic: الجماهيرية العربية الليبية الشعبية الاشتراكية, al-Jamāhīrīyah al-‘Arabīyah al-Lībīyah ash-Sha‘bīyah al-Ishtirākīyah), a "state of the masses" conceptualized by Gaddafi. A new, all-green banner was adopted as the country's flag. Officially, the Jamahiriya was a direct democracy in which the people ruled themselves through the 187 Basic People's Congresses (BPCs), where all adult Libyans participated and voted on national decisions. These then sent members to the annual General People's Congress, which was broadcast live on television. In principle, the People's Congresses were Libya's highest authority, with major decisions proposed by government officials or with Gaddafi himself requiring the consent of the People's Congresses. Gaddafi became General Secretary of the GPC, although he stepped down from this position in early 1979 and appointed himself "Leader of the Revolution".

Flag of Libya (1977–2011)

Although all political control was officially vested in the People's Congresses, in reality Libya's existing political leadership continued to exercise varying degrees of power and influence. Debate remained limited, and major decisions regarding the economy and defence were avoided or dealt with cursorily; the GPC largely remained "a rubber stamp" for Gaddafi's policies. On rare occasions, the GPC opposed Gaddafi's suggestions, sometimes successfully; notably, when Gaddafi called on primary schools to be abolished, believing that homeschooling was healthier for children, the GPC rejected the idea. In other instances, Gaddafi pushed through laws without the GPC's support, such as when he desired to allow women into the armed forces. At other times, he ordered snap elections when it appeared that the GPC would enact laws he opposed. Gaddafi proclaimed that the People's Congresses provided for Libya's every political need, rendering other political organizations unnecessary; all non-authorized groups, including political parties, professional associations, independent trade unions, and women's groups, were banned. Despite these restrictions, Ronald Bruce St. John noted that the Jamahiriya system still "introduced a level of representation and participation hitherto unknown in Libya".

With preceding legal institutions abolished, Gaddafi envisioned the Jamahiriya as following the Qur'an for legal guidance, adopting sharia law; he proclaimed "man-made" laws unnatural and dictatorial, only permitting Allah's law. Within a year he was backtracking, announcing that sharia was inappropriate for the Jamahiriya because it guaranteed the protection of private property, contravening The Green Book's socialism. His emphasis on placing his own work on a par with the Qur'an led conservative clerics to accuse him of shirk, furthering their opposition to his regime. In July 1977, a border war broke out with Egypt, in which the Egyptians defeated Libya despite their technological inferiority. The conflict lasted one week before both sides agreed to sign a peace treaty that was brokered by several Arab states. Both Egypt and Sudan had aligned themselves with the US, and this pushed Libya into a strategic, although not political, alignment with the Soviet Union. In recognition of the growing commercial relationship between Libya and the Soviets, Gaddafi was invited to visit Moscow in December 1976; there, he entered talks with Leonid Brezhnev. In August 1977, he visited Yugoslavia, where he met its leader Josip Broz Tito, with whom he had a much warmer relationship. He also enjoyed a warm relationship with Romanian leader Nicolae Ceaușescu. According to Romanian spy chief Ion Mihai Pacepa, Gaddafi once exclaimed to Ceaușescu, "My brother! You are my brother for the rest of my life!" After Pacepa defected to the US in July 1978, Gaddafi and Yasser Arafat contributed $1 million each to Ceaușescu's $4 million bounty on Pacepa.

=== Revolutionary Committees and furthering socialism: 1978–1980 ===
If socialism is defined as a redistribution of wealth and resources, a socialist revolution clearly occurred in Libya after 1969 and most especially in the second half of the 1970s. The management of the economy was increasingly socialist in intent and effect with wealth in housing, capital and land significantly redistributed or in the process of redistribution. Private enterprise was virtually eliminated, largely replaced by a centrally controlled economy.

— Libyan Studies scholar Ronald Bruce St. John

In December 1978, Gaddafi stepped down as Secretary-General of the GPC, announcing his new focus on revolutionary rather than government activities; this was part of his new emphasis on separating the apparatus of the revolution from government. Although no longer in a formal government post, he adopted the title of "Leader of the Revolution" and continued as commander-in-chief of the armed forces. Historian Dirk Vandewalle stated that despite the Jamahariya's claims to being a direct democracy, Libya remained "an exclusionary political system whose decision-making process" was "restricted to a small cadre of advisers and confidantes" surrounding Gaddafi.

Libya started constructing a welfare state. In March 1978, the government issued guidelines for housing redistribution, attempting to ensure every adult owned their own home. Most families were banned from owning more than one house, while former rental properties were expropriated by the state and sold to the tenants at a heavily subsidized price. In September, Gaddafi called for the People's Committees to eliminate the "bureaucracy of the public sector" and the "dictatorship of the private sector"; the People's Committees took control of several hundred companies, converting them into worker cooperatives run by elected representatives.

In March 1979, the GPC announced the separation of government and revolution, the latter being represented by new Revolutionary Committees, who operated with the People's Committees in schools, universities, unions, the police force, and the military. Dominated by revolutionary zealots, mostly youths, the Revolutionary Committees were based in Tripoli and met with Gaddafi annually. Membership was drawn from within the BPCs. The revolutionary committee system became "a key—if not the main—mechanism through which [Gaddafi] exercises political control in Libya". Publishing a weekly magazine, The Green March, starting October 1980 they took control of the press. Responsible for perpetuating the revolution, they performed ideological surveillance, adopting a significant security role, making arrests and putting people on trial according to the "law of the revolution". With no legal or safeguards, the administration of revolutionary justice was largely arbitrary and resulted in widespread abuse and the suppression of civil liberties: the "Green Terror".

In 1979, the committees began the redistribution of land in the Jefara plain, continuing through 1981. In May 1980, measures to redistribute and equalize wealth were implemented; anyone with over 1000 dinar in their bank account saw that extra money expropriated. The next year, the GPC announced that the government would take control of all import, export and distribution functions, with state supermarkets replacing privately owned businesses; this led to a decline in the availability of consumer goods and the development of a thriving black market. Gaddafi was frustrated by the slow pace of social reform on women's issues, and in 1979 launched a Revolutionary Women's Formation, to replace the more gradualist Libyan General Women's Federation. In 1978 he had established a Women's Military Academy in Tripoli, encouraging all women to enlist for training. The measure was hugely controversial and voted down by the GPC in February 1983. Gaddafi remained adamant, and when it was again voted down by the GPC in March 1984, he refused to abide by the decision, declaring that "he who opposes the training and emancipation of women is an agent of imperialism, whether he likes it or not."

The Jamahiriya's radical direction earned the government many enemies. Most internal opposition came from Islamic fundamentalists, inspired by the events of the 1979 Iranian Revolution. In February 1978, Gaddafi discovered that his head of military intelligence was plotting to kill him and increasingly entrusted security to his Qadhadfa tribe. Many who had seen their wealth confiscated turned against the administration, and Western-funded opposition groups were founded by exiles. Most prominent was the National Front for the Salvation of Libya (NFSL), which orchestrated militant attacks against Libya's government. Another, al-Borkan, began killing Libyan diplomats abroad. Following Gaddafi's command to kill these "stray dogs", the Revolutionary Committees set up overseas branches to suppress counter-revolutionary activity, assassinating dissidents. Although Syria and Israel also employed hit squads, Gaddafi was unusual in publicly bragging about his use of them; in April 1980, he ordered all dissidents to return home by 10 June or be "liquidated wherever you are". Within a three months period in 1980, at least ten Libyan dissidents were murdered in Europe, including ex-diplomats, ex-army officers, businessmen, journalists, and student activists in disparate locations such as London, Greece and Austria. At least eleven more were assassinated in 1981. In 1984, Gaddafi was tricked by Egyptian President Hosni Mubarak into announcing the assassination of former Libyan Prime Minister Abdul Hamid al-Bakkoush in Cairo; Bakkhoush not only turned up alive but held a press conference with Egypt's Interior Minister. In 1979, Gaddafi created the Islamic Legion, through which several thousand Africans were military trained.

Libya had sought to improve US relations under President Jimmy Carter, for instance by courting his brother, businessman Billy Carter, and paying for the services of former CIA officers, but in 1979 the US placed Libya on its list of "State Sponsors of Terrorism". Relations were further damaged when a demonstration torched the US embassy in solidarity with the perpetrators of the Iran hostage crisis. Libyan fighters began intercepting US fighter jets flying over the Mediterranean, signalling the collapse of relations between the countries. Italian media have alleged that the Itavia Flight 870 was shot down during a dogfight involving Libyan, United States, French and Italian Air Force fighters in an assassination attempt by NATO members on a Libyan politician, perhaps even Gaddafi, flying in the same airspace.

Libyan relations with Lebanon and Shi'ite communities deteriorated due to the 1978 disappearance of Imam Musa al-Sadr when visiting Libya; the Lebanese accused Gaddafi of having him killed or imprisoned, a charge he denied. Relations with Pakistan broke down in this period. Despite Gaddafi's repeated appeals to Muhammad Zia-ul-Haq to spare Zulfikar Ali Bhutto's life, Bhutto was executed in 1979. In retaliation and for Zia's refusal to share Pakistan's nuclear technology, Gaddafi began training Al-Zulfikar, an anti-Zia insurgency led by Bhutto's sons Murtaza and Shahnawaz, expelled all 150,000 Pakistanis living in Libya, and provided asylum for the Bhutto family. Relations with Syria improved, as Gaddafi and Syrian President Hafez al-Assad shared an enmity with Israel and Egypt's Sadat. In 1980, they proposed a political union, with Libya promising to pay off Syria's £1-billion debt to the Soviet Union; although pressures led Assad to pull out, they remained allies. Another key ally was Uganda, and in 1979, during the Uganda–Tanzania War, Gaddafi sent 2,500 troops to defend President Idi Amin from Tanzanian invaders. The mission failed; 400 Libyans were killed, and Libya was forced to retreat. Gaddafi came to regret his alliance with Amin, openly criticizing him as a "fascist" and a "show-off".

=== Conflict with the US and its allies: 1981–1986 ===
The early 80s saw economic trouble in Libya; from 1982 to 1986, annual oil revenues dropped from $21 to $5.4 billion. Focusing on irrigation projects, 1983 saw construction start on Libya's largest and most expensive infrastructure project, the Great Man-Made River; although designed to be finished by the end of the decade, it remained incomplete at the start of the 21st century. Military spending increased, while other administrative budgets were cut. Foreign debt rose, and austerity measures were introduced to promote self-reliance; in 1985 there was a mass deportation of foreign workers, mostly Egyptian and Tunisian. Domestic threats continued to plague Gaddafi; in May 1984, his Bab al-Azizia home was unsuccessfully attacked by a militia—linked to the NFSL or Muslim Brotherhood—and in the aftermath 5,000 dissidents were arrested. In spring 1985, members of the military tried to assassinate Gaddafi twice. The first was a plot by conservative officers to assassinate him at a villa on the outskirts of Tripoli; the second was an assault on his convoy. In November 1985, Colonel Hassan Ishkal, the third most powerful man in Libya, head of the military region of Sirte, died in a suspicious car accident. Ishkal's death was attributed to Jalloud, Khalifa Hunaysh or Gaddafi.

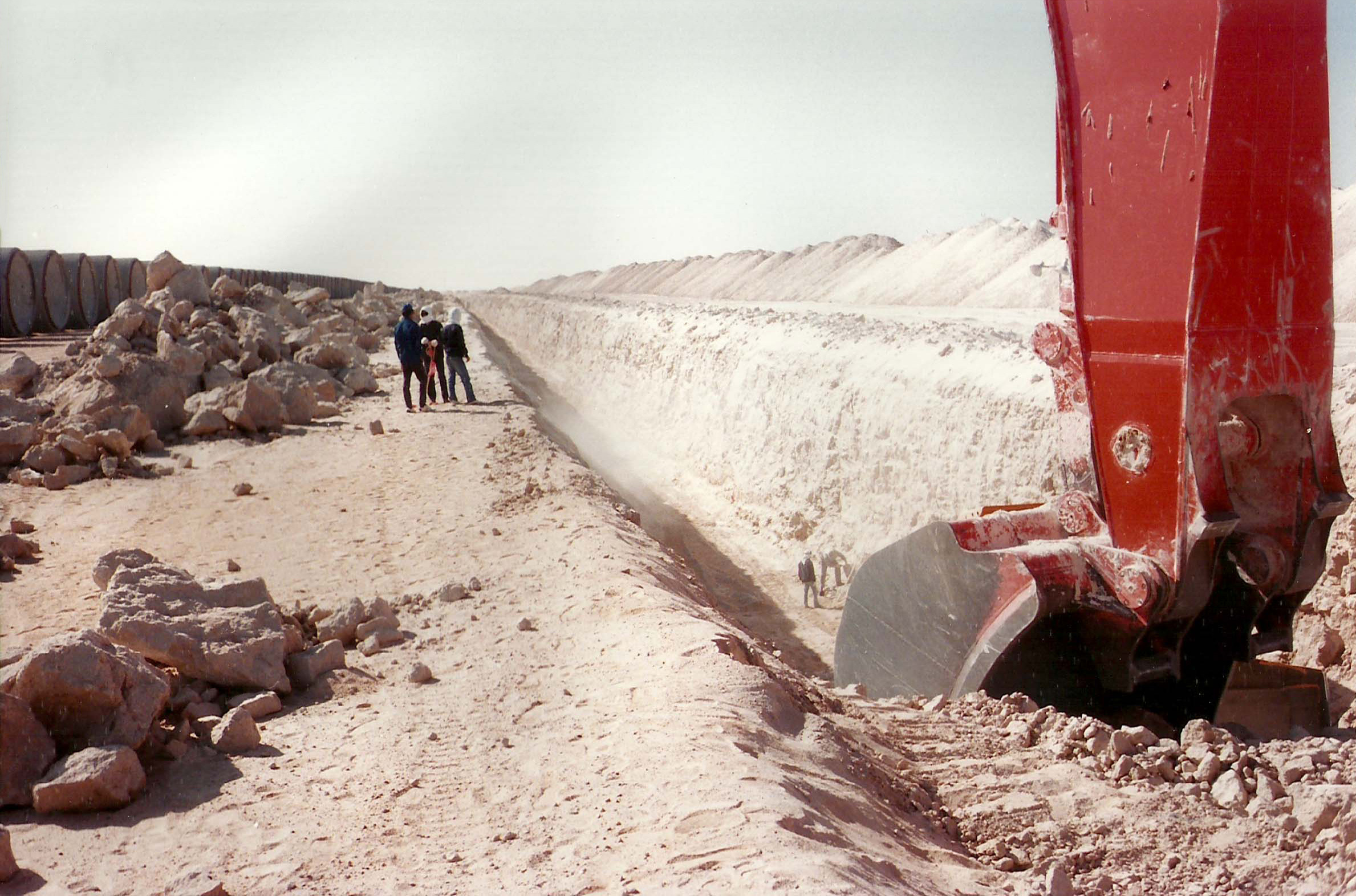
Construction for the Great Man-Made River Project

Libya had long supported the FROLINAT militia in neighbouring Chad, but FROLINAT became divided over its ties to Libya in 1976. In January 1978, the anti-Libya faction within FROLINAT, led by Hissène Habré, switched sides and allied with Chadian President Félix Malloum. Meanwhile, the pro-Libya faction within FROLINAT, led by Goukouni Oueddei, renamed itself People's Armed Forces (FAP). In December 1980, Gaddafi reinvaded Chad at the request of the FAP-controlled GUNT government to aid in the civil war; in January 1981, Gaddafi suggested a political merger. The Organisation of African Unity (OAU) rejected this and called for a Libyan withdrawal, which came in November 1981. The civil war resumed, and Libya sent troops back in.

In 1982, the GUNT government was overthrown by Habré's forces and Oueddei fled to Libya, where Gaddafi provided him with arms to continue to guerrilla war against Habré. In November 1984, Gaddafi met with French President François Mitterrand; both agreed to withdraw from Chad. Oueddei broke with Gaddafi in 1985 due to the former's intentions to negotiate a truce with Habré. Consequently, he was placed under house arrest by Gaddafi and allegedly arrested by Libyan police and shot in the stomach. Oueddei survived the shooting and fled to Algeria, but continued to claim he and Gaddafi enjoyed a good relationship. When Gaddafi ordered the remnant of GUNT to attack Habré in February 1986 in violation of his agreement with Mitterrand, France launched Operation Épervier, which escalated into the Toyota War. Libya suffered a humiliating defeat as it was completely expelled from Chad and its commander Khalifa Haftar captured, along with 600-700 Libyan soldiers. Gaddafi disavowed Haftar and the other prisoners; one possible contributing factor to this repudiation may have been that Gaddafi had signed an agreement to withdraw Libyan forces, and Haftar's operations had been in violation of this. An embittered Haftar then joined the anti-Gaddafi National Front for the Salvation of Libya, became a CIA asset, and was given refuge in the US.

Many African nations were tired of Libya's interference in their affairs; by 1980, nine African states had severed diplomatic relations, while in 1982 the OAU cancelled its scheduled conference in Tripoli to prevent Gaddafi gaining chairmanship. Some African states, however, such as Jerry Rawlings's Ghana and Thomas Sankara's Burkina Faso, had warm relations with Libya during the 1980s.

Proposing political unity with Morocco, in August 1984, Gaddafi and Moroccan monarch Hassan II signed the Oujda Treaty, forming the Arab–African Union; such a union was considered surprising due to the political differences and longstanding enmity that existed between the two. In a sign of warming relations, Gaddafi promised to stop funding the Polisario Front and Hassan II extradited former RCC member Umar Muhayshi to Libya, where he was immediately killed. But relations deteriorated, particularly due to Morocco's friendship with the US and Israel; in August 1986, Hassan abolished the union. Angered by the snub, Gaddafi plotted with Abu Nidal to assassinate Hassan in 1987, but the plot was aborted.

In 1981, the new US president, Ronald Reagan, pursued a hardline approach to Libya, viewing it as a puppet regime of the Soviet Union. Gaddafi played up his commercial relationship with the Soviets, revisiting Moscow in 1981 and 1985, and threatening to join the Warsaw Pact. The Soviets were nevertheless cautious of Gaddafi, seeing him as an unpredictable extremist. In August 1981, the US staged military exercises in the Gulf of Sirte – an area which Libya claimed. The US shot down two Libyan Su-22 planes which were on an intercept course. Closing down Libya's embassy in Washington, Reagan advised US companies operating in Libya to reduce Americans stationed there. In December 1981, the White House claimed Gaddafi had dispatched a hit squad to assassinate Reagan, allegedly led by Carlos the Jackal, who had been living in Libya under Gaddafi's protection after the 1975 OPEC siege. Secretary of State Alexander Haig, Defense Secretary Caspar Weinberger, Counselor to the President Edwin Meese, chief of staff James Baker, and deputy chief of staff Michael Deaver were considered potential targets and given special security. US ambassador to Italy Maxwell M. Rabb, who was Jewish, was urgently recalled due to threats against his life. Gaddafi denied the allegations. Gaddafi was accused of having ties to the Lebanese Armed Revolutionary Factions, which had murdered US military attaché Charles R. Ray and Israeli diplomat Yacov Barsimantov in Paris. In March 1982, the US implemented an embargo of Libyan oil, and in January 1986 ordered all US companies to cease operating in the country, although several hundred workers remained when the Libyan government doubled their pay. In spring 1986, the US Navy again performed exercises in the Gulf of Sirte; the Libyan military retaliated, but failed as the US sank Libyan ships. Diplomatic relations also broke down with the UK, after Libyan diplomats were accused in the killing of Yvonne Fletcher, a British policewoman stationed outside their London embassy, in April 1984.

In 1980, Gaddafi hired former CIA agent Edwin P. Wilson, living in Libya as a fugitive from US justice, to plot the murder of an anti-Gaddafi Libyan graduate student at Colorado State University named Faisal Zagallai. Zagallai was shot in the head in October 1980, in Fort Collins, Colorado by a former Green Beret and associate of Wilson named Eugene Tafoya. Zagallai survived the attack and Tafoya was convicted of third-degree assault and conspiracy to commit assault. Wilson was lured back to the US and sentenced to 32 years due to his ties to Gaddafi. In 1984, Gaddafi publicly executed Al-Sadek Hamed Al-Shuwehdy, an aeronautical engineer studying in the US.

After the US accused Libya of orchestrating the 1986 Berlin discotheque bombing, in which two US soldiers died, Reagan decided to retaliate. The CIA was critical of the move, believing Syria was a greater threat and that an attack would strengthen Gaddafi's reputation; however, Libya was recognized as a "soft target". Reagan was supported by the UK, but opposed by other European allies, who argued it contravened international law. In Operation El Dorado Canyon, orchestrated on 15 April 1986, US military planes launched air-strikes, bombing military installations, killing around 100 Libyans, including civilians. One target had been Gaddafi's home. Himself unharmed, two of Gaddafi's sons were injured, and he claimed his adopted daughter Hanna was killed, although her existence has since been questioned. Gaddafi retreated to the desert to meditate. There were sporadic clashes between Gaddafists and army officers who wanted to overthrow the government. Although the US was condemned internationally, Reagan received a popularity boost at home. Publicly lambasting US imperialism, Gaddafi's reputation as an anti-imperialist was strengthened domestically and across the Arab world, and, in June 1986, he ordered the names of the months to be changed in Libya.

=== "Revolution within a Revolution": 1987–1998 ===
The late 1980s saw a series of liberalizing economic reforms within Libya designed to cope with the decline in oil revenues. In May 1987, Gaddafi announced the start of the "Revolution within a Revolution", which began with reforms to industry and agriculture and saw the re-opening of small business. Restrictions were placed on the activities of the Revolutionary Committees; in March 1988, their role was narrowed by the newly created Ministry for Mass Mobilization and Revolutionary Leadership to restrict their violence and judicial role, while in August 1988 Gaddafi publicly criticized them. In March, hundreds of political prisoners were freed, with Gaddafi falsely claiming that there were no further political prisoners in Libya. In June, Libya's government issued the Great Green Charter on Human Rights in the Era of the Masses, in which 27 articles laid out goals, rights, and guarantees to improve the situation of human rights in Libya, restricting the use of the death penalty and calling for its eventual abolition. Many of the measures suggested in the charter would be implemented the next year, although others remained inactive. Also in 1989, the government founded the Al-Gaddafi International Prize for Human Rights, to be awarded to figures from the Third World who had struggled against colonialism and imperialism; the first year's winner was South African anti-apartheid activist Nelson Mandela. From 1994 through to 1997, the government initiated cleansing committees to root out corruption, particularly in the economic sector.

In the aftermath of the 1986 US attack, the army was purged of perceived disloyal elements, and in 1988, Gaddafi announced the creation of a popular militia to replace the army and police. In 1987, Libya began production of mustard gas at a facility in Rabta, although publicly denied it was stockpiling chemical weapons, and unsuccessfully attempted to develop nuclear weapons. The period also saw a growth in domestic Islamist opposition, formulated into groups like the Muslim Brotherhood and the Libyan Islamic Fighting Group. Several assassination attempts against Gaddafi were foiled, and in turn, 1989 saw the security forces raid mosques believed to be centres of counter-revolutionary preaching. In December 1993, former Libyan foreign minister Mansour Rashid El-Kikhia, a leader of an anti-Gaddafi coalition in exile, was abducted in Cairo. His body was not found until 2012 in a morgue that belonged to Gaddafi's intelligence chief Abdullah Senussi.

In October 1993, elements of the increasingly marginalized army, led by officers from the powerful Warfalla tribe, initiated a failed coup in Misrata and Bani Walid allegedly with help from the National Front for the Salvation of Libya, Khalifa Haftar, and the CIA, while in September 1995, Islamists launched an insurgency in Benghazi, and in July 1996 an anti-Gaddafist football riot broke out in Tripoli. In March 1996, Haftar again briefly returned to Libya to instigate an uprising against Gaddafi in the mountains of eastern Libya. The Revolutionary Committees experienced a resurgence to combat these Islamists.

In 1989, Gaddafi was overjoyed by the foundation of the Arab Maghreb Union, uniting Libya in an economic pact with Mauritania, Morocco, Tunisia, and Algeria, viewing it as beginnings of a new pan-Arab union. Gaddafi was able to recover some influence in Chad after Hissène Habré was overthrown by Idriss Déby in a Libya-sponsored coup in 1990. Déby also gave Gaddafi detailed information about CIA operations in Chad. Meanwhile, Libya stepped up its support for anti-Western militants such as the Provisional IRA, and in 1988, Pan Am Flight 103 was blown up over Lockerbie in Scotland, killing 243 passengers and 16 crew members, plus 11 people on the ground. British police investigations identified two Libyans – Abdelbaset al-Megrahi and Lamin Khalifah Fhimah – as the chief suspects, and in November 1991 issued a declaration demanding that Libya hand them over. When Gaddafi refused, citing the Montreal Convention, the United Nations (UN) imposed Resolution 748 in March 1992, initiating economic sanctions against Libya which had deep repercussions for the country's economy. The country suffered an estimated US$900 million financial loss as a result. On 5 November 1995, US President Bill Clinton declared the US would continue to induce pressure on Libya, also recognizing that Libyan terrorists were responsible for the Lockerbie bombing. Further problems arose with the West when in January 1989, two Libyan warplanes were shot down by the US off the Libyan coast and in September 1989, UTA Flight 772 was blown up over the Ténéré desert in Niger, killing all 170 people on board (156 passengers and 14 crew members).

In 1996, Gaddafi wrote a letter to the newly elected Prime Minister of Bangladesh, Sheikh Mujibur Rahman's daughter Sheikh Hasina, pleading with her to spare the lives of her father's assassins Syed Faruque Rahman and Khandaker Abdur Rashid. Rahman and Rashid both had business ties to Libya.

Many Arab and African states opposed the UN sanctions, with Mandela criticizing them on a visit to Gaddafi in October 1997, when he praised Libya for its work in fighting apartheid and awarded Gaddafi the Order of Good Hope. They would only be suspended in 1998 when Libya agreed to allow the extradition of the suspects to the Scottish Court in the Netherlands, in a process overseen by Mandela. As a result of the trial, Fhimah was acquitted and al-Megrahi convicted. Privately, Gaddafi maintained that he knew nothing about who perpetrated the bombing and that Libya had nothing to do with it.

=== Pan-Africanism, reconciliation and privatization: 1999–2011 ===
==== Links with Africa and conflicts in the Arab League ====
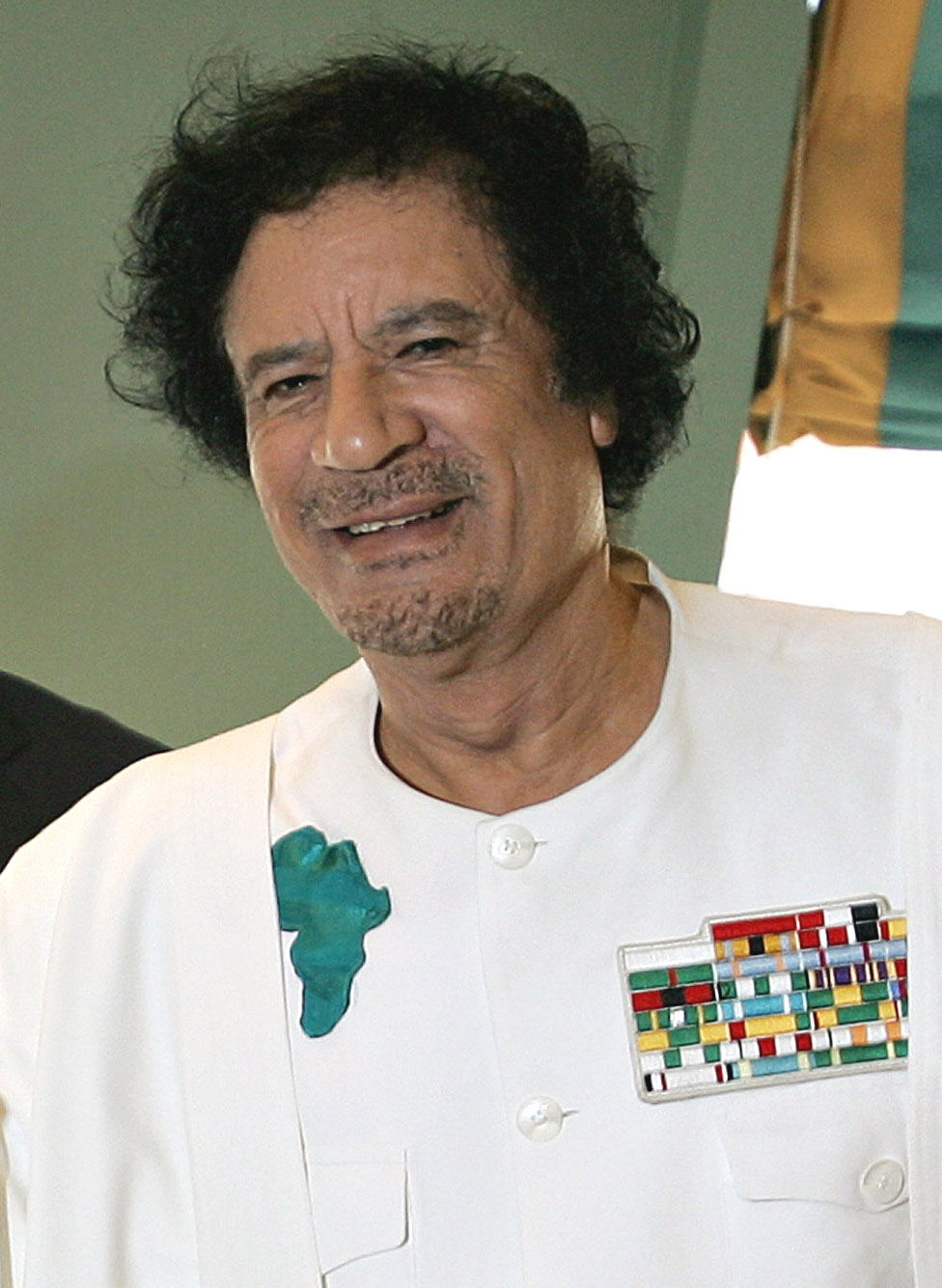
Gaddafi wearing an insignia showing the image of the African continent, 2006

During the final years of the 20th century, Gaddafi—frustrated by the failure of his pan-Arab ideals and the refusal of the Arab world to challenge the international air embargo imposed on Libya—increasingly rejected Arab nationalism in favour of pan-Africanism, emphasizing Libya's African identity. In a 1998 interview, Gaddafi claimed that "the Arab world is finished" and expressed his wish for Libya to become a "black country". From 1997 to 2000, Libya initiated cooperative agreements or bilateral aid arrangements with 10 African states, and in 1999 joined the Community of Sahel–Saharan States (CEN–SAD). In June 1999, Gaddafi visited Mandela in South Africa, and the next month attended the OAU summit in Algiers, calling for greater political and economic integration across the continent and advocating the foundation of a United States of Africa. He became one of the founders of the African Union (AU), initiated in July 2002 to replace the OAU. At the opening ceremonies, he called for African states to reject conditional aid from the developed world, a direct contrast to the message of South African President Thabo Mbeki. There was speculation that Gaddafi wanted to become the AU's first chair, raising concerns within Africa that this would damage the Union's international standing, particularly with the West.

At the third AU summit, held in Tripoli, Libya, in July 2005, Gaddafi called for greater integration, advocating a single AU passport, a common defence system, and a single currency, using the slogan: "The United States of Africa is the hope." His proposal for a Union of African States, a project originally conceived by Ghana's Kwame Nkrumah in the 1960s, was rejected at the 2001 Assembly of Heads of States and Government (AHSG) summit in Lusaka by African leaders who thought it "unrealistic" and "utopian". In June 2005, Libya joined the Common Market for Eastern and Southern Africa (COMESA). In March 2008 in Uganda, Gaddafi gave a speech once again urging Africa to reject foreign aid. In August 2008, Gaddafi was proclaimed "King of Kings" by a committee of traditional African leaders; they crowned him in February 2009, in a ceremony held in Addis Ababa, Ethiopia. That same month, Gaddafi was elected as the chairperson of the African Union, a position he retained for one year. In October 2010, Gaddafi apologized to African leaders for the historical enslavement of Africans by the Arab slave trade.

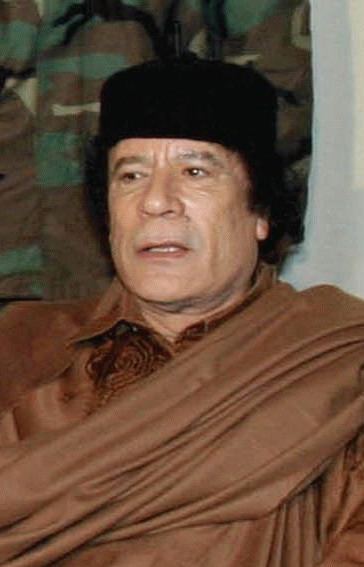
Gaddafi in 2003

Meanwhile, Gaddafi continued to have testy relationships with most of his fellow Arab leaders. In the 2003 Arab League summit, Gaddafi was involved in a public verbal altercation with Abdullah of Saudi Arabia, then the Crown Prince. Gaddafi accused Saudi Arabia of having made an "alliance with the devil" when it invited the US to intervene in the 1991 Gulf War. Abdullah responded that Gaddafi was a "liar" and an "agent of colonizers" and threatened Gaddafi that "your grave awaits you." Two weeks after the summit, Gaddafi allegedly plotted with the Emir Hamad bin Khalifa Al Thani of Qatar to assassinate Abdullah. The plot was overseen by Libyan intelligence chief Moussa Koussa, Mohammed Ismail (a colonel in Gaddafi's military intelligence), and Abdul Rahman al-Amoudi (an American citizen and founder of American Muslim Council). The assassination conspiracy was foiled by Saudi intelligence with the help of the FBI and CIA. Amoudi was sentenced to 23 years in prison in the US and stripped of his American citizenship. Ismail was arrested by Saudi Arabia, pardoned by Abdullah in 2005, and later acquired UAE citizenship due to his close ties with its ruler Mohamed bin Zayed Al Nahyan. After the failure of the assassination plot, Gaddafi continued to discuss instigating a regime change in Saudi Arabia with multiple power brokers in the Persian Gulf, including Qatar's Foreign Minister Hamad bin Jassim bin Jaber Al Thani, Oman's foreign minister Yusuf bin Alawi bin Abdullah, and Kuwaiti extremist preacher Hakem al-Mutairi.

The Gaddafi–Abdullah feud came into public view again in the 2009 Arab League summit when Gaddafi accused Abdullah, who had become King of Saudi Arabia in 2005, of being created by Britain and protected by the US. Alluding to their 2003 altercation, Gaddafi taunted Abdullah for ostensibly avoiding a confrontation with him for six years and quoted Abdullah's 2003 "grave awaits you" threat back at him before storming out of the meeting to visit a museum. Abdullah also left the meeting hall in anger. A Saudi official later claimed that Gaddafi and Abdullah had held a 30 minutes meeting at the sideline of the summit and that the "personal problem" between them was "over". However, Gaddafi had given weapons and money to the Houthis to attack Saudi Arabia.

==== Rebuilding links with the West ====
In 1999, Libya began secret talks with the British government to normalize relations. In 2001, Gaddafi publicly condemned the September 11 attacks on the US by al-Qaeda, expressing sympathy with the victims and calling for Libyan involvement in the US-led war on terror against militant Islamism. His government continued suppressing domestic Islamism, at the same time as Gaddafi called for the wider application of sharia law. Libya also cemented connections with China and North Korea, being visited by Chinese President Jiang Zemin in April 2002. However, relations with China became strained in May 2006 due to a visit to Tripoli by Taiwanese President Chen Shui-bian. Influenced by the events of the Iraq War, in December 2003, Libya renounced its possession of weapons of mass destruction, decommissioning its chemical and nuclear weapons programs. Relations with the US improved as a result. British Prime Minister Tony Blair visited Gaddafi in March 2004; the pair developed close personal ties. In 2003, Libya paid US$2.7 billion to the families of the victims of the Lockerbie bombing as it was the condition the US and UK had made for terminating the remaining UN sanctions. Libya continued to deny any role in the bombing. In 2009, Gaddafi attempted to strong-arm global energy companies operating in Libya to cover Libya's settlement with the families of the victims of Lockerbie.

Video showing the meeting with Russian Prime Minister Vladimir Putin and Muammar Gaddafi, in 2008

In 2004, Gaddafi traveled to the headquarters of the European Union (EU) in Brussels—signifying improved relations between Libya and the EU—and the EU dropped its sanctions on Libya. As a strategic player in Europe's attempts to stem illegal migration from Africa, in October 2010, the EU paid Libya over €50 million to stop African migrants passing into Europe; Gaddafi encouraged the move, saying that it was necessary to prevent the loss of European cultural identity to a new "Black Europe". Gaddafi also completed agreements with the Italian government that they would invest in various infrastructure projects as reparations for past Italian colonial policies in Libya. Italian Prime Minister Silvio Berlusconi gave Libya an official apology in 2006, after which Gaddafi called him the "iron man" for his courage in doing so. In August 2008, Gaddafi and Berlusconi signed a historic cooperation treaty in Benghazi; under its terms, Italy would pay $5 billion to Libya as compensation for its former military occupation. In exchange, Libya would take measures to combat illegal immigration coming from its shores and boost investment in Italian companies.

After the US removed Libya from its list of state sponsors of terrorism in 2006, Gaddafi nevertheless continued his anti-Western rhetoric. At the 2008 Arab League summit, held in Syria, he warned fellow Arab leaders that they could be overthrown and executed by the US like Saddam Hussein. At the Second Africa-South America Summit, held in Venezuela in September 2009, he called for a military alliance across Africa and Latin America to rival NATO. That same month he traveled to New York City and addressed the United Nations General Assembly for the first time on 23 September 2009, using it to condemn "Western aggression", and spoke for just over 90 minutes instead of the allotted 15. In the spring of 2010, Gaddafi proclaimed jihad against Switzerland after Swiss police accused two of his family members of criminal activity in the country, resulting in the breakdown of bilateral relations.

Gaddafi allegedly financed Nicolas Sarkozy in the 2007 French presidential election. He also financed Austrian far-right politician Jörg Haider starting in 2000.

As revealed by documents found in Moussa Koussa's Tripoli office, the CIA and MI6 both extradited terrorism suspects to Libya from 2002 to 2004, with the CIA having sent suspects for questioning to Libya at least 8 times, despite the nation's reputation for torture. A 2012 Human Rights Watch report conducted interviews with 14 former Libyan detainees, mostly members of the anti-Gaddafi Libyan Islamic Fighting Group, who testified to being tortured at CIA prisons through methods such as waterboarding before their extradition to Libya, followed by torture in Libyan prisons by beating and use of electric shocks. The leader of the Libyan Islamist Fighting Group, Abdel-Hakim Belhaj, stated that while being tortured in Abu Salim prison, he was forced to give information regarding Libyans living in the United Kingdom, who were then allegedly arbitrarily arrested by the British government.

==== Economic reform ====
Libya's economy witnessed increasing privatization; although rejecting the socialist policies of nationalized industry advocated in The Green Book, government figures asserted that they were forging "people's socialism" rather than capitalism. Gaddafi welcomed these reforms, calling for wide-scale privatization in a March 2003 speech; he promised that Libya would join the World Trade Organization. These reforms encouraged private investment in Libya's economy. By 2004, there was US$40 billion of direct foreign investment in Libya, a six-fold rise over 2003. Sectors of Libya's population reacted against these reforms with public demonstrations, and in March 2006, revolutionary hard-liners took control of the GPC cabinet; although scaling back the pace of the changes, they did not halt them. In 2010, plans were announced that would have seen half the Libyan economy privatized over the next decade, these plans appear to have been soon abandoned however, as the companies that the government stated they were going to float on the stock market, among them the National Commercial Bank and the Libyan Iron and Steel Company were never floated and remained 100% state-owned. Many socialist policies remained however, with subsidiaries of logistics company HB Group being nationalized in 2007. Agriculture remained largely untouched by the reforms, with farms remaining cooperatives, the Agricultural Bank of Libya remaining wholly state-owned and state interventionist policies and price controls remaining. The oil industry remained largely state-owned, with the wholly state-owned National Oil Corporation retaining a 70% share in Libya's oil industry, the government also imposed a 93% tax on all oil that foreign companies produced in Libya. Price controls and subsidies over oil and food remained in place, and state-provided benefits such as free education, universal healthcare, free housing, free water and free electricity remained in place. Libya also changed its stance on the WTO after the removal of technocrat Shukri Ghanem, with Gaddafi condemning the WTO as a neocolonial terrorist organisation, and urging African and Third World countries not to join it.

While there was no accompanying political liberalization, with Gaddafi retaining predominant control, in March 2010, the government devolved further powers to the municipal councils. Rising numbers of reformist technocrats attained positions in the country's governance; best known was Gaddafi's son and heir apparent Saif al-Islam Gaddafi, who was openly critical of Libya's human rights record. He led a group who proposed the drafting of a new constitution, although it was never adopted. Involved in encouraging tourism, Saif founded several privately run media channels in 2008, but after criticizing the government, they were nationalized in 2009.

== Libyan civil war and death ==
=== Origins and development: February–August 2011 ===
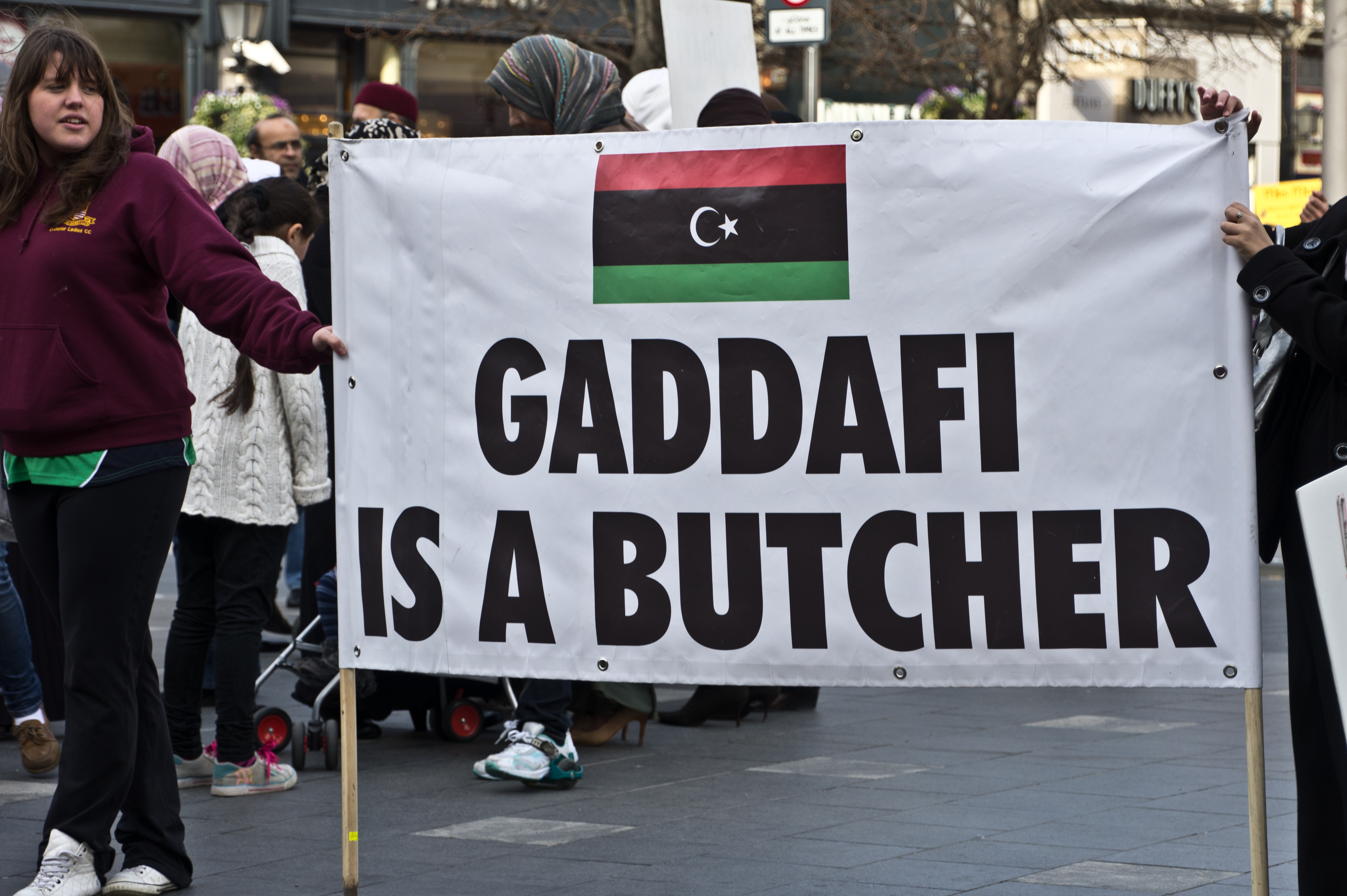
An anti-Gaddafist placard being displayed by demonstrators in Ireland in 2011.

After the start of the Arab Spring, in 2011, Gaddafi spoke out in favour of Tunisian President Zine El Abidine Ben Ali, then threatened by the Tunisian Revolution. He suggested that Tunisia's people would be satisfied if Ben Ali introduced a jamahiriyah system there. Fearing domestic protest, Libya's government implemented preventive measures by reducing food prices, purging the army leadership of potential defectors, and releasing several Islamist prisoners. This proved ineffective, and on 17 February 2011, major protests broke out against Gaddafi's government. Unlike Tunisia or Egypt, Libya was largely religiously homogeneous and had no strong Islamist movement, but there was widespread dissatisfaction with the corruption and entrenched systems of patronage, while unemployment had reached around 30 percent.

Accusing the rebels of being "drugged" and linked to al-Qaeda, Gaddafi proclaimed that he would die a martyr rather than leave Libya. As he announced that the rebels would be "hunted down street by street, house by house and wardrobe by wardrobe", the army opened fire on protesters in Benghazi, killing hundreds. Shocked at the government's response, a number of senior politicians resigned or defected to the protesters' side. The uprising spread quickly through Libya's less economically developed eastern half. By February's end, eastern cities such as Benghazi, Misrata, al-Bayda, and Tobruk were controlled by rebels, and the Benghazi-based National Transitional Council (NTC) formed to represent them.

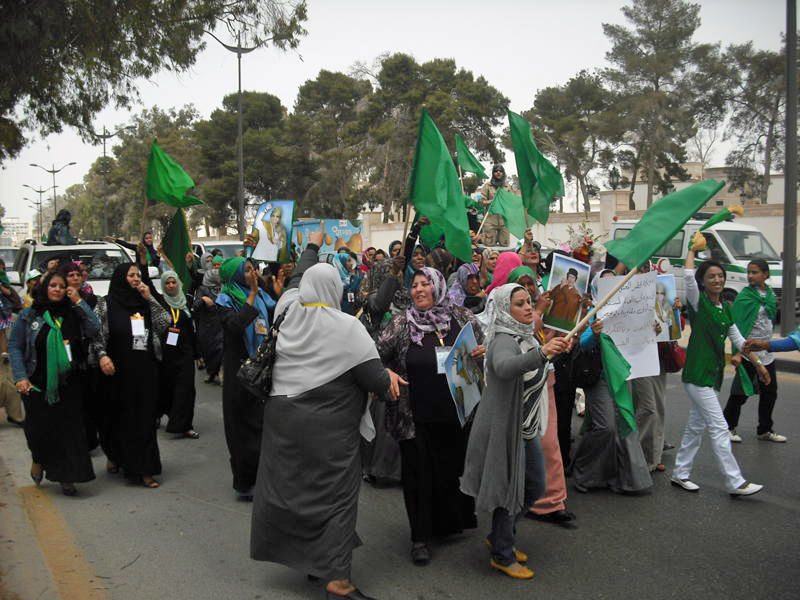
Pro-Gaddafi protests in Tripoli, May 2011

In the conflict's early months it appeared that Gaddafi's government—with its greater fire-power—would be victorious. Both sides disregarded the laws of war, committing human rights abuses, including arbitrary arrests, torture, extrajudicial executions, and revenge attacks. On 26 February, the United Nations Security Council passed Resolution 1970, suspending Libya from the UN Human Rights Council, implementing sanctions and calling for an International Criminal Court (ICC) investigation into the killing of unarmed civilians. In March, the Security Council declared a no-fly zone to protect the civilian population from aerial bombardment, calling on foreign nations to enforce it; it also specifically prohibited foreign occupation. Ignoring this, Qatar sent hundreds of troops to support the dissidents and, along with France and the United Arab Emirates, provided weaponry and military training to the NTC. NATO announced that it would enforce the no-fly zone. On 30 April a NATO airstrike killed Gaddafi's sixth son and three of his grandsons in Tripoli. This Western military intervention was criticized by various leftist governments, including those that had criticized Gaddafi's response to the protests, because they regarded it as an imperialist attempt to secure control of Libya's resources.

In June, the ICC issued arrest warrants for Gaddafi, his son Saif al-Islam, and his brother-in-law Abdullah Senussi, head of state security, for charges concerning crimes against humanity. That month, Amnesty International published their report, finding that Gaddafi's forces were responsible for numerous war crimes but added that a number of allegations of human rights abuses lacked credible evidence. The report added that "much Western media coverage has from the outset presented a very one-sided view of the logic of events, portraying the protest movement as entirely peaceful and repeatedly suggesting that the regime's security forces were unaccountably massacring unarmed demonstrators". In July, over 30 governments recognized the NTC as the legitimate government of Libya; Gaddafi called on his supporters to "Trample on those recognitions, trample on them under your feet ... They are worthless". In August, the Arab League recognized the NTC as "the legitimate representative of the Libyan state".

Aided by NATO air cover, the rebel militia pushed westward, defeating loyalist armies and securing control of the centre of the country. Gaining the support of Amazigh (Berber) communities of the Nafusa Mountains, who had long been persecuted as non-Arabic speakers under Gaddafi, the NTC armies surrounded Gaddafi loyalists in several key areas of western Libya. In August, the rebels seized Zliten and Tripoli, ending the last vestiges of Gaddafist power. It is probable that without the NATO air strikes supporting the rebels, they would not have been able to advance west and Gaddafi's forces would have ultimately retaken control of eastern Libya.

=== Capture and killing ===
After the fall of Tripoli in August 2011, only a few towns in western Libya such as Bani Walid, Sebha, and Sirte remained Gaddafist strongholds. Gaddafi was reportedly planning to catch up with his Sebha commander Ali Kanna's Tuareg forces and seek asylum in Burkina Faso. Instead, Gaddafi retreated to his hometown of Sirte, where he convened a meeting with his son Mutassim and intelligence chief Abdullah Senussi and learned that his youngest son Khamis had been killed by a NATO airstrike on 29 August. In the weeks that followed, Gaddafi continued to broadcast defiant audio messages through Syria-based Arrai TV. On 10 September, General Massoud Abdel Hafiz announced the formation of the Republic of Fezzan in Sebha, where Gaddafi would be president for life. Sebha fell on 22 September.

Surrounding himself with bodyguards and a small entourage, including Mutassim, security chief Mansour Dhao, and defense minister Abu-Bakr Yunis Jabr, Gaddafi continually changed residences to escape NATO and NTC shelling, devoting his days to prayer and reading the Qur'an. On 20 October, Gaddafi recorded a farewell audio message for his family, later publicized by Al-Hadath, and then broke out of Sirte's District 2 in a joint civilian-military convoy. According to Dhao, it was a "suicide mission" as Gaddafi wanted to die in the Jarref Valley, close to where he was born. At around 08:30, NATO bombers attacked, destroying at least 14 vehicles and killing at least 53 people. The convoy scattered, and Gaddafi and those closest to him fled to a nearby villa, which was shelled by rebel militia from Misrata. Fleeing to a construction site, Gaddafi and his inner cohort hid inside drainage pipes while his bodyguards battled the rebels; in the conflict, Gaddafi suffered head injuries from a grenade blast while Jabr was killed. The Misrata militia took Gaddafi prisoner, causing serious injuries as they tried to apprehend him; the events were filmed on a mobile phone. A video appears to picture Gaddafi being poked or stabbed in the anus "with some kind of stick or knife" or possibly a bayonet. Pulled onto the front of a pick-up truck, he fell off as it drove away. His semi-naked body was then placed into an ambulance and taken to Misrata; upon arrival, he was found to be dead. Official NTC accounts claimed that Gaddafi was caught in a crossfire and died from bullet wounds. Other eye-witness accounts claimed that rebels had fatally shot Gaddafi in the stomach.

That afternoon, NTC Prime Minister Mahmoud Jibril publicly revealed the news of Gaddafi's death. His corpse was placed in the freezer of a local market alongside the corpses of Yunis Jabr and Mutassim; the bodies were publicly displayed for four days, with Libyans from all over the country coming to view them. Footage of Gaddafi's death was broadcast extensively across media networks internationally. In response to international calls, on 24 October Jibril announced that a commission would investigate Gaddafi's death. On 25 October, the NTC announced that Gaddafi had been buried at an unidentified location in the desert.

== Political ideology ==
We call it the Third [International] Theory to indicate that there is a new path for all those who reject both materialist capitalism and atheist communism. The path is for all the people of the world who abhor the dangerous confrontation between the Warsaw and North Atlantic military alliances. It is for all those who believe that all nations of the world are brothers under the aegis of the rule of God.

— Muammar Gaddafi, 1973

Gaddafi's ideological worldview was molded by his environment, namely his Islamic faith, his Bedouin upbringing, and his disgust at the actions of Italian colonialists in Libya. As a schoolboy, Gaddafi adopted the ideologies of Arab nationalism and Arab socialism, influenced in particular by Nasserism, the thought of the Egyptian President Nasser, whom Gaddafi regarded as his hero; Nasser privately described Gaddafi as "a nice boy, but terribly naïve". During the early 1970s, Gaddafi formulated his own particular approach to Arab nationalism and socialism, known as Third International Theory, which The New York Times described as a combination of "utopian socialism, Arab nationalism, and the Third World revolutionary theory that was in vogue at the time". In addition to Nasser, Gaddafi also cited Charles de Gaulle, Sun Yat-sen, Abraham Lincoln and Josip Broz Tito as political inspirations. He regarded this system as a practical alternative to the then-dominant international models of Western capitalism and Marxism–Leninism. He laid out the principles of this Theory in the three volumes of The Green Book, in which he sought to "explain the structure of the ideal society".

The Libyan studies specialist Ronald Bruce St. John regarded Arab nationalism as Gaddafi's "primordial value", stating that during the early years of his government, Gaddafi was "the Arab nationalist par excellence". Gaddafi called for the Arab world to regain its dignity and assert a major place on the world stage, blaming Arab backwardness on stagnation resulting from Ottoman rule, European colonialism and imperialism, and corrupt and repressive monarchies. Gaddafi's Arab nationalist views led him to the pan-Arabist belief in the need for unity across the Arab world, combining the Arab nation under a single nation-state. To this end, he had proposed a political union with five neighbouring Arab states by 1974, although without success. In keeping with his views regarding Arabs, his political stance was described as nativist. Gaddafi also had international ambitions, wanting to export his revolutionary ideas throughout the world. Gaddafi saw his socialist Jamahiriyah as a model for the Arab, Islamic, and non-aligned worlds to follow, and in his speeches declared that his Third International Theory would eventually guide the entire planet. He nevertheless had minimal success in exporting the ideology outside of Libya.

Along with Arab nationalism, anti-imperialism was also a defining feature of Gaddafi's regime during its early years. He believed in opposing Western imperialism and colonialism in the Arab world, including any Western expansionism through the form of Israel. He offered support to a broad range of political groups abroad that called themselves "anti-imperialist", especially those that set themselves in opposition to the United States. For many years, anti-Zionism was a fundamental component of Gaddafi's ideology. He believed that the state of Israel should not exist and that any Arab compromise with the Israeli government was a betrayal of the Arab people. In large part due to their support of Israel, Gaddafi despised the United States, considering the country to be imperialist and lambasting it as "the embodiment of evil". He attributed the insularity, decadence, and the crumbling of American society to the Zionist lobby, once stating: "I think Americans are good. But America will be taken over and destroyed from inside by the Zionist lobby. The Americans do not see this. They are getting decadent. Zionists will use this to destroy them." He sought to distinguish "oriental" Jews who had lived in the Middle East for generations from the European Jews who had migrated to Palestine during the 20th century, calling the latter "vagabonds" and "mercenaries" who should return to Europe. He rallied against Jews in many of his speeches, with David Blundy and Andrew Lycett claiming that his antisemitism was "almost Hitlerian". As Pan-Africanism increasingly became his focus in the early 21st century, Gaddafi became less interested in the Israel-Palestine issue, calling for the two communities to form a new single-state that he termed "Isratin". This would have led the Jewish population to become a minority within the new state.

=== Islamic modernism and Islamic socialism ===
Gaddafi rejected the secularist approach to Arab nationalism that had been pervasive in Syria, with his revolutionary movement placing a far stronger emphasis on Islam than previous Arab nationalist movements had done. He deemed Arabism and Islam to be inseparable, referring to them as "one and indivisible", and called on the Arab world's Christian minority to convert to Islam. He insisted that Islamic law should be the basis for the law of the state, blurring any distinction between the religious and secular realms. He desired unity across the Islamic world, and encouraged the propagation of the faith elsewhere; on a 2010 visit to Italy, he paid a modelling agency to find 200 young Italian women for a lecture he gave urging them to convert. According to the Gaddafi biographer Jonathan Bearman, in Islamic terms Gaddafi was a modernist rather than a fundamentalist, for he subordinated religion to the political system rather than seeking to Islamicise the state as Islamists sought to do. He was driven by a sense of "divine mission", believing himself a conduit of God's will, and thought that he must achieve his goals "no matter what the cost". His interpretation of Islam was nevertheless idiosyncratic, and he clashed with conservative Libyan clerics. Many criticized his attempts to encourage women to enter traditionally male-only sectors of society, such as the armed forces. Gaddafi was keen to improve women's status, although saw the sexes as "separate but equal" and therefore felt women should usually remain in traditional roles.

The purpose of the socialist society is the happiness of man, which can only be realized through material and spiritual freedom. Attainment of such freedom depends on the extent of man's ownership of his needs; ownership that is personal and sacredly guaranteed, i.e. your needs must neither be owned by somebody else, nor subject to plunder by any part of society.

— Muammar Gaddafi

Gaddafi described his approach to economics as "Islamic socialism". For him, a socialist society could be defined as one in which men controlled their own needs, either through personal ownership or through a collective. Although the early policies pursued by his government were state capitalist in orientation, by 1978 he believed that private ownership of the means of production was exploitative and thus he sought to move Libya away from capitalism and towards socialism. Private enterprise was largely eliminated in favour of a centrally controlled economy. The extent to which Libya became socialist under Gaddafi is disputed. Bearman suggested that while Libya did undergo "a profound social revolution", he did not think that "a socialist society" was established in Libya. Conversely, St. John expressed the view that "if socialism is defined as a redistribution of wealth and resources, a socialist revolution clearly occurred in Libya" under Gaddafi's regime.

Gaddafi was staunchly anti-Marxist, and in 1973 declared that "it is the duty of every Muslim to combat" Marxism because it promotes atheism. In his view, ideologies like Marxism and Zionism were alien to the Islamic world and were a threat to the ummah, or global Islamic community. Nevertheless, Blundy and Lycett noted that Gaddafi's socialism had a "curiously Marxist undertone", with political scientist Sami Hajjar arguing that Gaddafi's model of socialism offered a simplification of Karl Marx and Friedrich Engels's theories. While acknowledging the Marxist influence on Gaddafi's thought, Bearman stated that the Libyan leader rejected Marxism's core tenet, that of class struggle as the main engine of social development. Instead of embracing the Marxist idea that a socialist society emerged from class struggle between the proletariat and bourgeoisie, Gaddafi believed that socialism would be achieved through overturning "unnatural" capitalism and returning society to its "natural equilibrium". In this, he sought to replace a capitalist economy with one based on his own romanticized ideas of a traditional, pre-capitalist past. This owed much to the Islamic belief in God's natural law providing order to the universe.

== Personal life ==
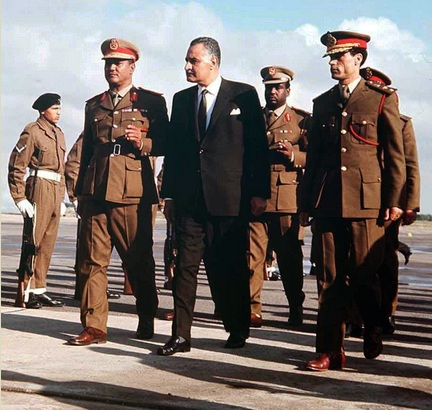
Gaddafi (right) with Nimeiry and Nasser in 1969

A very private individual, Gaddafi was given to rumination and solitude and could be reclusive. Gaddafi described himself as a "simple revolutionary" and "pious Muslim" called upon by God to continue Nasser's work. Gaddafi was an austere and devout Muslim, although, according to Vandewalle, his interpretation of Islam was "deeply personal and idiosyncratic". He was also a football enthusiast and enjoyed both playing that game and horse-riding as a means of recreation. He regarded himself as an intellectual; he was a fan of Beethoven and said his favourite novels were Uncle Tom's Cabin, Roots, and The Outsider. He frequently referred to himself in the third person.

Gaddafi considered personal appearance important; Blundy and Lycett described him as "extraordinarily vain". Gaddafi had a large wardrobe, and sometimes changed his outfit more than once a day. He favoured either a military uniform or traditional Libyan dress, tending to eschew Western-style suits. He saw himself as a fashion icon, stating "Whatever I wear becomes a fad. I wear a certain shirt and suddenly everyone is wearing it." After his ascension to power, Gaddafi moved to the Bab al-Azizia barracks, a 6-square-kilometre (2.3 square miles) fortified compound, 3.2 kilometres (2 miles) from the centre of Tripoli. In the 1980s, his lifestyle was considered modest in comparison to those of many other Arab leaders.

He was preoccupied with his own security, regularly changing where he slept and sometimes grounding all other planes in Libya when he was flying. He made particular requests when travelling to foreign countries. During his trips to Rome, Paris, Madrid, Moscow, and New York City, he refused to stay in a hotel and instead lived in a bulletproof tent, following his Bedouin traditions. Gaddafi was confrontational in his approach to foreign powers and generally shunned Western ambassadors and diplomats, believing them to be spies.

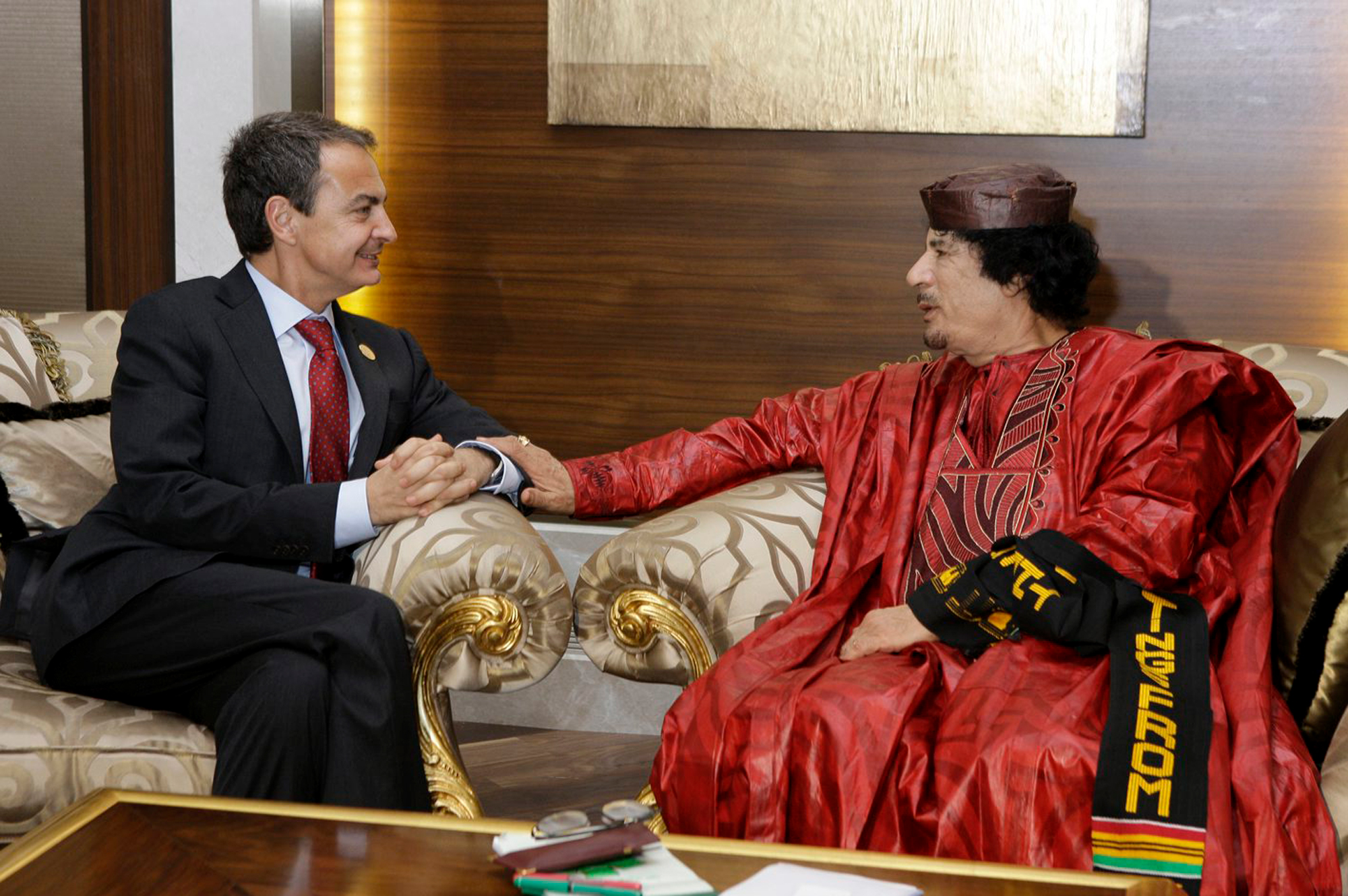
Gaddafi with Spanish Prime Minister José Luis Rodríguez Zapatero in 2010

In the 1970s and 1980s, there were reports of his making sexual advances toward female reporters and members of his entourage. Starting in the 1980s, he travelled with his all-female Amazonian Guard, who were allegedly sworn to a life of celibacy. After Gaddafi's death, a Libyan psychologist, Seham Sergewa, part of a team investigating sexual offences during the civil war, stated that five of the guards told her they had been raped by Gaddafi and senior officials. After Gaddafi's death, a French journalist, Annick Cojean, published a book alleging that Gaddafi had had sexual relations with women, some in their early teenage years, who had been specially selected for him. One of those Cojean interviewed, a woman named Soraya, claimed that Gaddafi kept her imprisoned in a basement for six years, where he repeatedly raped her; urinated on her; and forced her to watch pornography, drink alcohol, and snort cocaine. The sexual abuse was said to have been facilitated by Gaddafi's Chief of Protocol Nuri al-Mismari and Mabrouka Sherif. Gaddafi also hired several Ukrainian nurses to care for him; one described him as kind and considerate and was surprised that allegations of abuse had been made against him.

Gaddafi married his first wife, Fatiha al-Nuri, in 1969. They had one son, Muhammad Gaddafi (born 1970); their relationship was strained, and they divorced in 1970. Gaddafi's second wife was Safia Farkash, née el-Brasai, a former nurse from the Obeidat tribe, born in Bayda. They met in 1969, after his ascension to power, when he was hospitalized with appendicitis; he claimed that it was love at first sight. The couple remained married until his death. Together they had seven biological children: Saif al-Islam Gaddafi (1972–2026), Al-Saadi Gaddafi (born 1973), Mutassim Gaddafi (1974–2011), Hannibal Muammar Gaddafi (born 1975), Aisha Gaddafi (born 1976), Saif al-Arab Gaddafi (1982–2011), and Khamis Gaddafi (1983–2011). He also adopted two children, Hana Gaddafi and Milad Gaddafi. Several of his sons gained a reputation for lavish and anti-social behaviour in Libya, which proved a source of resentment toward his administration. At least three of his cousins were prominent figures in Gaddafi's regime. Ahmed Gaddaf al-Dam is Libya's former Special Envoy to Egypt and a leading figure of the Gaddafi regime. Mansour Dhao was his chief of security and led the People's Guard. Sayyid Gaddaf al-Dam was a brigadier general and described as the second most powerful person in Libya in the 1980s.

Saif al-Islam Gaddafi, the son who was considered to be Gaddafi's main heir, was assassinated in February 2026.

== Public life ==
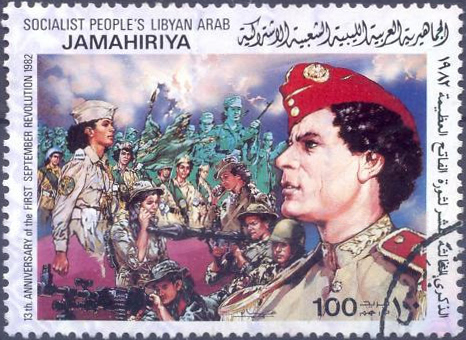
13th Anniversary of 1 September Revolution on postage stamp, Libya 1982

According to Vandewalle, Gaddafi "dominated [Libya's] political life" during his period in power. The sociologist Raymond A. Hinnebusch described the Libyan as "perhaps the most exemplary contemporary case of the politics of charismatic leadership", displaying all of the traits of charismatic authority outlined by the sociologist Max Weber. According to Hinnebusch, the foundations of Gaddafi's "personal charismatic authority" in Libya stemmed from the blessing he had received from Nasser coupled with "nationalist achievements" such as the expulsion of foreign military bases, the extraction of higher prices for Libyan oil, and his vocal support for the Palestinian and anti-imperialist causes.

A cult of personality devoted to Gaddafi existed in Libya through most of his rule. His biographer Alison Pargeter noted that "he filled every space, moulding the entire country around himself." Depictions of his face could be found throughout the country, including on postage stamps, watches, and school satchels. Quotations from The Green Book appeared on a wide variety of places, from street walls to airports and pens, and were put to pop music for public release. In private, Gaddafi often complained that he disliked this personality cult surrounding him, but that he tolerated it because the people of Libya adored him. The cult served a political purpose, with Gaddafi helping to provide a central identity for the Libyan state.

Several biographers and observers characterized Gaddafi as a populist. He enjoyed attending lengthy, often televised, public sessions where he was questioned. Throughout Libya, crowds of supporters arrived at public events where he appeared. Described as "spontaneous demonstrations" by the government, groups were often coerced or paid to attend. He was typically late to public events, sometimes failing to arrive. Although Bianco thought he had a "gift for oratory", he was considered a poor orator by Blundy and Lycett. The biographer Daniel Kawczynski noted that Gaddafi was famed for his "lengthy, wandering" speeches, which typically involved criticizing Israel and the US. The journalist Ruth First called his speeches "an inexhaustible flow; didactic, at times incoherent; peppered with snatches of half-formed opinions; admonitions; confidences; some sound common sense, and as much prejudice".

== Reception and legacy ==
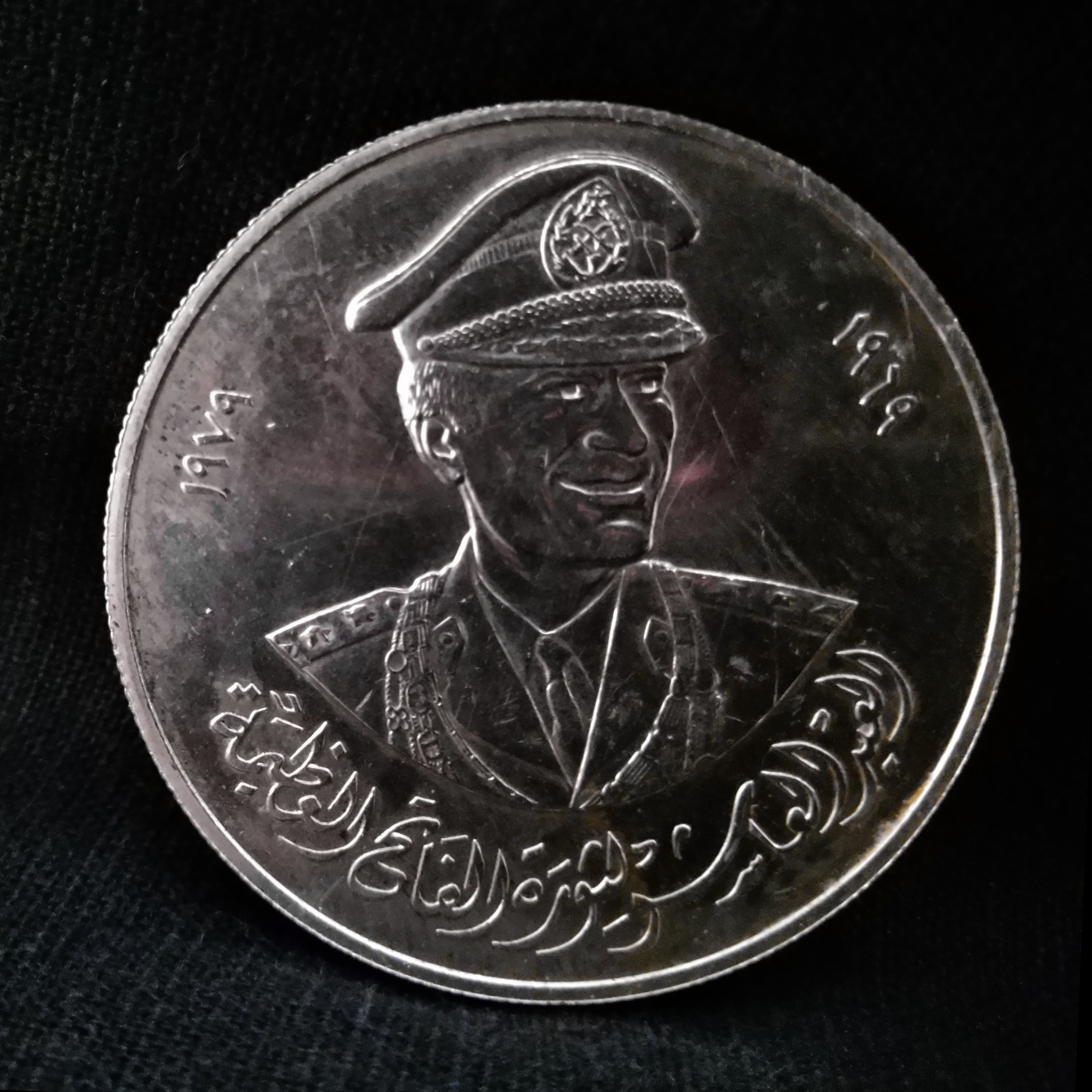
10th anniversary of Great Libyan Revolution coin

Supporters praised Gaddafi's administration for the creation of a more equal society through domestic reform. They stressed the regime's achievements in combating homelessness, ensuring access to food and safe drinking water, and to dramatic improvements in education. Supporters have also applauded achievements in medical care, praising the universal free healthcare provided under the Gaddafist administration, with diseases like cholera and typhoid being contained and life expectancy raised.

Gaddafi's government's treatment of non-Arab Libyans came in for criticism from human rights activists, with native Berbers, Italian colonists, Jews, refugees, and foreign workers all facing persecution in Gaddafist Libya. Human rights groups also criticized the treatment of migrants, including asylum seekers, who passed through Gaddafi's Libya on their way to Europe. During the Civil War, various leftist groups endorsed the anti-Gaddafist rebels—but not the Western military intervention—by arguing that Gaddafi had become an ally of Western imperialism by cooperating with the war on terror and efforts to block African migration to Europe. Gaddafi was widely perceived as a terrorist, especially in the US and UK.

=== Posthumous assessment ===
International reactions to Gaddafi's death were divided. Gaddafi was mourned as a hero by many across sub-Saharan Africa but was condemned as a brutal dictator in many Western nations.

After his defeat in the civil war, Gaddafi's system of governance was dismantled and replaced by the interim government of the NTC, which legalized trade unions and freedom of the press. In January 2013, the GNC officially renamed the Jamahiriyah as the "State of Libya". Gaddafi loyalists then founded a new political party, the Popular Front for the Liberation of Libya. Led by Saif al-Islam Gaddafi, the Popular Front was allowed to participate in the future general election.

== See also ==
- Alleged Libyan financing in the 2007 French presidential election
- Disarmament of Libya
- Egyptian–Libyan War
- History of Libya under Muammar Gaddafi
- HIV trial in Libya
- Libya and weapons of mass destruction
- List of heads of state and government deposed by foreign powers in the 20th and 21st century
- List of heads of state and government who were assassinated or executed
- List of state leaders who died in office
- Pan Am Flight 103
- SNC-Lavalin affair
- UTA Flight 772
- West Berlin discotheque bombing

== Notes ==
Political offices
Preceded by Idris as King of Libya	Chairman of the Revolutionary; Command Council of Libya; 1969–1977	Succeeded by Himself as Secretary General of the General People's Congress of Libya
Preceded by Mahmud Sulayman al-Maghribi	Prime Minister of Libya; 1970–1972	Succeeded by Abdessalam Jalloud
Preceded by Himself as Chairman of the Revolutionary; Command Council of Libya	Secretary General of the General People's Congress of Libya; 1977–1979	Succeeded by Abdul Ati al-Obeidi
New office	Brotherly Leader and Guide of the Revolution of Libya; 1977–2011	Succeeded by Position abolished
Diplomatic posts
Preceded by Jakaya Kikwete	Chairperson of the African Union; 2009–2010	Succeeded by Bingu wa Mutharika
