= Fathia Nuri Khalid =

First Lady of Libya from 1969 to 1970

First Lady of Libya
- In role 1 September 1969 – 2 September 1970
- Leader: Muammar Gaddafi
- Preceded by: Position established
- Succeeded by: Safia Farkash

Personal details
- Born: 20 February 1946 Tripoli, Libya
- Died: 23 July 2018 (aged 72) Muscat, Oman
- Resting place: a cemetery in Tripoli, Libya
- Spouse: Muammar Gaddafi (m. 1969; div. 1970)
- Children: Muhammad Gaddafi
- Occupation: Teacher, politician

Fathia Nuri Khalid (Arabic: فتحية نوري خالد, 20 February 1946 – 23 July 2018) was a Libyan teacher. She was the first wife of former Libyan leader Muammar Gaddafi, former First Lady of Libya, and mother of Gaddafi's eldest son Muhammad.

== Biography ==
Fathia Nuri Khalid was the first wife of Gaddafi. They married a few months before Gaddafi came to power. She was a teacher, and it is said that their marriage lasted only one year, before they divorced, and after that Gaddafi married Safia Farkash.
