= Ronald Bruce St. John =

American historian and writer (born 1943)

Ronald Bruce St. John (born 1943), also known as R. Bruce St. John, is an American historian and writer on international relations, and an affiliate professor at Bradley University.

== Early life ==
St. John graduated from Knox College, Illinois, in 1965. In 1970, he graduated Ph. D. from the University of Denver with a thesis on Peruvian foreign policy, 1919 to 1939.

== Career ==
From 1973 to 2001, St. John was an executive of Caterpillar Inc. From the 1980s, he also wrote articles and books, especially on Libya and South American history. He ended his career with Caterpillar as Head of Far East Operations, then became an affiliate professor of Bradley University and a member of the board of trustees of Knox College. He is a director of Hindustan Power Plus Ltd., the International Marine Certification Institute, and the Illinois Stewardship Alliance. In 1995, he was a member of the Siam Society.

In April 2003, St. John gave a lecture entitled "Out With the Old, In With the New: The Bush Administration and the Middle East". In May 2004, he wrote an article for Foreign Policy in Focus entitled "Bush policies make terrorism a growth industry", in which he stated that in its "war on terrorism" the White House was "not interested in the historical, political, economic and cultural factors that shape regional dissident groups" and that "Regional terrorist groups are invariably portrayed as having been co-opted by al-Qaeda and subject to its command and control." In October 2004, St. John observed that

The Bush administration does not appear to have learned any lessons from the Iraq imbroglio. The White House is now busy pursuing the same bellicose policies in Iran and Syria that led to the invasion of Iraq.

St. John has served on the Atlantic Council’s Working Group on Libya and the International Advisory Board of the Journal of Libyan Studies; in 2015 he was a consultant to the Department of State, the National Intelligence Council, Al Jazeera International, Associated Press, the BBC World Service, CNN News, National Geographic Magazine, NBC News, The New York Times, and The Washington Post.

In 2016, St. John was the keynote speaker at a United States Naval Special Warfare Command conference on terrorism in Libya, and later that year at a trial in Norway he gave expert evidence on corruption in Libya during the time of Qaddafi. A new edition of his Libya: From Colony to Revolution was reviewed in 2018 as "essential reading for those seeking a greater understanding of this complex North African state".

== Personal life ==
St. John is married. He has two sons and grandchildren.

== Selected publications ==
- Peruvian foreign policy, 1919-1939: the delimitation of frontiers (1969)
- R. B. St John, "Marxist-Leninist Theory and Organization in South Vietnam" in Far Eastern Survey 20, 8 (1980), pp. 812–828
- R. Bruce St. John, "The Ideology of Mu' ammar al-Qadhdhafi: Theory and Practice" in IJMES 15, 4 (1983) JSTOR 163557
- Qaddafi's World Design: Libyan Foreign Policy, 1969-1987 (Saqi Books, 1987) ISBN 978-0-86356-161-0
- R. B. St John, "The Libyan debacle in sub-Saharan Africa" in R. Lemarchand (ed.), The Green and the Black: Qadaffi's policies in Africa (Bloomington and Indianapolis: Indiana University Press 1988), pp. 125–138
- Ronald Bruce St. John, Clive Schofield, The Bolivia–Chile–Peru Dispute in the Atacama Desert (University of Durham, International Boundaries Research Unit, 1994) ISBN 1897643144
- Historical Dictionary of Libya (1991, 3rd ed., 1998)
- The Foreign Policy of Peru (Boulder, Colorado: Lynne Rienner Publishers, 1992)
- Boundaries, Trade, and Seaports: Power Politics in the Atacama Desert (1992)
- The Boundary between Ecuador and Peru (1994)
- World Boundaries: The Americas (1994)
- R. Bruce St. John, "Preah Vihear and the Cambodia-Thailand borderland" in Boundary and Security Bulletin 1, 4 (1994), pp. 64-68
- The Bolivia-Chile-Peru Dispute in the Atacama Desert (1995)
- R. Bruce St John, 'The Political Economy of the Royal Government of Cambodia', in Contemporary Southeast Asia, 17, 3 (December 1995)
- Foreign Policy and Regionalism in the Americas (1996)
- The Land Boundaries of Indochina: Cambodia, Laos and Vietnam (1998)
- La Politica Exterior del Peru (1999)
- Ecuador-Peru: Horizontes de la negociacion y el conflicto (1999)
- The Ecuador-Peru Boundary Dispute (1999)
- Libya and the United States: Two Centuries of Strife (University of Pennsylvania Press, 2002, 2nd edition 2013)
- R. Bruce St John, "'Libya Is Not Iraq': Preemptive Strikes, WMD and Diplomacy" in Middle East Journal 58/3 (2004)
- Revolution, Reform and Regionalism in Southeast Asia: Cambodia, Laos and Vietnam (New York: Routledge, 2006)
- R. Bruce St. John, "Redefining the Libyan Revolution: The Changing Ideology of Muammar al-Qaddafi" in Journal of North African Studies 13, 1 (2008), pp. 91–106
- Libya: Continuity and Change (Taylor and Francis, 2015) ISBN 9781135036539
- Libya: From Colony to Independence (Oneworld Publications, 2008) ISBN 978-1851685981
- Toledo's Peru: Vision and Reality (Gainesville, FL: University Press of Florida, 2010) ISBN 978-0813035215
- Libya: From Colony to Revolution (Oxford: Oneworld, 2011, revised edition 2017) ISBN 9781851689194
- R. B. St John "The Post-Qadhafi Economy", in J. Pack (ed.) The 2011 Libyan Uprisings and the Struggle for the Post-Qadhafi Future (Palgrave, 2013) ISBN 978-1137308085
- R. Bruce St. John, "Libya’s Authoritarian Tradition" in Noureddine Jebnoun, Mehrdad Kia, Mimi Kirk, eds. Modern Middle East Authoritarianism: Roots, Ramifications, and Crisis (Routledge, 2014), pp. 123-141
- Bolivia: Geopolitics of a Landlocked State (Routledge, 2019) ISBN 978-1857439694
- Peruvian Foreign Policy in the Modern Era (Anthem Press, 2023) ISBN 978-1839982255
