= Liwaa al-Umma =

Islamist group involved in the Syrian Civil War

Liwaa al-Umma لواء الامة
- Official logo of Liwa al-Umma Flag of Liwa al-Umma
- Leaders: Mahdi Al-Harati (April 2012 - September 2012); Abo altarek ahmed
- Dates active: April 2012 – 23 September 2015
- Active regions: Hama, Syria
- Ideology: Salafi jihadism
- Size: 6,000+ (July 2012)
- Part of: (Syria) Free Syrian Army (September 2012–13 January 2014); Muhajirin wa-Ansar Alliance (13 January 2014 – 23 September 2015)
- Wars: the Syrian Civil War

Liwaa al-Umma (Arabic: لواء الامة Liwāʼ al-Ummah, meaning "Banner of the Nation") was a Salafi jihadist group fighting against the Syrian government in the Syrian Civil War. The group was founded by Mahdi Al-Harati, an Irish-Libyan who led the Libyan rebel Tripoli Brigade during the Battle of Tripoli. Harati stepped down as the group's leader after six months, leaving Syrians in charge. In September 2012, it aligned itself with the Free Syrian Army.

By January 2014, Liwaa al-Umma had joined with other rebel groups in Hama Governorate, including Liwa al-Haqq and Jund al-Aqsa, into a Salafi jihadist coalition called the Muhajirin wa-Ansar Alliance (not to be confused with the Chechen-led Jaish al-Muhajireen wal-Ansar).

== Structure and membership ==
Harati decided to form the group following discussions with supporters of the Syrian opposition during a fact-finding mission to Syria in early 2012.

According to Harati, about 90% of its 6,000+ members were Syrians, with the remaining 10% a mixture of Libyans, Egyptians, Palestinians, Sudanese and other Arabs. Harati also said that most of the Syrian fighters were former members of other rebel groups who decided to join Liwaa al-Umma, whilst others had joined as individuals. He also said that most of the Libyans were former members of the Tripoli Brigade, which received training from Qatari Special Forces in the town of Nalut during the Libyan Civil War. Syrians in Liwaa al-Umma said that, compared to most other rebel groups in Syria, the group was seen as better organized and more disciplined.

Although allegedly most of its members were Syrian, foreign volunteers played a key role in the leadership of the group. The main alleged reason behind the formation of the group was so that Al-Harati and other foreign volunteers could share with the Syrian opposition their expertise and experiences fighting elsewhere.

Liwaa al-Umma and the Free Syrian Army were separate until around September 2012.

The group also reportedly had plans to set up a political wing to represent it in post-war Syria.

== Ideology ==
According to Thomas Pierret, a lecturer in contemporary Syrian Islam at the University of Edinburgh, "He (Al-Harati) is not a jihadi; he sees himself as a Libyan revolutionary there to help the Syrian revolution". Members of the group had described the Syrian Civil War as a "people's revolution" and not an "al-Qaeda jihad".

Radwan Mortada, from Al Akhbar newspaper, described the group as "jihadist" but not as extreme as other groups like the al-Nusra Front. According to the newspaper, the group held that every Muslim has a religious obligation to free Syrians from "the tyrant" and establish "right-guided Islamic rule" in the country. It also said that Liwaa al-Umma follows "Islamic rules of warfare", which includes not targeting non-combatants, carrying out reprisals against innocents, or harming property or possessions.

The group's alleged Facebook page listed goals such as defending the ummah and liberating it from dictatorship and aggression; co-operating to establish Islamic governance, and working to unite the ummah and bring about its "renaissance". Mohammed al-Sukni, Liwaa al-Umma's commander in Homs, said "I would like to see Syria with a moderate Islamic government – something like Tunisia or Turkey". Abdelmajid al-Khatib, the group's political organizer, said that Liwaa al-Umma plan to transform into a political party once the Assad government is overthrown. He said "we envisage a party that will accept all factions, religions, and sects in Syria, including Alawites, but with an Islamic frame of reference" and added, "we want to be part of any transitional government".

== Funding ==
Liwaa al-Umma was well-funded compared to other Syrian rebel groups, with most of its uniforms and weapons having been bought in Turkey. Harati claimed that the group's funds come from a network of private donors from throughout Syria, the Middle East, and North Africa, with several named benefactors from Kuwait receiving particular praise on the group's Facebook page.

== See also ==
- List of armed groups in the Syrian Civil War
