= Abdullah Senussi =

Head of Libyan Military Intelligence

- Senussi in the 2000s

Personal details
- Born: 5 December 1949 (age 76) Tripoli, Libya
- Spouse: Fatima Farkash (m. 1980)
- Relatives: Mohammed Abdullah al-Senussi (son), Safia Farkash (sister-in-law)
- Occupation: Head of Libyan Military Intelligence

Military service
- Allegiance: (Libya) Libyan Arab Jamahiriya
- Branch/service: Libyan Army
- Rank: Major General
- Battles/wars: Yom Kippur War (1973) Chadian–Libyan War (1978–1987) First Libyan Civil War

Abdullah Senussi (Arabic: عبد الله السنوسي) (/əbˈdʌlə ɑːl səˈnuːsi/ əb-DUL-ə ahl sə-NOO-see) is a Libyan national who was the intelligence chief and brother-in-law of former Libyan leader Colonel Muammar Gaddafi. He was married to Gaddafi's sister-in-law.

In June 1996, he was involved in the Abu Salim prison massacre.

In 1999, he was sentenced in absentia by a French court to life imprisonment for the 1989 bombing of UTA Flight 772. And an international arrest warrant was issued against him.

In 2011, Scottish police officers planned to interview him in connection with the Lockerbie bombing.

== Gaddafi government ==
According to The Guardian, Senussi has had a reputation for evolving Libya's military since the 1970s. During the 1980s he was head of internal security in Libya, at a time when many opponents of Gaddafi were killed. Later, he was described as the head of military intelligence, but it is unclear whether he actually held an official rank. He was also thought to have been behind an alleged plot in 2003 to assassinate Crown Prince Abdullah of Saudi Arabia.

After Senussi's marriage to Gaddafi's wife's sister in the 1979, he entered the elite circle of Libya's leader and assumed various roles including Deputy Chief of the External Security Organization.

US embassy cables described him as being a confidant of Gaddafi who made "many of his medical arrangements". He was known to seek Gaddafi's approval at any cost, even if it went against his morals and beliefs.

== 2011 Libyan civil war ==
During the 2011 Libyan civil war, he was blamed for orchestrating killings in the city of Benghazi. He was believed to have extensive business interests in Libya.

On 1 March 2011, Libya's Quryna newspaper reported that Gaddafi had sacked him. However, in the summer of 2011, there was for the first time a new position in Libya that was created for him, the position was General Chief of Intelligence Services and was given a general rank.

On 16 May 2011, the International Criminal Court prosecutor sought an arrest warrant for Senussi on charges of crimes against humanity.

On 21 July 2011, Libyan opposition sources claimed that Senussi had been killed in an attack by armed rebels in Tripoli; however, a few hours later the same sources recanted on their earlier claim and some said he might have just been injured.

On 30 August 2011, there were reports that both Senussi's son, Mohammed Abdullah al-Senussi, and Muammar Gaddafi's son, Khamis, were killed during clashes with NATO and NTC forces in Tarhuna. Some initial reports falsely claimed that Abdullah Senussi had died as well. After the Battle of Tripoli, Senussi evaded capture and met Muammar Gaddafi and Mutassim Gaddafi in Sirte, but later left to inform his wife that their son had been killed. In October, Arrai TV, a pro-Gaddafi network in Syria, confirmed that Khamis Gaddafi had been killed on 29 August and reported that Mohammed Senussi was killed that day as well.

On 20 October, Niger Foreign Minister Mohamed Bazoum told Reuters that he had fled to Niger. However, a Libyan fighter later told the Guardian that the rebels had the possession of three other men who were in Gaddafi's convoy when he was killed and that he believed one of them was Senussi. The other two were identified as Gaddafi's slain son Mutassim and one of his military commanders Mansour Dhao, who was still alive and confirmed his identity, as well as details of Gaddafi's death, to Human Rights Watch while in the hospital; Dhao was earlier thought to have fled to Niger.

Later reports surfaced that Senussi from his hideout in Niger was helping Saif al-Islam Gaddafi escape from Libya. Senussi was reportedly captured on 20 November near the city of Sabha. It was afterwards reported that he would be taken to Tripoli to stand trial for charges of crimes against humanity, according to the National Transitional Council. However, ICC chief prosecutor Luis Moreno Ocampo doubted Senussi was captured. Libyan defense minister Osama Jweli also stated that there was no evidence Senussi had been captured. On 4 December 2011, Abdullah Nakir, a Libyan official, told Al Arabiya that Senussi was arrested and was being questioned about a secret nuclear facility Gaddafi was operating, but admitted that the Libyan government was unable to produce any photographs of him in custody.

== Arrest and legal cases ==
On 16 March 2012, news reports stated that Senussi had been arrested at Nouakchott airport in Mauritania. The Libyan government was reported as having requested his extradition to Libya.

In September 2012, Lebanese foreign minister Adnan Mansour and a Lebanese judge questioned him on the fate of Imam Musa Sadr to which he admitted that the Imam was killed after a heated argument with Gaddafi, and it was Saeed Rashed who carried out the killing as always.

On 5 September 2012, Mauritania extradited Senussi to Libyan authorities. A trial against Senussi for crimes he allegedly committed during the time he was a close assistant to Gaddafi started in Libya. On the grounds that Senussi's case was being tried in Libyan courts, the International Criminal Court (ICC) concluded its case against Senussi in July 2014.

In September 2013, Senussi's daughter, Anoud, was kidnapped after serving a 10-month sentence for using a forged passport. Libyan security forces later admitted being behind the kidnapping and claimed that it was for her "own protection."

In July 2015, Senussi was sentenced to death by a Libyan court. Mass protests broke out in Sabha and Brak to protest the sentence and members of Senussi's Magarha tribe threatened to turn off water supply from the Great Man-Made River to Tripoli, unless the sentence was overturned. The case was under appeal as of October 2015. As of 9 May 2018, the ICC continued to monitor the progress of the Libyan legal proceedings against Senussi.

In June 2017, Haitham Tajouri’s Tripoli Revolutionaries’ Brigade seized al-Hadba prison and relocated Senussi to the Radisson Blu Al Mahary Hotel Tripoli, where he was sighted having a Iftar meal with his family and members of his Magarha tribe.

In March 2019, twenty family member and members of Senussi's tribe, the Magarha, called for Senussi to be released on the basis of medical problems and "to contribute to and consolidate national reconciliation".

In December 2020, families of victims of Irish Republican Army bombings demanded the British Home Secretary Priti Patel to extradite Senussi to the United Kingdom.

In August 2021, gunmen stormed several water distribution centers and gave the authority 72 hours to release Senussi from detention.

As of July 2022, Senussi was in the custody of the RADA Special Deterrence Forces as Prime Minister Abdul Hamid Dbeibah negotiated with Senussi's Magarha tribe about his potential release from prison.

In December 2022, Abdul Hamid Dbeibah stated that Libya did not intend to extradite Senussi to the United States. It was alleged that his extradition was halted due to public anger after the extradition of another ex-senior Libyan intelligence operative, Mohammed Abouagela Masud, to the United States.

On 13 January 2025, Halima Ibrahim Abdulrahman, minister of Justice in the Government of National Unity (Libya), denied rumours about Senussi's forthcoming release for health reasons.
