= Ireland–Libya relations =

History of international relations

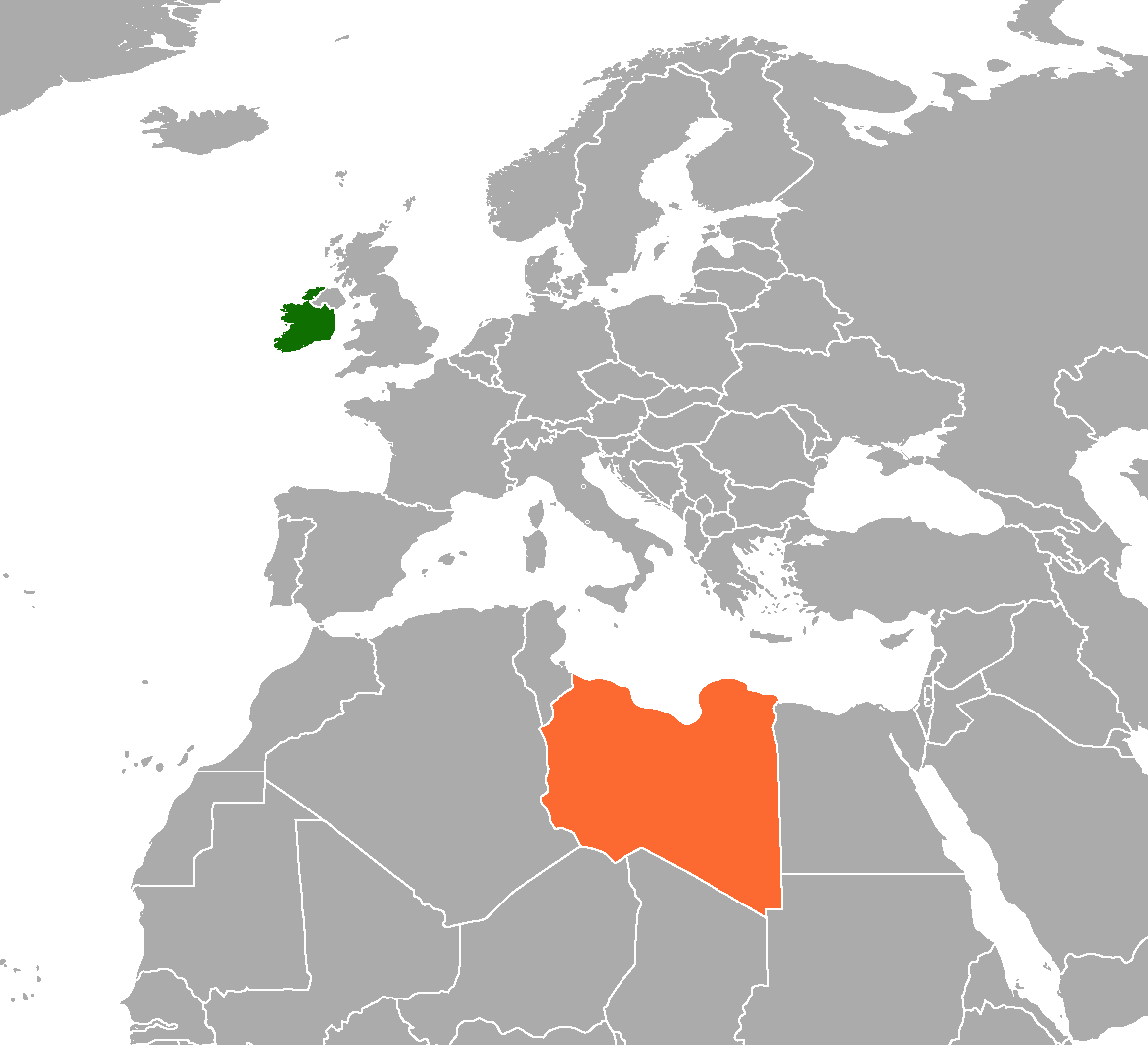

- Ireland: Libya

Ireland–Libya relations began in 1977. Ireland is accredited to Libya from its embassy in Rome, Italy after closing the embassy in Tripoli due to civil war. Libya is accredited to Ireland from its embassy in London, United Kingdom.

In 2013 Libya planned to open an embassy in Dublin

== Relations under Muammar Gaddafi ==
Under Muammar Gaddafi, the prime minister of Libya from 1969 to 2011, relations between both countries were strained due to Gaddafi's support of the Provisonal Irish Republican Army. Gaddafi was sympathetic to their cause and also wanted revenge for the US Air Force's bombing attacks on Tripoli and Benghazi in 1986. In late 1987 French authorities stopped a merchant vessel, the MV Eksund, which was delivering a 150-ton Libyan arms shipment to the IRA. When the Troubles were raging in Northern Ireland, three ships of the Irish Naval Service intercepted a ship carrying weapons from Libya which were probably destined for Irish Republican paramilitaries. Between 1984 and 1987 Libya sent the IRA about 1,000 AK47 assault rifles and six tonnes of Semtex explosive alongside other weapons. This shipment ensured The Troubles could continue for many more years, mainly until the Good Friday Agreement of 1998 ended the conflict. In 1976 after a series of bombings by the Provisional IRA, Gaddafi announced that "the bombs which are convulsing Britain and breaking its spirit are the bombs of Libyan people. We have sent them to the Irish revolutionaries so that the British will pay the price for their past deeds".

In 2011, there was an attempt by Unionists to gain compensation from Libya for casualties persevered to be caused by Libyan arms on the part of the IRA. Libyan officials, in order to get UN sanctions lifted, provided information about arms given to the IRA.

=== Beef trade ===
Under Charles Haughey the Irish government made trade delegations to ensure that the lucrative beef trade would remain open between the two countries.

=== League of Ireland ===
In December 1989, future Ireland manager, Brian Kerr brought a joint St. Patrick's Athletic/Bohemians representative team, travelled to play Al-Ahly in the March 28 Stadium.

=== First Libyan civil war ===
When anti-Gaddafi Libyan rebels took Tripoli in August 2011, the Irish minister for Foreign affairs and leader of the Irish Labour party, Eamon Gilmore urged Muammar Gaddafi to step down as leader of the country. He also said that "Ireland would do all it could to help the reconstruction and redevelopment efforts in the country" and met with representatives of the rebel National Transitional Council and declared that they were the only authority in Libya. After Gaddafi's death, Gilmore said that it brought an end to a "sad and bloody chapter" of Libyan history.

== Relations post-Gaddafi ==
On the 29th of April 2023, the Dáil Éireann voted in favour of deploying a ship from the Irish navy to enforce a U.N arms embargo (only allowing arms to be given to the Government of National Accord and not Libyan warlords).

On the 4th of April 2024, it was exposed that the Offaly-based company Irish training solutions was giving military training to soldiers (using ex-Irish servicemen) in a Libyan warlord's (Khalifa Haftar) army. This broke the U.N arms embargo agreements. The Irish company had signed a 9 month contract with Haftar and received €300 a day, in return they trained them in sniping, close-quarters combat, and also supplied them with helmets and body armour. The Irish Tánaiste (Micheál Martin) and said that the revelations were "deeply shocking" and the Irish government launched an investigation into the situation.
