= Zawiyat al-Dahmani =

Suburb of Tripoli, Libya

Coordinates: 32.89551°N 13.20432°E

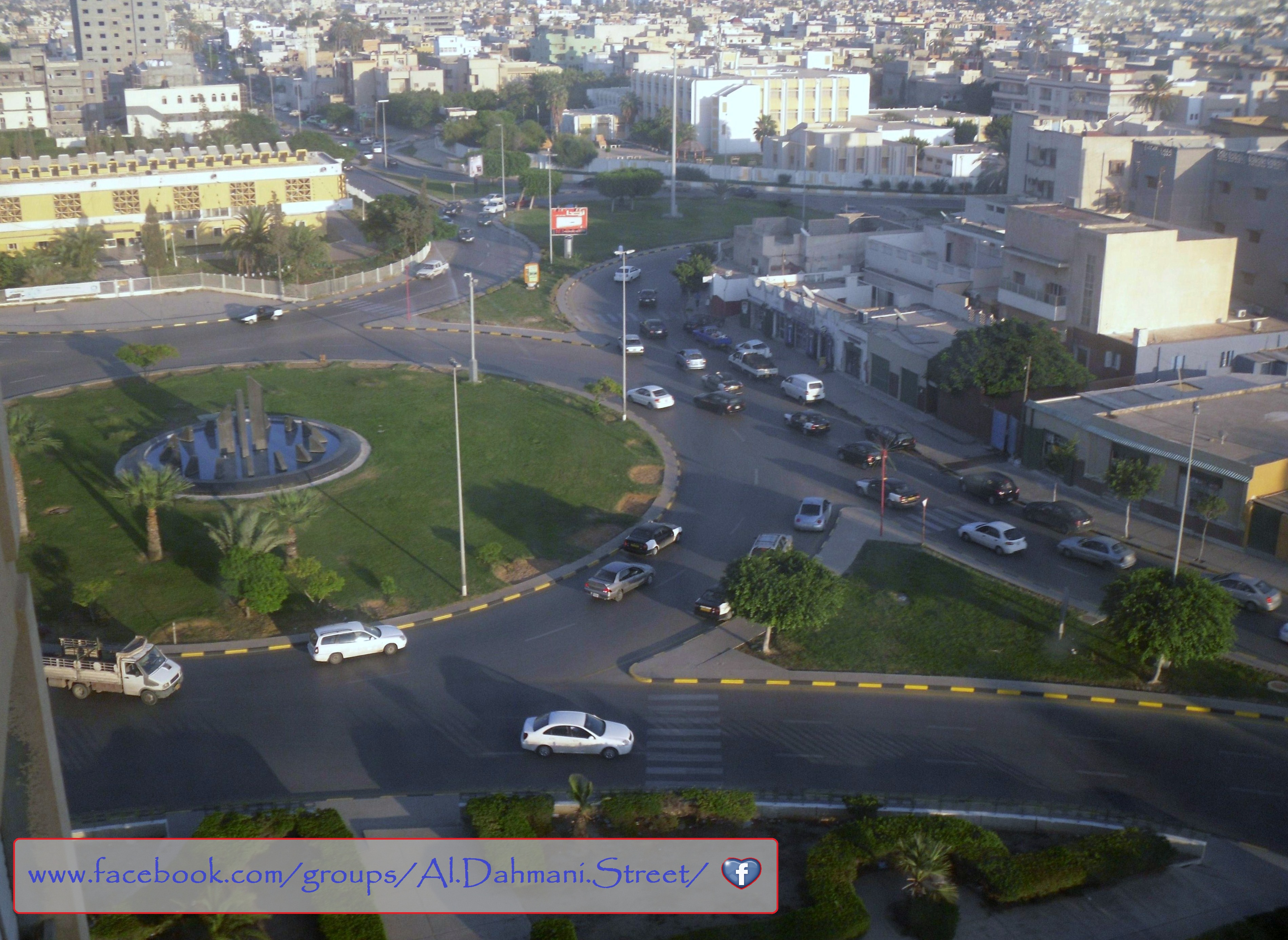

Zawiyat al-Dahmani is a suburb of Tripoli, Libya. It lies between the coast to the north, and the suburb of Fashloom to the south. In the past, in this place there was a village called Shar al-Shatt, in which took place the Battle and massacre at Shar al-Shatt during the Italo-Turkish War.

As of 22 February 2011, during the Libyan Civil War, there were reports that it had been cordoned off by Libyan security forces. At the beginning of the Battle of Tripoli, Al Jazeera reported that Zawiyat al-Dahmani was under the opposition control.
