= Mahdi al-Harati =

Irish-Libyan politician (born c. 1973)

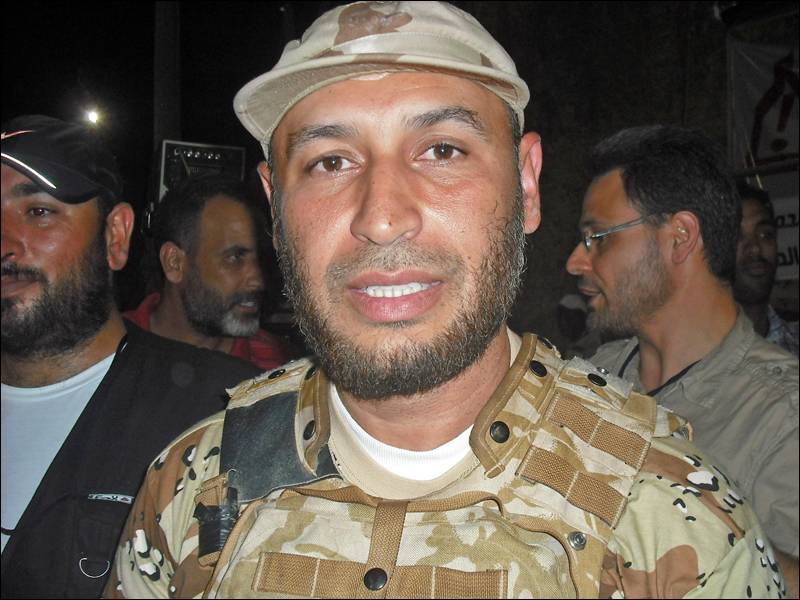
- Mahdi Al-Harati in September 2011, after the Battle of Tripoli

Mayor of Tripoli
- In office June 2014 – 20 August 2015
- Preceded by: Sadat Al Badri
- Succeeded by: Abdul-Rahman Al-Ghillai (acting)

Personal details
- Born: c. 1973 (age 52–53) Tripoli, Libya

Military service
- Allegiance: (Libya) National Transitional Council (2011) (Syria) Syrian National Council (2012)
- Branch/service: (Libya) National Liberation Army
- Rank: Commander/Colonel
- Commands: Tripoli Brigade; Liwaa al-Umma
- Conflicts: Libyan Civil War; Syrian Civil War

Mahdi al-Harati (Arabic: المهدي الحاراتي, born c. 1973) is an Irish-Libyan politician and former co-commander of the Tripoli Brigade during the Libyan Civil War. He was also the commander of Liwaa Al-Umma, a militant group fighting against the Syrian government in the Syrian civil war.

Before the Libyan civil war he was an Arabic teacher in Dublin, where he lived with his Irish-born wife and family.

He was described by Volkskrant, a Dutch daily newspaper, as being a face of the Battle of Tripoli and one of the most important rebel commanders of the Libyan civil war. The Sunday Times, a British newspaper, offered a first-hand account of Al-Mahdi's advance on Tripoli and his men's assault on Gaddafi's former residence, Bab Al-Azizia. He was appointed second in command of the newly formed Tripoli Military Council.

On 11 October 2011, Al-Harati resigned as deputy head of the Tripoli Military Council, amid tensions over security in the capital. According to the Irish Times, while Al-Harati's associates in Tripoli assured that the resignation was for "personal reasons", a senior NTC official quoted by CNN said that the resignation was because of "differences with the National Transitional Council on the planning of the security of Tripoli". Fathi Al-Wersali, a member of the Tripoli Military Council, stated that Al-Harati would continue as commander of the Tripoli brigade.

Following his involvement in the Libyan civil war al-Harati went on a fact-finding mission to Syria where, following discussions with members of the Syrian opposition, he decided to form the militant group Liwaa Al-Umma. After six months leading Liwaa Al-Umma, Al-Harati left the brigade in September 2012 and handed over its command to the Free Syrian Army.

In 2014, Al-Harati was elected mayor of Libya's capital city of Tripoli.

On 27 February 2017, Al-Harati was the victim of a sectarian attack in which he was arrested in Malta along with two men who attacked him.

== Accusations of Terrorism related Activity ==
Al Harati was placed on a ban list by, UAE, Bahrain, Saudi Arabia, Egypt, and other countries for links to supporting Terrorism and Al Nusra front in Syria and for Terrorism related activities with Links to Qatari sponsorship. The ban list ensued the 2017 Qatar diplomatic crisis which a number of nations cut ties with Qatar for its alleged "financial support of international terrorism".
