= Tripoli protests and clashes (February 2011) =

Unrest in Libya

Coordinates: 32°54′8″N 13°11′9″E

- Part of Libyan civil war (2011)
- Situation as of 1 March Areas controlled by Anti-Gaddafi forces
Date	17–25 February 2011
Location	Tripoli, Libya
Result	Decisive pro-Gaddafi victory: Pro-Gaddafi forces solidify control of the city; All anti-Gaddafi protests crushed; Anti-Gaddafi protesters forced to go underground; Escalation of the Libyan civil war

Belligerents
(Libya) Anti-Gaddafi forces	(Libya) Libyan Arab Jamahiriya foreign support: Mercenaries from Eastern Europe and Sub-Saharan Africa (disputed); Belarus

Casualties and losses
300–700 killed	Unknown

The Tripoli protests and clashes were a series of confrontations between Libyan anti-government demonstrators and forces loyal to Libyan leader Muammar Gaddafi in the capital city of Tripoli that took place in February 2011, at the beginning of the Libyan civil war. During the early days of the uprising, there was significant unrest in the city, but the city remained under the control of the government.

== Background ==
Gaddafi had ruled Libya since overthrowing the Libyan monarchy in 1969. As the Arab Spring caused revolutions in Tunisia and Egypt, which both border Libya, Gaddafi was reportedly still in full control, being the longest-ruling non-royal head of state. However, the protestors wanted democracy, and Libya's corruption perception index in 2010 was 2.2, worse than Tunisia's or Egypt's.

== February clashes ==
On 17 February 2011, it was reported that supporters of the Libyan opposition had taken to the streets and Green Square in Tripoli during the Day of Revolt.

On 20 February, it was claimed that snipers fired on crowds to control Green Square, as protesters started fires at police stations and the General People's Congress building. Reportedly, the state television building was also set on fire on 21 February. On the morning of 21 February, activists claimed that protesters surrounded Gaddafi's Bab al-Aziza compound and were trying to storm it, but were forced back by heavy gunfire that killed up to 80 people. On 22 February, it was stated that the justice ministry at al-Shuhadaa square and the Shaabia headquarters were attacked.

Tripoli's Mitiga International Airport may have been taken by the protesters on 25 February. The Tajura district of Tripoli rose up against control by the Gaddafi government on 25 February. However, it was quickly confronted by government troops who reportedly fired on the protestors and killed 25 of them.

The National Transitional Council formed by the rebels in Benghazi, their interim capital, said through their spokesman Hafiz Ghoga that "we will help liberate other Libyan cities, in particular Tripoli through our national army, our armed forces, of which part have announced their support for the people." Various countries, including the United Kingdom and the United States, were considering creating a no-fly zone under United Nations guidance, which would prevent warplanes being used and mercenaries being flown in. The Russian foreign minister rejected the idea and instead supported sanctions, while the Chinese spokesman said their priority was, "for the violence to end, to avoid casualties and to make constructive efforts to help Libya return to peace and stability" and likewise rejected the no-fly zone. On 1 March, British prime minister David Cameron backtracked from his comments regarding the no-fly zone. Gaddafi's son Saif al-Islam, who is British-educated, accused Cameron of wanting to be a hero, and described Cameron's military threats as "like a joke". He also stated that if military action was taken, "we are ready, we are not afraid."

Gaddafi loyalists remained in control in Tripoli, and on 1 March it was reported that many shops were closed and the few banks that opened had queues outside. Also on 1 March, a convoy of twenty government aid trucks left Tripoli with food and medicine for the rebel-held eastern city of Benghazi.

== Public appearances by Gaddafi ==
On 25 February, Gaddafi made a public speech in Green Square, stating "We will fight them and we will beat them. Sing, dance and prepare yourselves. If needs be, we will open all the arsenals."

== Subsequent attempts at protests ==
=== UNSC Resolution 1973 ===
On the night of 17–18 March, following United Nations Security Council Resolution 1973, more clashes occurred between protesters and pro-Gaddafi forces in Tripoli in several different areas. Protests were also planned for 18 March. However, instead, protests against the UN military intervention and in support of Gaddafi's government took place over the coming days.

=== Iman al-Obeidi ===
In late March, postgraduate law student and Gaddafi opponent Iman al-Obeidi was gang-raped by pro-Gaddafi forces in Tripoli, escaped and reported the event to foreign reporters at the Rixos Al Nasr hotel, and was detained and released several times by pro-Gaddafi forces, attracting worldwide support, and giving interviews with the anti-Gaddafi Libya TV and other media in early April.

=== April ===
An anti-Gaddafi street protest took place in the Fashloom suburb of Tripoli on 7 April. At a small anti-Gaddafi protest at dawn on 9 April, the participants released a protest statement. They stated, "These are our streets, and these are our alleys, for we vow to you shameful and disgraceful Gaddafi, not you nor your battalions, nor your snipers, nor your mercenaries however many they are, will not terrify us anymore, and we will not back down on our revolution and up rise no matter how greater the sacrifice."

According to local residents interviewed by Reuters, several attacks by local Tripoli residents against military checkpoints and a police station in Tripoli took place during the first full week of April, with gunfights being heard at night. An exiled anti-Gaddafi Libyan who kept in daily contact with people from the suburb of Tajoura stated, "There have been attacks by Tripoli people and a lot of people have been killed on the Gaddafi army side." Hundreds of young men suspected of being Gaddafi opponents were imprisoned in late March and early April. According to one resident interviewed by Reuters, pro-Gaddafi forces controlled most of the major roads and intersections in the suburbs, while smaller streets deeper in the city's outskirts, like Tajura, were under opposition control.

=== May ===
On 9 May, an opposition newspaper, Brnieq, reported a "full-scale" uprising in the suburbs of the Tripoli by anti-Gaddafi forces who had been supplied with light weapons by defecting security forces. Protesters planned to head towards the centre of the city. A Libyan official denied the report and said that it was peaceful in Tripoli. Reuters correspondent in the center of the city heard no gunfire. The following day, Al Jazeera reported that opposition members had hoisted their flag at the Mitiga air base in eastern Tripoli before withdrawing. On 13 May, there were anti-government protests again.

Al Jazeera English reported on 30 May that "unprecedented protests" occurred in Tripoli. Large demonstrations such as those had previously been limited by the heavy security presence, indicating the growing boldness of the populace of Tripoli. The protesters were eventually dispersed by live fire from security forces.

=== June ===
By June, there were ongoing guerrilla attacks on military checkpoints in the city.

=== August ===
Rebels made significant military advances from their stronghold in the Nafusa Mountains, taking large parts of the coastal town of Zawiya, roughly 50 kilometres (31 miles) west of Tripoli, seizing parts of the Libyan Coastal Highway, preventing military supplies and fuel reaching Tripoli from Tunisia. They also claimed to have seized Gharyan to the south, cutting off supplies to Tripoli from there also, seemingly in an attempt to cut off, and then besiege, the capital. On 20 August, it was reported that the Battle of Tripoli had started and that heavy gunfire and explosions were occurring in parts of the city, and that clashes were ongoing in the eastern suburb of Tajoura. Text messages were sent out to Tripoli residents by the government, demanding they go out to the streets to fight against "agents with weapons".
