= Magarha =

Ethnic group

المقارحة
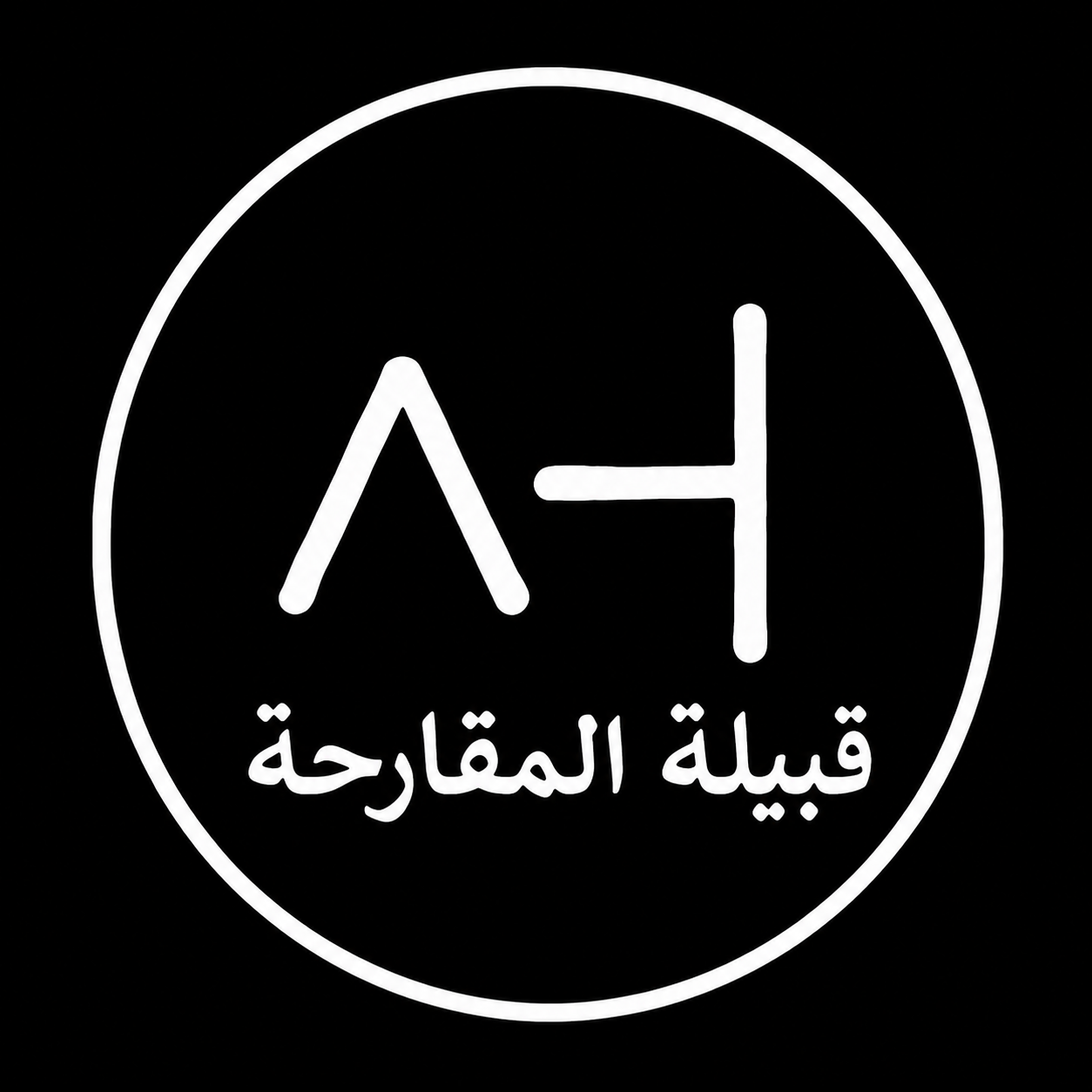
- Emblem of the Magarha tribe

Regions with significant populations
- Fezzan, Tripolitania

Languages
- Arabic

Religion
- Islam

Related ethnic groups
- Banu Sulaym

The Magarha are a tribe found mainly in the Fezzan province in the western parts of Libya.

The Magarha (also al-Magarha, Meqariha) (Arabic: المقارحة) is one of the major Arab tribes of Libya. They originate from Fezzan province of Libya and have been an influential supporters and beneficiaries of Muammar Gaddafi during his long rule and then Libya's 2011 civil war. Some Magarha have relocated to Sirte and elsewhere along the coast.

After the Warfalla tribe which is Libya's largest, the Magarha are Libya's second largest tribe with an estimated 1 million members.

The Magarha, along with the Warfalla, have long formed an important alliance with Muammar Gaddafi, with many Magarha located in the upper ranks of Libya's government and security forces. Abdullah Senussi, Muammar Gaddafi's brother-in-law and the chief of military intelligence, is a Magarha.

== History ==
The Magarha tribe has been semi-nomadic, and their alliances are mentioned in historical texts. The 14th century Islamic texts suggest that the Magarha were one of the tribes that controlled the oases and palm groves in the region that is contemporary west Libya. Their rights were acknowledged in the 16th to 18th century Barbary Corsairs era.

The historical records of the Ottoman Empire suggest that along with Riyyah tribe, the Magarha were Arab tribes of Wadi al-Shatti region, and that they supported the Ottoman's authority in Fezzan region. In exchange for this support, the Ottoman Empire had exempted them from taxes, allowed them to collect a tribute from passing caravans and represented the Ottoman interests as its police force.

== Notable Margarha ==
- Abdullah al-Senussi – former Libyan intelligence chief, brother-in-law of Muammar Gaddafi
- Abdelbaset al-Megrahi (1952-2012) – Libyan officer convicted of the bombing of Pan Am Flight 103 over Lockerbie
- Abdessalam Jalloud – Libyan politician, Prime Minister 1972-1977
- Mohammed Abdullah al-Senussi – Libyan military commander, son of Abdullah Senussi

== See also ==
- Demographics of Libya
- Politics of Libya
