= Abu Oweis =

Libyan Army commander

- Born: Libya
- Military career
- Allegiance: Libya
- Branch: (Libya) National Liberation Army
- Service years: 2011 - present
- Rank: Deputy Commander
- Unit: Tripoli Brigade
- Conflicts: 2011 Libyan civil war * Battle of Tripoli

Abu Oweis is the founder and deputy commander of the Qatari-trained Tripoli Brigade in the 2011 Libyan civil war.
