= Tripoli Brigade =

Libyan military unit

Tripoli Revolutionaries Brigade
- كتيبة ثوار طرابلس
- Active: April 2011– December 2018; 2022
- Country: Libya
- Allegiance: National Transitional Council
- Branch: National Liberation Army
- Role: Militia
- Size: 1,300 (2012); 5000 (2017); 150-300 (2023)
- Garrison/HQ: Tripoli
- Patron: Qatar; United Kingdom; NATO (alleged; disputed)
- Engagements: First Libyan Civil War; 2011 Nafusa Mountain Campaign; 2011 Libyan rebel coastal offensive; Battle of Tripoli; Second Libyan Civil War; 2022 Tripoli clashes

Commanders
- Current commander: Haithem al-Tajouri
- Notable commanders: Mahdi al-Harati; Abdelhakim Belhaj; Abu Oweis

The Tripoli Revolutionaries Brigade, also known as the Free Tripoli Guardian, was a Libyan rebel group formed during the First Libyan Civil War that merged into the Tripoli Protection Force. Originally formed in April 2011 in the opposition stronghold of Benghazi, it later relocated to the Nafusa Mountains, then the closest frontline to Tripoli, before advancing into the city itself in August.

In November 2011, the brigade began taking measures to disband and integrate itself more with the NTC-led new national army, the brigade announced over its Twitter account.

== Commanders ==
The brigade's Commander-in-Chief is Libyan-Irish citizen Mahdi al-Harati, Khalid Abozakkar is deputy commander and co founder in [Nalut], and Abu Oweis is deputy commander. Muhammad Tabouni is the brigade's General Commander. Col Abdul Latif is the commander of Seraai al-Hamra, one of the four sub-brigades of the overall Tripoli Brigade.

== Foundation ==
In February 2011 Mahdi al-Harati travelled from Ireland to Benghazi and began to create a well-organised group that could fight in the western provinces of Libya. He gathered 15 highly educated men, all of whom had extensive expertise and skills. The proposal for a Tripoli revolutionary brigade was put before the Benghazi-based National Transitional Council, and was immediately approved. Within days the Tripoli Brigade had 150 recruits. They received basic military training before transferring to the mountains in the western provinces. By August 2011, the brigade had 570 men from all over the country within its ranks.

The brigade started with a core group of 15 men, but grew within days to 150, during the training period in Zintan and Nalut numbers swelled to 470, and was recorded at 570 at Zawiya. During the assault to enter Tripoli the brigade was reported in the UK Telegraph newspaper to number just under 1,000. On 30 August the brigade had swelled to 1300 fighters in Tripoli. Its General commander also stated that it had troops waiting to join once the brigade entered Tripoli.

The majority of the brigade's volunteer fighters are from Tripoli, or nearby towns and villages, and know the city streets well, making them prime candidates for taking the city. Based in Nalut University, the brigade numbers about 1300 armed fighters. The brigade saw action throughout the 2011 Nafusa Mountains Campaign including in the towns of Nalut, Bir Ghanem and Tiji, in combat against loyalist forces.

Due to the threat of perceived reprisals against the families of Tripoli brigade soldiers, their faces must be covered, at least when being filmed by journalists. Many of the brigade's members were involved during the 2011 Tripoli clashes in February, and fled the capital to avoid loyalist forces, and then regrouped in later months to form the Tripoli Brigade, with the ultimate goal of advancing out of the Nafusa Mountain range, and to the capital.

The brigade has several officers who have lived most of their lives in English speaking countries including Ireland, Canada, UK and the US. This proved vital with co-ordination with NATO and also in interviews and interaction with western media. The Brigade has an English language Facebook page.

== Training ==
Although the Brigade is not an elite force, its Nalut headquarters was described by AP news agency as 'high tech'. It did receive communications equipment and three-week's urban warfare training from Qatari special forces in the Nafusa mountains. It is noted for its extreme training; during which recruits woke at 5:30 a.m. for a 45-minute run, followed by daylong marching and weapons training. The brigade has also created an eight-man urban sniper unit. The brigade is often referred to as an elite brigade by the National Transitional Council and the media. This is not an accurate description as very few are professional soldiers. In a media interview in Tripoli, Commander Harati said his battalion is not an elite armed force and that it is "important to understand that we are all civilians. We are not the military". The enrolling register counts many professionals among its members including doctors, businessmen, mechanics, engineers, and web designers.

== Battle of Tripoli ==
Their main aim, once in control of Tripoli, was to control and protect strategic locations, infrastructure and other important sites. On 20 August, a large uprising broke out in Tripoli, with rebel forces speeding towards the capital from the west and the east. The Tripoli Brigade was the spearhead of the rebel fighters assault on Tripoli. In a 32 kilometer push launched at dawn, the Tripoli Brigade reached the suburbs of Tripoli by early afternoon following a non-stop artillery shelling of advancing rebel troops. In response a large anti-aircraft artillery piece fired rounds at loyalist troops. The Tripoli Brigade took a key military base and the 27th bridge, a gateway to the capital, just a day after defeating loyalist troops in Zawiya.

Divided into four battalions the Brigade attacked the capital from three directions. The only impediment to a rush into the capital was on another front line, outside the town of Azizia, the Tripoli Brigade and allies from the western mountain forces were ordered to hold back while the alliance carried out heavy bombing raids on loyalist positions there.

The Tripoli Brigade were reported to be the first revolutionaries to enter the city and the first to enter the main Green Square, that was renamed Martyr Square.

On entering Tripoli the Tripoli Brigade took command of the Women's police training centre as their headquarters. The Tripoli Brigade, alongside rebel forces from Misrata, were also the first to punch through the main gates of Gaddafi's former residence, Bab al Azizia.

The UK Daily Telegraph reported of the brigade "The rebels pushing into Tripoli are young professionals fighting to establish a very different country from the dictatorship founded well before they were born".

France 24 TV channel had a reporter travelling with the Tripoli Brigade during the final assault on the capital. It reported that the brigade lost sixty fighters during the first 48 hours in Tripoli.

The Tripoli brigade were front-line troops during the taking of Colonel Gaddafi's famous residential compound, Bab al Azizia. Officers from the Tripoli Brigade were reported as leading the attack. The Misrata Brigade with heavier trucks and artillery guns broke the perimeter of the compound and the Tripoli Brigade provided the infantry that flooded through the breached walls. An English reporter quoted in the Irish Times spoke of the Commander-in-chief 'rallying the troops' during the storming at the compound. The brigade's website reported that its media team had to take up rifles during this attack in which they took 100 prisoners.

=== Activities after the Battle of Tripoli ===
In the weeks after the fall of the Gaddafi Government in Tripoli the brigade took a major role in the securing the city and clearing it of the few remaining pockets of resistance. The commander of the brigade was appointed second in command of the newly formed Tripoli Military council. This council's aim is to unify the country's various armed brigades. Mahdi al-Harati said that Khamis Gaddafi was killed after a military battle with Tripoli Military Council forces between the villages of Taruna and Bani Walid. The battleground is in north-west Libya, near Misrata. He stated Khamis was taken to a hospital where he died from his injuries. He was then reportedly buried in the area by rebel forces. There was no independent evidence to support the claim.

The brigade has been guarding Tripoli's airports, as well as the hotels of foreign journalists and diplomats since they took the city.

On 5 October, a new batch of recruits successfully graduated and became part of the Tripoli Brigade. The same day, the head of the brigade announced that two mass graves had been uncovered in and around Tripoli containing up 900 bodies of Gaddafi's opponents.

On 10 October, members of the Kekka Brigade from Zintan, attempted to surround some of the Tripoli Brigade, after a heated argument over who should police Tripoli and attempted to prevent them from leaving the area. Tripoli Brigade reinforcements arrived and convinced the Kekka brigade to withdraw, preventing any armed clashes breaking out.

Fighting broke out on 31 October between the Tripoli Brigade and a brigade from Zintan when the Zintanians attempted to enter a hospital and kill a patient they had shot earlier in the day. Tripoli Brigade guards prevented them from doing so and a firefight broke out which left two dead and seven wounded,

Members of the brigade also volunteered to join the side of the anti-Assad rebels in Syria during the Syrian civil war in 2012.

== Noted members ==
The brigade's Commander-in-Chief is a Libyan-Irish citizen Colonel Mahdi al-Harati. He was described by the Dutch daily newspaper Volkskrant as being a face of the battle of Tripoli and one of the most important commanders in the National Liberation Army. Deputy chief of Tripoli Military Council. He resigned from his post in November 2011.

Abu Oweis acts as deputy commander.

Issam Shabaan, the son of Gaddafi's first defence minister, Mohammad Shabaan, is the NATO liaison with the Brigade.

Col. Abdul Latif, is the commander of Seraai al-Hamra, one of the four brigades.

Husam Najjair, Head of Security. Irish born relative of the Brigade's Commander-in-Chief.

The brigade's physical trainer is a former soccer player from a club in Munich.
