= Abdullah Al-Mayhoub =

Libyan lawyer (1955–2012)

Abdullah Moussa Al-Mayhoub (Arabic: عبد الله موسى الميهوب), also known as Abdelallah Moussa El-myehoub, was a member of the Libyan National Transitional Council representing the city of Al Qubah. He received a Doctor of Philosophy from a university in France and previously served as Dean of the law school at Benghazi University.
