= Fashlum =

District in Tripoli, Libya

Coordinates: 32°54′8″N 13°11′9″E

Fashloom فشلوم
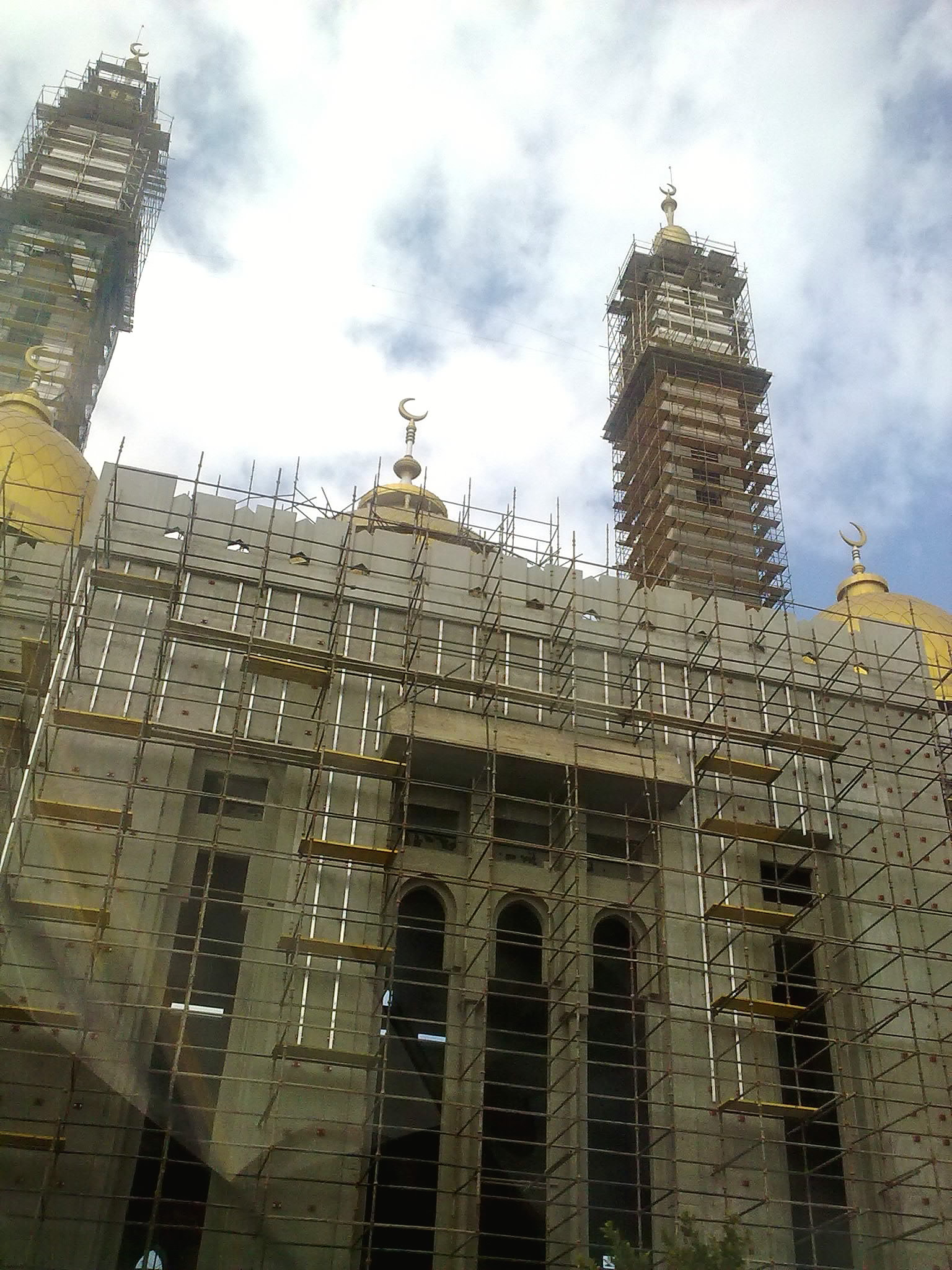
- Fashloom amora mosque
- Interactive map of Fashloom
- Country: Libya

Government
  - Type: Municipality

The Fashloom district is a suburb of Tripoli, Libya. It lies inland to the south of the suburb of Zawiyat al-Dahmani, and southeast of the Martyrs' Square. It is one of the more impoverished districts of the city.

On 22 February 2011, during the Libyan Civil War, there were reports that it had been cordoned off by Libyan security forces. An anti-Gaddafi street protest took place in Fashloom on 7 April. Participants' faces were hidden with scarves and they held anti-Gaddafi banners. A protester read out a statement of support for anti-Gaddafi forces and stated, "We are demonstrating yet again after we sacrificed hundreds of martyrs."

At the beginning of Battle of Tripoli, Al-Jazeera reported that Fashloom was under the opposition control.
