= Muhajirin wa-Ansar Alliance =

Alliance active during the Syrian Civil War

Muhajirin wa-Ansar Alliance تحالف المهاجرين والأنصار
- Official logo of Muhajirin wa-Ansar Alliance
- Dates active: January 2014 – 2015
- Groups: Jund al-Aqsa; Liwa al-Haqq; Liwaa al-Umma; Omar Brigade
- Active regions: Hama Governorate, Syria; Idlib Governorate, Syria
- Ideology: Salafi jihadism
- Size: 7,000
- Wars: Syrian Civil War

The Muhajirin wa-Ansar Alliance (Arabic: تحالف المهاجرين والأنصار, Alliance of Emigrants and Helpers) was an alliance of Salafi jihadist groups that were active during the Syrian Civil War. The groups involved were: Jund al-Aqsa (former), Liwaa al-Umma, the Omar Brigade and the Haqq Brigade in Idlib. Two prominent members of the alliance, Jund al-Aqsa and Haqq Brigade in Idlib, became part of the Army of Conquest operations room in 2015, entering into a strategic relationship with al-Nusra Front. Jund al-Aqsa later left the Army of Conquest.

== See also ==
- List of armed groups in the Syrian Civil War
