= Zeina Khodr =

Lebanese journalist

Zeina Khodr (Arabic: زينة خضر) is a Lebanese broadcast journalist for the Al Jazeera English channel.

== Career ==
Khodr has been a news correspondent, in national and international news, for over 15 years. She has worked for several news organizations, including: Al Jazeera's online, Arabic-language and English services, Munhwa Broadcasting Corporation (MBC), Emirates Dubai Television, the BBC World Service, and CNN.

Khodr has worked for Al Jazeera English since it launched, in 2006. After reporting from Pakistan and Afghanistan, she came to international prominence as one of the first correspondents to enter Tripoli in 2011.

Now a senior correspondent for the Near East, Khodr reports from the Lebanon, Syria and Turkey. Though not styled a war correspondent, her permanent presence on the ground, in a region of continual unrest, ensures a regular place on the front-line of conflict; her reports are frequently made in protective flak jacket and combat helmet, and often to a background of gunfire.

== Awards ==
- 2011: Sky Women in Film and TV Awards (WFTV UK): 'the ITV Achievement of the Year Award', for her coverage of the Fall of Tripoli.
- 2013: Monte-Carlo Television Festival: a nominee for the prestigious [Jury] News award.

== Personal ==
Khodr was educated at the American Community School (ACS), in Beirut, and at the American University of Beirut, where she earned her BA in political science in 1994.
