= Ahmed Al-Abbar =

Libyan businessman

Ahmed Al-Abbar (Arabic: أحمد العبار) is a member of the Libyan National Transitional Council in charge of Economics. In this capacity, he is in charge of administering the council's funds and opening lines of credit from other nations. He resides in Benghazi and runs a company that imports agricultural goods, through which his family has business ties to some in the Senussi.
