= Anwar Fituri =

Libyan politician (born 1964)

Anwar Elfeitori أنور الفيتوري
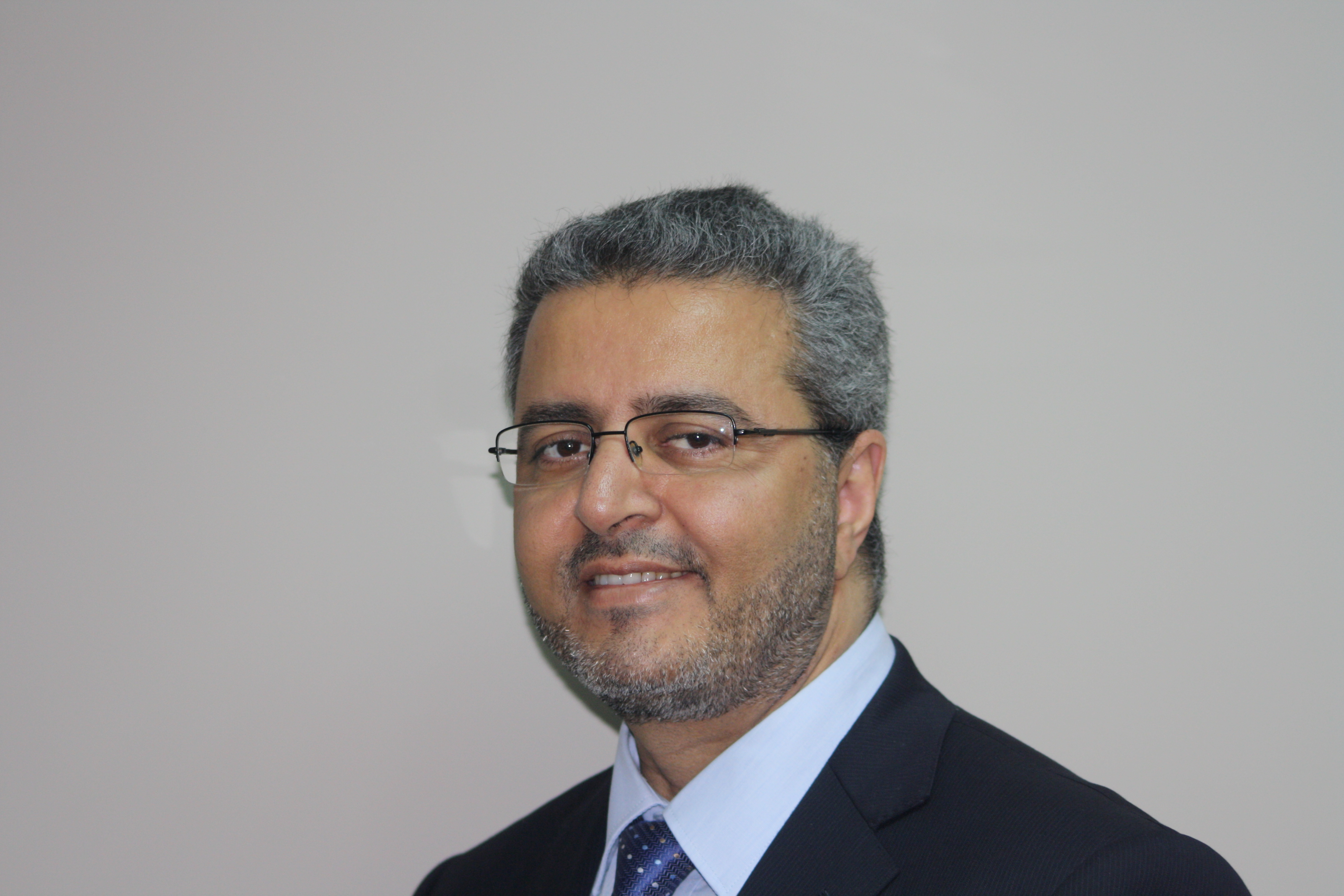

Minister for Communications and Information Technology
- Incumbent
- Assumed office 22 November 2011
- Prime Minister: Abderrahim El-Keib
- Incumbent: Ousama Siala

Personal details
- Born: 1964 (age 61–62) Benghazi, Libya
- Party: Independent
- Education: University of Benghazi; University of Waterloo; University of British Columbia
- Profession: Telecommunications Engineer

Anwar Elfeitori (Arabic: أنور الفيتوري) is a Libyan Telecommunications Engineer born on 1964 in Benghazi, Libya . Elfeitori served as the minister for Transportation and Communication on the executive office of the National Transitional Council, from 10 May 2011 to 22 November 2011. He was named Minister for Communications and Information Technology on 22 November 2011 by Abdurrahim El-Keib.

Most recently Minister Elfeitori signed an agreement with NATO to open parts of the Libyan airspace. Dr. Elfeitori is currently focusing on transporting wounded Libyans who need specialist care. The reopened airspace features routes to and from airports including Tripoli, Misrata, Benghazi, Malta, and Cairo.
