= Mohammed Abdullah al-Senussi =

Libyan military commander

Mohammed Abdullah Senussi
- Born: 1 May 1981; Tripoli, Libya
- Died: 29 August 2011 (aged 30); Near Tarhuna, Libya
- Occupation: geologist
- Parent(s): Abdullah Senussi (father); Fatima Farkash (mother)
- Relatives: Safia Farkash (aunt); Muammar Gaddafi (uncle) Cousins (7): Saif al-Islam Gaddafi; Al-Saadi Gaddafi; Mutassim Gaddafi; Hannibal Gaddafi; Ayesha Gaddafi; Saif al-Arab Gaddafi; Khamis Gaddafi

Mohammed Abdullah Senussi (1 May 1981 – 29 August 2011) was the son of former Libyan Intelligence chief Abdullah Senussi. He was also known to be the first volunteer to fight against the rebels, and well-known in Libya for shooting down an American fighter jet above Misrata.

On 29 August 2011, he and his cousin Khamis Gaddafi, were killed by a National Transitional Council technical.

== Death ==
He and Khamis had been commanding pro-Gaddafi forces in the 2011 Libyan civil war, especially Khamis, who commanded the Khamis Brigade. Senussi had been retreating after accomplishing what was asked of him by Gaddafi which was destroying the runways of Tripoli International Airport. In the process, he engaged with NATO forces as well as ground troops and proceeded to meet Khamis in the countryside of Tripoli with a convoy after anti-Gaddafi forces had seized control of the Libyan capital, Tripoli, after a battle with Gaddafi loyalists for the city in August.

When the convoy neared the city of Tarhuna, they clashed with NTC fighters resulting in the deaths of both Mohammed Senussi and Khamis Gaddafi. This was initially denied by Gaddafi loyalists. However, on 15 October a Syrian Pro-Gaddafi TV station that had been broadcasting audio messages from Gaddafi and his spokesman since Tripoli was overrun by NTC forces in August, confirmed their deaths, posting pictures of Khamis and Senussi and broadcast verses of the Qur’an saying that "they died fighting enemies of their homeland."
