= Naeem M. Abdurrahman =

Libyan scientist (born 1954)

Naeem Al-Gheriany نعيم عبد الرحمن الغرياني
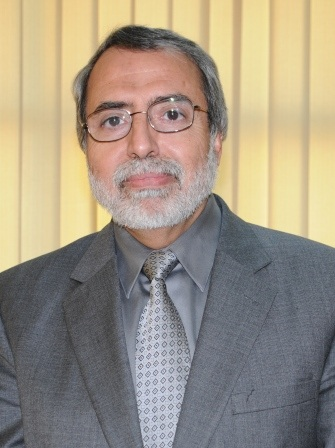

Minister of Higher Education and Scientific Research
- Incumbent
- Assumed office 22 November 2011
- Prime Minister: Abdurrahim El-Keib

Personal details
- Born: April 12, 1954 (age 72) Tripoli, Libya
- Party: Independent
- Education: University of Washington (M.Sc.); Rensselaer Polytechnic Institute (Ph.D.)
- Profession: Nuclear scientist; Engineer

Naeem M. Abdurrahman (a.k.a. Naeem Al-Gheriany) (Arabic نعيم عبدالرحمن الغرياني) is a Libyan nuclear scientist, engineer and academic. He was named Libya's minister of higher education and scientific research on 22 November 2011 by Prime Minister Abdurrahim El-Keib.

== Early life ==
Gheriany was born in Tripoli, Libya in 1954 and completed primary and secondary schooling in Tripoli.

== Education ==
In the early 1970s, Gheriany received a scholarship from Libyan government and moved to the United States to pursue his undergraduate study and higher education. He earned a B.Sc. with honors in nuclear engineering and a B.Sc. with honors in engineering physics from the University of Tennessee in Knoxville before returning to Libya in 1978 to work as a teaching assistant at the University of Tripoli. In 1979, Gheriany returned to the United States, where he earned a M.Sc. in nuclear engineering from the University of Washington and a PhD in nuclear science and engineering from Rensselaer Polytechnic Institute in New York. He obtained his Professional Engineer (PE) license from the State Board of Examiners, Hartford CT, shortly thereafter. He also earned an MBA from Washington State University. Since his appointment to the U.S. Department of Energy's Office of Engineering and Technology in 2009, Gheriany has resided in Germantown, MD with his wife, Mariam, and their five children; Sawsan Abdurrahman, Fatima Abdurrahman, Najla Abdurrahman, Sarah Abdurrahman and Omar Abdurrahman.

== Political Involvement ==
Gheriany was an active member of the Libyan opposition to the former regime of Muammar Gaddafi. His political activities began during his undergraduate years in the mid-1970s when he was active among the Libyan students in the US and later participated in the founding of the General Union for the Students of Libya in North America. In the late 1970s he participated in various efforts to organize the Libyan opposition movement abroad, and was a founding member of the National Front for the Salvation of Libya in the early 1980s, and a member of its Permanent Bureau through the 1980s.

Gheriany's activism has spanned several decades and continued throughout the Libyan Civil War, when he acted as a leader of the Libyan-American diaspora and as a Libyan affairs expert to the media. He also acted as a spokesman for the Libyan-American community through several press conferences during the first few months of the revolution that called on the United States and the international community to support the Libyan uprising by recognizing the NTC, condemning the Gaddafi regime and providing aid through international humanitarian organizations to the Libyan people in their time of need. Additionally, Gheriany holds advisory positions for several Libyan organizations, such as The American-Libyan Council and the International Forum for Libyan Experts.

== Career ==
Gheriany's career began as a senior scientist at Advanced Innovative Sciences, where he remained for five years before moving to academia. In 1993, he accepted a position as a professor of nuclear engineering and as the nuclear engineering program director at the University of Texas at Austin. During his time at the University of Texas, Gheriany managed the University of Texas Nuclear Engineering Program. As program director, he improved student enrollment and increased research funding several fold. Additionally, he has published over fifty articles and papers in refereed scientific journals, conference proceedings and technical reports.

After leaving the University of Texas, he took a position as a principal scientist at the Department of Energy's Hanford site for Fluor Corporation and held the same position at CH2M HILL in 2008. In 2009, Dr. Gheriany was appointed to the U.S. Department of Energy's Office of Engineering and Technology. Since 2010, he has held the positions of nuclear scientist within the U.S. Department of Energy Headquarters' Office of Safety and Security and an adjunct professor for the Catholic University of America.

Throughout his career, Gheriany has served on many technical review teams for the US Department of Energy, including design review committees and senior advisory committees. He served as the department lead for National Academy of Science Studies and lead the Office of Safety and Security effort in Nuclear Safety R&D. He has also served as a reviewer for the American Nuclear Society, the International Conference on Nuclear Engineering, the Department of Energy Nuclear Engineering Research Grant Program, the International Conference on the Physics of Nuclear Science and Technology, the U.S. Civilian Research and Development Foundation for the Independent States of the Former Soviet Union Grant Program, the American Society of Engineering Education, and the National Science Foundation. He has also served on panels and teams, at both the national and international level, including the United States/Russian Technical Specialists Team on Water Reactors for Fissile Materials Disposition, the Department of Energy Nuclear Engineering Research Grant Program Review Panel, the National Science Foundation Review Panel, and the Organisation for Economic Co-operation and Development Nuclear Energy Agency Criticality Safety Working Party.
