= Abdul Hafiz Ghoga =

Libyan politician (born 1957)

- عبد الحفيظ غوقة
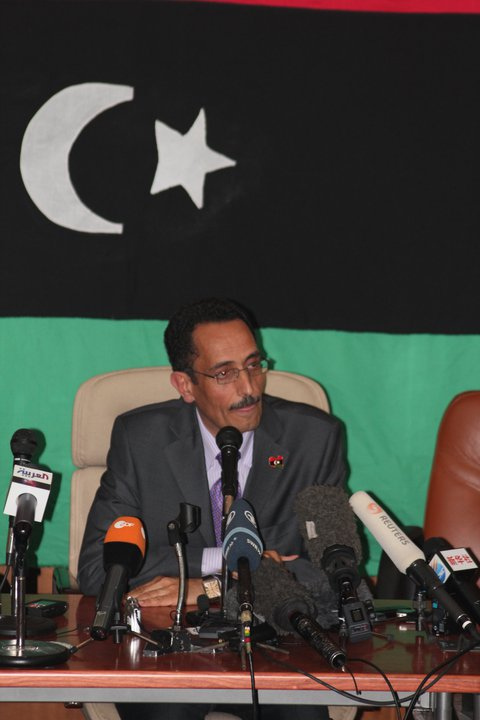

Vice Chairman of the National Transitional Council of Libya
- In office 23 March 2011 – 22 January 2012
- President: Mustafa Abdul Jalil
- Prime Minister: Mahmoud Jibril; Ali Tarhouni (Acting); Abdurrahim El-Keib
- Preceded by: Position established
- Succeeded by: Mustafa Honi

Personal details
- Born: 11 June 1957 (age 69) Al-Azizya, Libya
- Party: Anti-Gaddafi forces

Abdul Hafiz Ghoga (also known as Abdelhafed Abdelkader Ghoga, also spelled Ghogha; Arabic: عبد الحفيظ غوقة; born 11 June 1957) is a Libyan human rights lawyer who rose to prominence as the spokesman for the National Transitional Council, a body formed in Benghazi during the 2011 Libyan civil war. On 23 March 2011, he became the vice chairman of the council, serving in that post until he resigned on 22 January 2012 after protests against him.

== Abu Salim prison massacre ==
Abdul Hafiz Ghoga was actively involved in legal representation for the families of people killed in the 1996 Abu Salim Prison massacre.

== 2011 Libyan civil war ==
Ghoga was a member of the National Transitional Council created during the 2011 Libyan civil war and acted as its spokesperson. Ghoga has argued that the council is working for a unified Libya, rather than letting rebel-controlled areas separate from areas controlled by Muammar Gaddafi; "There is no such thing as a divided Libya".

On 27 February, he said that the council was not seeking foreign intervention. On 20 March, he announced that over 8000 people opposed to Gaddafi had been killed. However, Armed Conflict Location and Event Data Project, which compiles a database of all reported fatalities due to political violence on the African continent, listed 6,109 fatalities from 15 February to 23 October 2011, of which 1,319 prior to NATO intervention. Ghoga criticised a comment by Arab League Secretary-General Amr Moussa that was critical of the way in which the Libyan no-fly zone was implemented. Ghoga stated, "Today, when the secretary general spoke, I was surprised. What is the mechanism that stops the extermination of the people in Libya, what is the mechanism, Mr. Secretary General? If the protection of civilians is not a humanitarian obligation, what is the mechanism that you propose to us?"

== Resignation ==
In January 2012, he resigned as Vice Chairman of the Transitional National Council.
