= Mustafa Rugibani =

Libyan businessman and politician

Mustafa Rugibani مصطفى الرجباني

Labor Minister
- Incumbent
- Assumed office 22 November 2011
- President: Mustafa Abdul Jalil
- Prime Minister: Abdurrahim El-Keib

Personal details
- Party: Independent
- Profession: Businessman; Politician

Mustafa Rugibani (Arabic: مصطفى الرجباني; born 1941) is a Libyan businessman and politician. He was named labor minister on 22 November 2011 by Abdurrahim El-Keib.

Prior to the uprising that toppled the Gaddafi government of Libya, Mr. Rugibani was CEO of MTS in Libya and chairman of United Business Machines, the authorized IBM Business Partner for the entire range of IBM products and services in Jordan.

Mustafa Rugibani was appointed as Ambassador for Libya to the Holy See between 2013 up until 2017.
