= Liwa al-Haqq (Idlib) =

Syrian Islamist rebel group

- لواء الحق بريف إدلب
- Logo of Liwa al-Haqq
- Headquarters: Idlib, Syria
- Active regions: Hama Governorate, Syria; Idlib Governorate, Syria
- Ideology: Salafi Jihadism
- Size: 1,000 (2017)
- Part of: Muhajirin wa-Ansar Alliance; Army of Conquest; Fatah Halab
- Wars: the Syrian Civil War

Liwa al-Haqq (Arabic: لواء الحق بريف إدلب, Right Brigade or Truth Brigade), was a Syrian Islamist rebel group that was active during the Syrian Civil War until joining Hayat Tahrir al-Sham in 2017.

== History ==
On 31 October 2014, amid fighting between al-Nusra and the western-backed Hazzm Movement and Syrian Revolutionaries Front, Liwa al-Haqq along with 13 other rebel groups in Idlib established a peace keeping force to mediate the conflict between al-Nusra and the western backed groups, among the peace keeping factions included Ahrar al-Sham, Jaysh al-Islam, Suqour al-Sham and the Nour al-Din al-Zenki Movement.

In May 2015, Liwa al-Haqq was part of a joint rebel offensive alongside the al-Nusra Front, Ajnad al-Kavkaz, Jund al-Aqsa, and Faylaq al-Sham against the Syrian government in northwestern Syria, that eventually led to the rebel takeover of much of the Idlib Governorate, including the governorate's capital Idlib.

In September 2015, In response to reports of Russian intervention, Liwa al-Haqq commander Abu Abdullah Taftanaz posted a tweet addressing "infidel Russians", and threatening to "slaughter you like pigs."

In October 2015, a Russian air raid targeted a Liwa al-Haqq base in the Raqqa Governorate using KAB-500KR precision-guided bombs, reportedly killing two senior IS commanders and up to 200 militants.

In November 2015, Liwa al-Haqq and al-Nusra both released photos of an American made Humvee captured from an Iranian-backed Iraqi Shiite militia in southern Aleppo, that was believed to be Kataib Hezbollah.

In early May 2016, Liwa al-Haqq took part in a campaign part of the Army of Conquest coalition in southern Aleppo, during the offensive al-Nusra deployed SVBIEDs targeting Shiite militia fighters in the area, and Jund al-Aqsa carried out separate attacks in coordination with al-Nusra and the Turkistan Islamic Party in Syria during the offensive.

On 28 January 2017, Liwa al-Haqq, alongside the Nour al-Din al-Zenki Movement, Jabhat Ansar al-Din, Jaysh al-Sunna and Jabhat Fateh al-Sham, which was formerly al-Nusra until disengaging from al-Qaeda and rebranding in 2016, together merged to form Hayat Tahrir al-Sham.

In June 2018, Hayat Tahrir al-Sham arrested several members of IS-linked cells in eastern Idlib, including cells affiliated Liwa Dawud which pledged allegiance to IS in 2014 and members of Liwa al-Haqq.

== See also ==
- List of armed groups in the Syrian Civil War
