= Fathi Baja =

Libyan politician

Fathi Mohammed Baaja (Arabic: فتحي محمد البعجة), also called Fatih Baaja, is a Libyan academic and was a member of the National Transitional Council in charge of political affairs and representing Benghazi.

He was Libya's Ambassador to Canada. from 2013 to 2017.

== Biography ==
Baaja attended Cairo University, Northeastern University, then Mohammed V University in Morocco, where he earned a PhD in political science at Mohammed V University. He taught at Garyounis University.

He wrote the manifesto adopted by leaders to outline the basic goals of the 2011 Libyan civil war: democracy and national unity. Baja represents the city of Benghazi on the National Transitional Council of Libya. He is also the member of the council in charge of political affairs, and as such heads the Political Affairs Advisory Committee. In this role, he has had direct contact with leaders and representatives from the Libya Contact Group. He has stated that council members have studied the De-Ba'athification of Iraq and the aftermath of dissolution of the Soviet Eastern Bloc and wish to avoid similar disorder and purging of policemen and officials in Tripoli and other cities. He has also worked to assure foreign leaders that rivalries will not erupt within the council and that the transition will be democratic.

He was accredited as Ambassador to Canada from 2013 to 2017, he then return to Libya and sought to go back to Canada, where his wife and three children were later granted refugee status.

In October 2023, Baja was detained by Libya’s Internal Security Agency in Benghazi. As of early 2025, he remains imprisoned without formal charges. According to his family in Canada, his detention is politically motivated, stemming from his criticism of the authorities and his association with opposition movements.
