= Battle of Tripoli (2011) =

Battle of the First Libyan Civil War

Coordinates: 32°54′8″N 13°11′9″E

- Part of the First Libyan Civil War
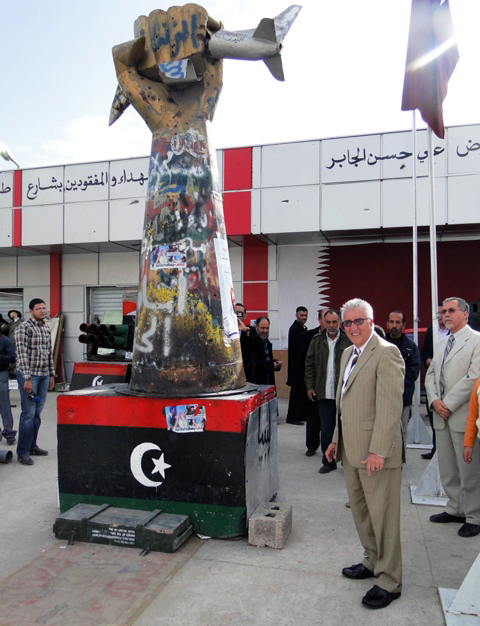
- Ambassador Gene A. Cretz standing next to Fist Crushing a U.S. Fighter Plane Sculpture, which was toppled and captured in Bab al-Azizia in Tripoli.
| Date | 20–28 August 2011 (1 week and 1 day) |
| Location | Tripoli, Libya |
| Result | Decisive Anti-Gaddafi victory: Capture of Tripoli by rebel forces; Fall of the Jamahiriya Regime.; Majority of Government affiliates either killed or fled to exile.; Gaddafi flees to Sirte.; Sirte and Bani Walid remains under Loyalists control. |

Belligerents
| (Libya) National Transitional Council; National Liberation Army; Tripoli Brigade; Support: Qatar; UAE: (United Nations) UN Coalition forces; NATO command | Libyan Arab Jamahiriya; Libyan Armed Forces; Paramilitary forces; Support: Belarus; 334th Special Forces Detachment; Snipers; Military specialists |

Commanders and leaders
| (Libya) Mustafa Abdul Jalil (Libya) Mahmoud Jibril (Libya) Mahdi al-Harati (Libya) Abu Oweis (Libya) Abdelhakim Belhadj (Libya) Khalifa Haftar (NATO) (Canada) Charles Bouchard | (Libya) Muammar Gaddafi (Libya) Saif al-Islam Gaddafi (Libya) Al-Saadi Gaddafi (Libya) Khamis Gaddafi (Libya) Mutassim Gaddafi (Libya) Ayesha Gaddafi (Libya) Abu-Bakr Yunis Jabr (Libya) Abdullah Senussi (Libya) Mohammed Abdullah al-Senussi (Libya) Mansour Dhao (Libya) Moussa Ibrahim (Libya) Abuzed Dorda (Libya) Baghdadi Mahmudi (Libya) Tohami Khaled (Libya) Al-Barani Ashkal (defected) |

Strength
| 8,000 (Tripoli Brigade) | 3,000~ (Khamis Brigade) |

Casualties and losses
| (Libya) 2,400 killed several wounded and killed foreign soldiers | (Libya) 128+ killed 600 captured 1 tank destroyed 4 armoured vehicles destroyed 4 technicals destroyed 2 MRLS destroyed (Belarus) 4 prisoners |
- 108 civilians killed 167 unidentified killed

The Battle of Tripoli (Arabic: ﻣﻌﺮﻛﺔ ﻃﺮﺍﺑﻠﺲ ma'arakat Ṭarābulis), sometimes referred to as the Fall of Tripoli (Arabic: سقوط طرابلس suqūt Ṭarābulis), was a military confrontation in Tripoli, Libya, between loyalists of Muammar Gaddafi, the longtime leader of Libya, and the National Transitional Council, which was attempting to overthrow Gaddafi and take control of the capital. The battle began on 20 August 2011, six months after the First Libyan Civil War started, with an uprising within the city; rebel forces outside the city planned an offensive to link up with elements within Tripoli, and eventually take control of the nation's capital.

Map showing the situation after the battle within western Libya Held by Anti-Gaddafi forces.(Checkered: Maximum Loyalists gains, April–May.) Rebel gains after the western coastal offensive in August. Last loyalist pockets.

The rebels codenamed the assault "Operation Mermaid Dawn"(Arabic: ﻋﻤﻠﻴﺔ ﻓﺠﺮ ﻋﺮﻭﺳﺔ ﺍﻟﺒﺤﺮ ʻamaliyyat fajr ʻarūsat el-baḥr). Tripoli's nickname is "The Mermaid" (Arabic: ﻋﺮﻭﺳﺔ ﺍﻟﺒﺤﺮ ʻarūsat el-baḥr) (literally "bride of the sea").

== Background ==
=== Opposition in Tripoli ===
Tripoli was the scene of major clashes and a failed uprising in February 2011. Protesters filled Green Square (since renamed Martyrs' Square by the former rebels), and set fire to the People's Hall of the General People's Congress. Fighting was especially fierce in the city's eastern Tajura district, but loyalist forces were able to crush the uprising, with many casualties on both sides. Loyalists shut down the internet thus cutting access to social networks structuring the opposition, while the extensive design of Tripoli did not allow protests to reach critical mass. The opposition was largely weakened, with supporters being unable to connect anonymously and fearing repression, so active members set up meetings to restructure the local opposition. Several loyalists organizing the crackdown were actually double agents, informing rebels of governmental moves and future arrest attempts. Further attempts at protests took place over the next few months with little success. Residents stated that a nighttime guerrilla war was taking place in the streets of Tripoli, as armed rebels reportedly started to control many of the smaller streets in rebel-sympathising districts.

== Timeline of the battle ==
=== 19 August ===
The combined assault on Tripoli was reportedly organised by rebels when it became clear that there would be no successful spontaneous uprising in the capital. According to rebel sources, weapons were smuggled by tugboat into Tripoli during the evening.

=== 20 August ===
Rebel forces within Zawiya fought for control of a strategic bridge on the road to Tripoli, 27 kilometres (17 miles) from the capital. They planned for a major offensive on Tripoli that would take place on the following day.

==== Uprising within Tripoli ====
At just after 8 pm, the uprising within Tripoli began when a group of rebels took over the Ben Nabi Mosque, and began calling the signal of Iftar (إفطار) – the moment Muslims observing Ramadan break their evening fast. Prominent opposition members confirmed that the rebels had been shipping weapons into Tripoli for several weeks, in preparation for this uprising. The centre of the uprising was said to be Ben Nabi Mosque in the city centre, when young men gathered there; prayers were cancelled and women sent home, while the men began shouting anti-Gaddafi slogans, using the loudspeakers to broadcast their chants across the city. Loyalist forces arrived and attempted to assault the mosque, but were driven back by armed residents, taking refuge in the state TV centre nearby. Tripoli residents barricaded their streets and districts with burning tires, joining up with other anti-government opponents. The uprisings quickly spread through Tripoli, notably the neighbourhoods of Fashloum, Souq al Jum'aa, Tajura and Ben Ashur, and continued throughout the rest of the city. That night, heavy fighting was reported in the neighbourhoods of Suq al Jum'a, Arrada street and 20th of Ramdan street (formerly known as 11 June Street), while anti-Gaddafi locals closed off the major Alsika street.

During the night, rebels reportedly captured the Tripoli International Airport, as well as a weapons depot inside the capital. Tripoli residents received text messages from the government, asking them to go out onto the street and "eliminate the armed agents". Heavy fighting within the capital was confirmed by reporters within the city, who heard explosions and sustained gunfire.

Initially, a governmental spokesman stated that all was safe and well within the city and that loyalist forces remained in control of Tripoli. Later, he stated that "armed militants" had "escaped into some neighbourhoods", causing "a few scuffles", but the governmental forces "dealt with it within a half-hour, and it is now calm."

A group of students of the Fateh University who were sympathetic to the rebellion rose up against the armed guards that patrolled the perimeter and the snipers in the taller buildings and seized control of the university during the night.

=== 21 August ===
Rebel forces began advancing east from Zawiya towards Tripoli; they took the town of Joudaim, east of Zawiya, meeting only light resistance from loyalist forces. Next, the town of Al Maya just west of Tripoli was taken. Just outside Tripoli, the headquarters of the elite Khamis Brigade was captured by the rebels, who faced only light resistance.

Boats from Misrata and Zliten carrying rebel forces and arms landed in Tripoli in the early morning, joining rebels within the city in the fight. Following the rebel amphibious landing, they advanced towards the Mitiga airbase.

Al Arabiya and Al Jazeera both reported that the uprising continued as of the early morning; many rebels were reported dead in the district of Qadah, while the Mitiga International Airport was reportedly surrounded by rebel forces, who attempted to obtain its surrender. The entire Tajura district was captured by rebel forces, while fighting in Suk al-Juma, Araba district and Mitiga International Airport continued. A rebel representative stated that the operation was "going easily", with the end target being Gaddafi's Bab al-Azizia compound.

A resident speaking to Al Jazeera from Tajura in Tripoli said about 450 prisoners in poor health were freed from a military base after locals took control of the area and pushed out Gaddafi forces, who were shelling the neighbourhood.

By the afternoon, resident rebels had fully taken control of Tajura, Suq al-Jumaa, Arada, and al-Sabaa neighbourhoods in Tripoli. Fighting was still ongoing in the Ben Ashhour, Fashloom, and Zawiyat al-Dahmani neighbourhoods in Tripoli; the rebels also controlled large portions of the Fashloom, Zawiyat al-Dahmani, and Mansura districts. They also took control of a Tripoli mobile-telephone company.

Rebel forces advancing from Zawiya entered the Janzur suburb of Tripoli during the evening, seemingly facing no resistance as they passed through the western suburbs headed for the city centre, greeted by cheering crowds waving the rebels tricolour flag.

Shortly after taking Janzur, rebels from the Tripoli Brigade took control of the Gheryan bridge, considered the western entrance to Tripoli proper, and entered the Syhia district and began clearing it. They took Hay al Andalus area shortly after and immediately advanced into the Gergraish area of Central Tripoli.

In a night-time press conference, governmental spokesman Moussa Ibrahim stated that there were an estimated 1,300 killed and 5,000 wounded in the Battle for Tripoli; he blamed the death toll on NATO.

Civilians were reportedly celebrating in Tripoli's streets as rebel forces entered the city with little resistance. A senior rebel official, Fathi al-Baja, told the Associated Press that one of the reasons for his group's rapid advance was that Mohammed Eshkal, the head of Mohammed Megrayef Brigade which was assigned to defend the city, was sympathetic to the rebels since the regime had killed his cousin years earlier, such that when rebels reached the gates of Tripoli, the battalion promptly surrendered, allowing the rebels to sweep into the capital with relative ease, facing little resistance.

==== Reported capture of two of Gaddafi's sons ====
On 21 August, the NTC chairman claimed that Saif al-Islam Gaddafi had been captured and the UK representative of the NTC repeated the claim to the satisfaction of the International Criminal Court which stated that they would be contacting the NTC to make arrangements for him to be handed over, so that he may face trial for crimes against humanity. However, early on 23 August, Saif al-Islam appeared to be quite obviously not in rebel custody as he appeared at the Rixos Al Nasr hotel where several foreign journalists were located and offered to give reporters a tour of loyalist-controlled areas.

Al Jazeera also reported in its video that Muhammad Gaddafi, Muammar Gaddafi's oldest son, had handed himself over to rebel forces. Later, it was reported that he had not voluntarily surrendered himself, and one rebel was killed while capturing him. Al Jazeera confirmed the capture and interviewed Muhammad; he took an apologetic tone and blamed what caused the revolution as a lack of wisdom. However, it was reported later that Muhammad escaped from house arrest the next day with the aid of loyalist forces.

When the Libyana telephone company building was taken by the Tripoli Brigade, they sent out the following text message to the people of Tripoli :

God is Great, We congratulate the people of Libya on the fall of the Gaddafi regime.

=== 22 August ===
By 1 am Tripoli time, rebels stated that 90% of Tripoli had been captured, including Green Square in central Tripoli. Al Jazeera and the BBC News, among other news stations, all reported and confirmed that opposition fighters had entered Green Square.

In the morning, Agence France-Presse reported that fighting was ongoing near Gaddafi's compound and in the south of the city. A rebel commander said the loyalists still controlled 15 to 20% of the city. Initially one, then multiple tanks left the Gaddafi residence and began shelling areas of Tripoli. Heavy fighting continued around the Rixos Al Nasr hotel, which housed foreign journalists in Tripoli and remained a government stronghold. Journalists were not allowed to leave the hotel by government forces and were described as being used as a "human shield".

A column of hundreds of armed rebels carrying rocket launchers was reported heading towards Green Square.

An independent Libyan news channel reported some looting at the expatriate Palm City village, just outside Tripoli, but this could not be confirmed. Fighting continued around the Gaddafi compound and near the port, with loyalists using tanks to defend the area.

Libyan state television channels went off air by the afternoon, and rebels were in control of the state TV building.

The situation in Tripoli was confused, but loyalist forces were definitively known to remain in control of Bab al-Azizia, the Rixos Al Nasr hotel, a hospital in Tajura, and part of the port. The situation at the Mitiga International Airport was unclear, though many news organizations reported that rebels had taken it.

During the afternoon, rebels pulled back from an area near Green Square, in what they claim was a plan to launch a coordinated offensive elsewhere. Rebel forces in Tajura said they were negotiating with loyalist forces, holed up in the local hospital, to surrender.

In the evening, rebel forces who were fighting in the western part of Tripoli were pushed back. Also, reports surfaced that Muhammad Gaddafi managed to escape house arrest with the help of loyalist fighters.

In the night of 22 August, a rebel said he expected a hard fight for Gaddafi's compound, confirmed Muhammad Gaddafi's escape and said that rebels were establishing checkpoints at the entrances of Tripoli.

Misrata's local military council said they sent several ships "with a large number of fighters and ammunition on board" as reinforcements to Tripoli.

==== Status of Gaddafi family ====
The location of Muammar Gaddafi was unclear on 22 August; it was thought that he could still be staying in Tripoli, surrounded by the remaining forces in his Bab al-Azizia compound, but this was yet to be determined. Another report had him in the Tajura cardiac hospital. Al Jazeera reported that Muammar Gaddafi allegedly had successfully resisted an attempt to arrest him at the hospital.

Mutassim Gaddafi was allegedly remaining in the Bab al-Azizia compound directing the remaining defences, while Khamis Gaddafi (who had earlier been rumored killed in an airstrike at Zliten) was reported to be leading loyalist tank forces in a counterattack against central Tripoli, in an attempt to relieve the siege of Bab al-Azizia.

Al Arabiya reported that a third Gaddafi son, Al-Saadi Gaddafi, had been captured by the rebels, citing the head of the NTC. He had been reported captured as well the previous day, so it was unclear when and where the capture took place.

On 22 August, two charred bodies were found in Tripoli that Al Jazeera suggested could be the bodies of Khamis and Muammar Gaddafi's brother-in-law Abdullah Senussi. However, it was later found that both men had escaped the battle.

=== 23 August ===
Very early in the morning, CNN reporter Matthew Chance reported that he had seen and spoken to Saif al-Islam Gaddafi in a convoy of armoured Land Cruisers near the Rixos Al Nasr hotel. Al Arabiya reported via Le Figaro that a rebel confirmed that Saif had been captured, but then escaped. The rebels later confirmed that Saif had been in their custody, but escaped in the chaos of the situation. Saif claimed the people of Libya were behind him and his father, that NATO had jammed loyalist communications, including state TV and that "gangs of saboteurs" had been smuggled into Tripoli via civilians cars and boats. Saif was seen amongst Gaddafi supporters handing out weapons to them outside the Bab al-Azizia compound and being organised in "street brigades" to fight the rebels.

It was reported that the port area and surroundings were now under rebel control, though the time and circumstances of capture was unclear.

By the afternoon, Al Jazeera correspondent Zeina Khodr confirmed that rebels were in control of Green Square, now renamed Martyrs' Square by the rebels. She said heavy clashes were taking place in Mansura, and that rebels had advanced within 500 metres (1,600 feet) from Bab al-Azizia.

The assault on Bab al-Azizia soon began. The Guardian described the attack as preceded by heavy bombardment of mortars, rockets, and small arms fire. Later in the afternoon, rebels assaulted and took a gate of Bab al-Azizia. Loyalist forces attempted to defend the compound for some time, but their resistance later ended, with rebels pouring into the compound and firing into the air in celebration. Rebels stormed Gaddafi's personal residence and hoisted their flag above it. Al Arabiya confirmed that the rebel flag was above the house. Reporters were shown stacks of official documents including Gaddafi's personal medical files as additional proof. Further reports showed Gaddafi's hat and golf-cart were retrieved from the compound. No information on Gaddafi's or his family's whereabouts were reported from the captured compound. Gaddafi spoke in a radio address afterwards, claiming that the loss of Bab al-Azizia was only a "tactical move". It was also confirmed that Qatari special forces participated in the assault on Gaddafi's compound.

In the evening, a rebel spokesman claimed that rebel fighters were able to secure the Abu Salim district, which was known to have relatively strong loyalist sentiment. However, later, it was found that the rebel claim was untrue and loyalist forces were still in control of the district. Meanwhile, fighting at Bab al-Azizia restarted as loyalist forces bombarded their former stronghold with mortars and gunfire. International journalists pulled back from the base and one Al Jazeera journalist was wounded.

NTC rebels breached the Bab al-Azizia compound and international news stations broadcast pictures of rebels gathered around the fist crushing A U.S. fighter plane statue, with one fighter having climbed onto it. Graffiti had been drawn on its base by rebel forces. At some point in time, the U.S. flag and initials U.S.A. had been removed from the representation of the plane. Rebels also vandalised other statues of Gaddafi. Following the assault on Gaddafi's compound France 24 TV reported that the Tripoli Brigade had sixty men killed in Tripoli during the previous 48 hours.

=== 24 August ===
Around noon, there were reports of fighting within the inner sanctum of the Bab al-Azizia compound, as snipers reportedly hiding in trees in the recreational area of the compound were still present. The rebels, meeting fierce resistance, continued to use heavy weaponry to expose loyalists and destroy fortifications in the centre of the compound. At one point, the rebels were pushed back from the centre of the complex to the outer wall. Fighting was also reported from the Rixos Al Nasr hotel area. Reporters from inside the hotel reported that Gaddafi loyalists prevented them from leaving the compound, effectively taking them hostage amid gunfire from snipers and dwindling food supplies. Fighting was also continuing in the Abu Salim district, which the rebels claimed to have captured the previous day, and later it was reported that loyalists were still in control of the area, as well as the al-Hadhba district.

Around 5 pm, Tripoli time, all foreign reporters and staff that had been restricted to within the Rixos Al Nasr hotel were able to leave the compound in four vans of the Red Cross. Italy also reported that four Italian reporters were kidnapped near Zawiya.

It was confirmed that rebel forces had been in full control of Tripoli International Airport for four days, and that Gaddafi's personal planes were still on the ground. Despite the airport being secure, clashes were still ongoing on the road near the airport.

The NTC announced full amnesty to anyone close to Gaddafi who killed or captured him. A businessman also offered a $1.67 million reward.

Rebel fighters and armed residents continued to create and staff checkpoints. Lawlessness was avoided and celebration continued in Green Square.

Al-Saadi Gaddafi contacted CNN, stating that he had the authority to negotiate on behalf of loyalist forces, and wished to discuss a ceasefire with US and NATO authorities. This appeared to contradict earlier rebel claims of his capture.

=== 25 August ===
Rebels stated that they had nearly captured Gaddafi when they raided a private house and found evidence that he had spent at least a night there previously. They also besieged a compound where they believed him to be hiding, though they did not explain the reasons for the belief. Opposition forces were also still trying to fight their way into the Abu Salim and Al Hadba al Khadra areas, where loyalists were still in control.

It was also reported that Gaddafi loyalists destroyed a Libyan Airlines passenger plane that was parked at Tripoli International Airport. Meanwhile, sporadic-yet-heavy artillery fire occurred at the airport when rebels tried to take control of a highway leading from the airport to Tripoli. CNN reported a "fierce firefight in one corner of Muammar Gaddafi's compound" at about 2:00 local time.

Reuters reported that rebels stormed the Abu Salim district after a NATO airstrike.

=== 26 August ===
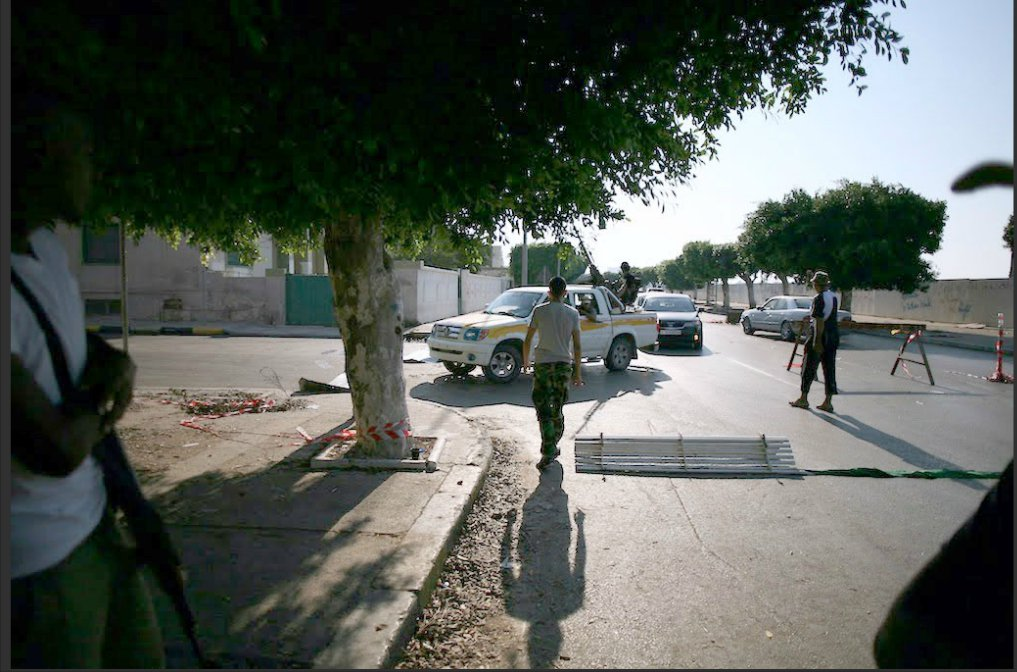
Libyan rebel checkpoint in Tripoli, 26 August 2011.

At Khilit al-Ferjan and Qasr bin Ghashir, two loyalist camps in the Tripoli area, loyalists killed "numerous detainees", according to eyewitnesses. Grenades and gunfire were used on a large group of prisoners after about 160 escaped from a metal hangar.

At this time, Muammar Gaddafi held a meeting with his son Khamis and daughter Ayesha at a military compound in the city, following which they all left Tripoli in two heavily guarded convoys towards Sabha. Ayesha later continued to the Algerian border along with her mother and two brothers. Khamis was reported, by the rebels, to have been killed in a NATO air-strike on 29 August, while traveling to Bani Walid, but there was no independent confirmation of this and NATO stated they had no information on his fate.

=== 27 August ===
During the night, rebel forces were able to secure Qasr bin Ghashir, a village near Tripoli International Airport. They also claimed that the loyalist-held area in greater Tripoli had been reduced to just one compound.

=== 28 August ===
In the final actions of the battle, NLA forces launched an attack on the last remaining loyalist base in Salaheddin, a suburb 5 kilometres (3.1 miles) south of Tripoli and took it after seven hours of fighting.

== Operation Mermaid Dawn plans and aims ==
In the weeks following the battle, the rebels' plans to take Tripoli were revealed. The National Transitional Council had been in contact with rebel cells inside Tripoli, including employees of the Gaddafi government sympathetic to the opposition's cause. Officers within Gaddafi's military and intelligence services gathered data on memory cards and sent them back to the NTC in Benghazi. The data contained invaluable information on the state of the regime, as well as the number of people working in various facilities and the military capabilities of loyalist forces based in Tripoli. The plan was reportedly two months in the making.

When rebel forces advanced into Tripoli on the night of 21 August, General al-Barani Ashkal, commander of loyalist forces at Gaddafi's compound, as well as other senior military officers, at least 72, who were secretly sympathetic to the rebels, but had been asked to remain undercover by the NTC, ordered soldiers under their command to disperse, abandoned their posts and allowed the rebels to enter the city almost entirely unopposed, in line with agreements made secretly between them and the NTC.

The plan was discussed between the NTC and the French government, and rebels drew up a list of over 120 targets for NATO to strike, although the actual number of targets struck was much lower. Memory cards containing information on loyalist command and control centres and other regime military and intelligence facilities were supplied to NATO by rebel cells in Tripoli. The NTC assigned 2,000 armed men to go into Tripoli and 6,000 unarmed to go out onto the streets in the uprising that was to occur the day before the assault on the city from the western outskirts. Communications equipment was supplied to rebel cells within Tripoli by British and Qatari authorities to allow them to communicate with the NTC as well as rebel forces in other areas.

The trigger for the uprising, the so-called "Zero Hour", was the speech by NTC chairman Mustafa Abdul Jalil in which he said the noose was tightening around Gaddafi. Attacks on command and control centres by rebel cells in the city followed, and citizens sympathetic to the rebels barricaded streets and sealed off their neighbourhoods from loyalist forces.

Arms that had been smuggled into the city were distributed by anti-Gaddafi activists in refuse collection trucks the morning before the uprising.

Rebel forces advanced eastwards from Zawiya and entered Tripoli through the Janzur suburb, defeating the Khamis Brigade at its HQ in Al Maya before entering Tripoli proper. Rebels from Misrata landed by sea in the north to support the rebellion already taking place in the city. Rebels hacked into Gaddafi loyalists' communications, hearing them panicking due to the swift rebel advance into the city.

== NATO airstrikes ==
According to NATO's daily "Operational Media Updates", the NATO airstrikes in the Tripoli vicinity during the offensive hit:

20–27 August NATO airstrikes
| Date | Missiles and missile launchers | Tanks | Vehicles | Radars | Buildings | Anti-aircraft guns |
|---|---|---|---|---|---|---|
| 20 August | 9 surface-to-air missile launchers | 1 | 2 technicals | 2 | 3 command and control facilities and 1 military facility | 0 |
| 21 August | 1 surface-to-surface missile and 2 multiple rocket launchers | 0 | 7 surface-to-air missile transloaders, 2 technicals, and 2 armoured fighting vehicles | 1 | 3 military facilities, 1 military storage facility, and 3 command and control facilities | 0 |
| 22 August | 0 Missiles | 0 | 0 Vehicles | 0 | 0 Buildings | 0 |
| 23 August | 3 surface-to-air missile systems | 0 | 2 armoured fighting vehicles and 2 military heavy equipment trucks | 1 | 0 Buildings | 0 |
| 24 August | 1 Surface-to-air missile system and 1 multiple rocket launcher | 0 | 1 Military heavy equipment truck | 1 | 2 Military storage facilities | 2 |
| 25 August | 1 surface-to-air missile transloader and 1 surface-to-air missile launcher | 0 | 0 vehicles | 0 | 1 Command and control node | 0 |
| 26 August | 1 Surface-to-surface missile launcher | 0 | 0 vehicles | 0 | 2 Military facilities and 1 military storage facility | 0 |
| 27 August | 1 Surface-to-surface missile launcher | 0 | 0 vehicles | 0 | 0 buildings | 0 |
| Total | 21 | 1 | 18 | 5 | 17 | 2 |

== See also ==
- Battle of Baghdad (2003)
- Battle of Damascus (2012)
- Battle of Tripoli (2018)
- Fall of Damascus (2024)
