= Isa Tuwaijir =

Libyan politician (born 1957)

Isa Tuwaijir عيسى التويجر

Minister of Planning
- Incumbent
- Assumed office 22 November 2011
- President: Mustafa Abdul Jalil
- Prime Minister: Abdurrahim El-Keib

Personal details
- Born: 1957 (age 68–69) Tripoli, Libya
- Party: Independent
- Education: University of Oregon (B.A.); University of Oregon (M.A.); Hungarian Academy of Sciences (PhD)
- Profession: Mechanical engineering Politician

Isa Tuwaijir (Arabic (عيسى علي التويجر) is a mechanical engineer and a Libyan politician born in the city of Tripoli in 1957. He was named Finance Minister on 22 November 2011 by Abdurrahim El-Keib.
