= Hamza Abu Faris =

Libyan scholar and politician

Hamza Abu Faris حمزة أبوفارس

Awqaf & Islamic Affairs Minister
- Incumbent
- Assumed office 22 November 2011
- President: Mustafa Abdul Jalil
- Prime Minister: Abdurrahim El-Keib

Personal details
- Born: 13 January 1946 (age 80) Msallata, British Military Administration of Tripolitania (now Libya)
- Party: Independent
- Education: University of Libya (B.A.); University of Tripoli (M.A.); Al-Zaytuna University (Ph.D.)
- Profession: Scholar

Hamza Abu Faris (Arabic: حمزة أبوفارس), is a Libyan scholar and politician who was born in Msallata on 13 January 1946. He was named Awqaf & Islamic Affairs Minister on 22 November 2011 by Abdurrahim El-Keib.

== Education ==
Hamza Abu Faris was awarded a teaching certificate in Arabic language and religion teaching from Tripoli in 1967. In 1971 he earned a secondary certificate in the Department of Literature and then advanced to study at the Teachers' College for Higher Education in Tripoli.

Abu Faris obtained his bachelor's degree in French Language and Literature after studying at the Department of Languages.

He earned his master's degree from Al Fateh University in Islamic Studies under the supervision of Dr. Abd' al-Salaam Abu Naji in 1984.

In 2000 Hamza Abu Faris received his Ph.D. in Islamic Sciences, with an emphasis in comparative Fiqh (Islamic jurisprudence) from the University of Zaytuna in Tunisia; his doctoral thesis was entitled "Judge Abdul Wahab al-Baghdadi and his approach to Exegesis of the Prophetic Message."

== Religious training ==
Hamza Abu Faris' relationship with Shariaa sciences (knowledge and training in Islamic legal traditions) begins, at the hands of a local village Shaikh; he completed memorizing the Qur'an in 1982.

Specialties:

- Maliki jurisprudence from (al Malik's) famous works
- Tawhid (principle of God's oneness)
- The science of Hadith (traditions concerning the life of the Prophet Mohamed)
- Quranic exegesis
- Muwatta (a foundational text in the Maliki school of Islamic jurisprudence)
- al-Zurqani's exegesis thereof
- Sahih al Bukhari (canonical Hadith compilation)
- Sahih Muslim (canonical Hadith compilation)

Special expertise in the fields of inheritance and jurisprudential knowledge.

== Teaching career ==
Hamza Abu Faris taught at high school level for several years before teaching at the Faculty of Law at the University of Benghazi and later at the Faculty of Law of Nasser University of Tarhuna. Abu Faris was later appointed to the Faculty of Law at Al Fateh University in Tripoli.

== Other activities ==
Served as co-researcher for the Fiqh Council of the Muslim World League in Mecca, and the European Council for Fatwa and Research.

Participated in a TV program called Islam and Lifestyles on local Libyan TV Channel, which was broadcast live on Fridays and Saturdays.
