= National Transitional Council =

2011–2012 de facto government of Libya

National Transitional Council المجلس الوطني الانتقالي al-majlis al-waṭanī al-intiqālī
- Seal
- Abbreviation: NTC
- Predecessor: General People's Congress of the Libyan Arab Jamahiriya
- Successor: General National Congress of Libya
- Formation: 27 February 2011
- Dissolved: 8 August 2012
- Type: Provisional authority
- Purpose: Deliberative assembly/ deliberative democracy
- Headquarters: Tripoli
- Location: Libya
- Official language: Arabic
- Chairman: Mustafa Abdul Jalil
- Vice Chairman: Mustafa Honi
- Prime Minister: Abdurrahim El-Keib; Mahmoud Jibril

The National Transitional Council (NTC) was a transitional government established in the 2011 Libyan civil war. After rebel forces overthrew the Libyan Arab Jamahiriya of Muammar Gaddafi in August 2011, the NTC governed Libya for a further ten months after the end of the war, holding elections to a General National Congress on 7 July 2012, and handing power to the newly elected assembly on 8 August.

The formation of the NTC was announced in the city of Benghazi on 27 February 2011 with the purpose to act as the "political face of the revolution". On 5 March 2011, the council issued a statement in which it declared itself to be the "only legitimate body representing the people of Libya and the Libyan state". An executive board, chaired by Mahmoud Jibril, was formed by the council on 23 March 2011 after being de facto assembled as an "executive team" since 5 March 2011. The NTC issued a Constitutional Declaration in August 2011 in which it set up a road-map for the transition of the country to a constitutional democracy with an elected government.

The council gained international recognition as the legitimate governing authority in Libya and occupied the country's seat at the United Nations. In referring to the Libyan state, the council used simply "Libya". The UN formally recognized the country as "Libya" in September 2011, based on a request from the Permanent Mission of Libya citing the Libyan interim Constitutional Declaration of 3 August 2011. In November 2011, the ISO 3166-1 was altered to reflect the new country name "Libya" in English, "Libye (la)" in French.

== Background ==
=== Uprising and civil war ===
After popular movements overturned the rulers of Tunisia and Egypt, Libya's immediate neighbours to the west and east, Libya experienced a full-scale uprising beginning in February 2011. By 20 February, the unrest had spread to Tripoli. Much of Libya had slipped out of Gaddafi's control, falling to anti-Gaddafi forces. Eastern Libya, centered around the second largest city and vital port of Benghazi, was firmly under the control of the opposition. The opposition began to organise themselves into a functioning government. Anti-Gaddafi forces marched on Sirte (Gaddafi's hometown) on 28 September 2011. Gaddafi loyalists delayed the attack with the use of their snipers. The fight for Sirte ended on 20 October with the capture of the town and the death of Colonel Gaddafi.

=== Early efforts to form a government ===
Opposition meeting in Bayda, 24 February 2011

On 24 February 2011, politicians, former military officers, tribal leaders, academics and businessmen held a meeting in the eastern city of Bayda. The meeting was chaired by former justice minister Mustafa Abdul Jalil, who quit the Jamahiriya government a few days before. The delegates discussed proposals for interim administration with many delegates asking for UN intervention in Libya. The podium at the meeting displayed the pre-Jamahiriya flag.

On 25 February, Al Jazeera TV reported that talks were taking place between "personalities from eastern and western Libya" to form an interim government for the post-Gaddafi era. The following day, former justice minister Mustafa Abdul Jalil was announced to be leading the process of forming an interim body, to be based in Benghazi. Jalil stated that "Gaddafi alone bore responsibility for the crimes that have occurred" in Libya; he also insisted on the unity of Libya and that Tripoli was the national capital. The efforts to form an alternative government have been supported by the Libyan ambassador in the United States, Ali Suleiman Aujali. The Libyan deputy ambassador to the United Nations, Ibrahim Omar Al Dabashi, stated that he supported a new alternative government "in principle".

=== Establishment of a national council ===
A National Transitional Council was formed on 27 February to act as "the political face of the revolution". Its spokesman, Abdul Hafiz Ghoga, made clear at the launch press conference that the national council was not a provisional government and added that the newly formed council was not in contact with foreign governments and did not want them to intervene. He later clarified that an airstrike mandated by the United Nations would not be considered a foreign intervention.

An Al Jazeera journalist in Benghazi reported that a fully fledged interim government would not be formed until Tripoli was under opposition control. This contradicted Jalil's statement of the previous day about the formation of a provisional government. These comments were later clarified by the council as Jalil's "personal views".

On 5 March, the council issued a statement in which it declared itself to be the "sole representative of all Libya". Mustafa Abdul Jalil was named as chairman of the council.

On 10 March, France became the first country to recognise the council as Libya's only legitimate government.

=== Formation of an executive board ===
On 23 March, the council established an executive board to act as a transitional government for Libya. Jibril, who had served as chairman of the informal "executive team" since 5 March, was appointed as chairman of that board, stating that council would serve as the "legislative body", and the new Executive Board would serve as the "executive body". Jibril led the meeting and negotiations with French President Nicolas Sarkozy, a meeting that resulted in France officially recognizing the council as the sole representative of the Libyan people.

=== Instability in 2012 ===
In mid-January 2012, protesters against the NTC stormed its Benghazi headquarters, demanding greater transparency on expenditures, that Gaddafi-era officials be sacked, and that Islamic sharia law be the source of the country's future constitution. Jalil was in the building, but slipped out the back before protesters broke in and stole computers and furniture. A few days earlier, Abdul Hafiz Ghoga, vice president of the NTC, was surrounded and jostled by a group of university students in Benghazi, before being pulled to safety by supporters.

=== Dissolution ===
In a ceremony on 8 August 2012—held in the evening due to the daytime fast of Ramadan—the NTC formally transferred power to the General National Congress. Jalil stepped down as chairman, passing the position to the GNC's oldest member, Mohammed Ali Salim. The NTC was then dissolved, while the GNC members took their oath of office, led by Salim.

Hundreds of people gathered in Tripoli's Martyrs' Square with candles symbolizing reconciliation. The date of the transfer—20 Ramadan on the Islamic calendar—had also been selected for symbolic reasons, as 20 Ramadan the previous year had fallen on 20 August, the date that the rebels attacked Tripoli, leading to Gaddafi's flight. As Jalil addressed the crowd, attendees chanted "Allahu Akbar!" or another phrase meaning "The blood of martyrs will not go wasted!"

According to BBC News, the transfer was "the first peaceful transition of power in Libya's modern history", meaning the history since the end of the monarchy in 1969, when Gaddafi rose to power.

== Aims and objectives ==
The "Declaration of the founding of the National Transitional Council" stated that the main aims of the council were as follows:

- Ensure the safety of the national territory and citizens
- Coordination of national efforts to liberate the rest of Libya
- Support the efforts of local councils to work for the restoration of normal civilian life
- Supervision of the Military Council to ensure the achievement of the new doctrine of the Libyan People's Army in the defense of the people and to protect the borders of Libya.
- Facilitate the election of a constituent assembly to draft a new constitution for the country; be put to a popular referendum
- Form a transitional government to pave the holding of free elections
- Guide the conduct of foreign policy, and the regulation of relations with other countries and international and regional organizations, and the representation of the Libyan people

In another statement clarifying the goals for a post-Gaddafi Libya, the council committed itself an eight-point plan to hold free and fair elections, draft a national constitution, form political and civil institutions, uphold intellectual and political pluralism, and guarantee citizens' inalienable human rights and the ability of free expression of their aspirations. The council also emphasized its rejection of racism, intolerance, discrimination, and terrorism. Article 1 further declares Tripoli the state capital and Arabic the official language while reserving the linguistic and cultural rights of ethnic minorities as well as the freedom of religion for religious minorities.

The stated aim of the NTC was to form a de jure interim government based in Tripoli and hold elections for a General National Congress to replace it. The GNC would then elect a prime minister, appoint a Constituent Assembly to draft a constitution subject to its approval by the Public National Conference (PNC) and by referendum, and then oversee free elections for a representative government.

== Structure and membership ==
=== Legislative body ===
National Transitional Council المجلس الوطني الانتقالي al-majlis al-waṭanī al-intiqālī

Type
- Type: Unicameral

Leadership
- Chairman: Mustafa Abdul Jalil
- Vice Chairman: Mustafa Honi
- Seats: 51 members

Meeting place
- Tripoli, Libya

Website
- ntclibya.com

The National Transitional Council claimed to be, and was widely recognized as, the "only legitimate body representing the people of Libya and the Libyan state". Starting off at 33 members, it rose to 51, with proposals to increase its size further to 75 or even 125.

Al Jazeera English reported that each city or town under opposition control will be given five seats on the new council and that contact will be established with new cities that come under opposition control to allow them to join the council. The identities of members of the council were not disclosed at the launch conference. Human Rights lawyer Hafiz Ghoga was the spokesperson for the new council. An Al Jazeera English journalist in Benghazi stated that Mustafa Abdul Jalil still had a leadership role within the new council. The council declared that Jalil was the head of the council. The council met formally for the first time on 5 March 2011 when it was announced that the council had 33 members. The names of some of the members were kept secret to prevent threats to their families that were still in Gaddafi-held areas of Libya.

In September 2011, some of the NTC's members were in Benghazi, while some had moved to the de jure capital Tripoli. On 8 September, the head of government Mahmoud Jibril became the highest-ranking NTC official yet to move to Tripoli. Prior to Jibril's relocation, Deputy Chairman Ali Tarhouni was the de facto leader of the NTC in Tripoli.

==== Members ====
The members of the council included:

Council members:

- Mustafa Abdul Jalil – chairman of the council
- Mustafa Honi – vice chairman of the council
- Zubeir Ahmed El-Sharif – Political Prisoners representative
- Omar El-Hariri – Military Council representative

City Representatives:

- Hassan Fadeel – City of Ajdabiya
- Salih Dirssi – City of Bayda
- Ahmed Dayikh – City of Bayda
- Mustafa Houni – City of Jufra
- Abd al-Qadr Minsar – City of Khoms
- Emadaldeen Nussayr – City of Zawiya
- Khaled Nassrat – City of Zawiya
- AbdAllah Turki – City of Zintan
- Mukhtar Jadal – City of Ajaylat
- Ahmed Zway – City of Kufra
- Mustafa Lindi – City of Kufra
- Abdullah Moussa Al-Mayhoub – City of Quba
- Taher Dyab – City of Marj
- Mussa Balkami – City of Ubari
- Mohamed ZaynAbideen – Lower Nafusa
- Fathi Mohammed Baja – City of Benghazi
- Ahmed Al-Abbar – City of Benghazi
- Salwa Fawzi El-Deghali – City of Benghazi
- Khaled Sayih – City of Benghazi
- Mansour Kikhia – City of Benghazi
- Intisar Ageeli – City of Benghazi
- Abd al-Basset Naama – City of Tarhuna
- Ihbaybil Doii – City of Jadu
- Ashour Bourashed – City of Derna
- Khaled Ahmed ShikShik – City of Zliten
- Othman BenSassi – City of Zuwara
- Abd al-Majeed Sayf-alNasser – City of Sabha
- Mohamed Rimash – City of Sirte
- Fraj Shoeib – City of Shahhat
- Ali al-Juwani – City of Sabratha
- Farhat Shirshari – City of Sorman
- Othman Mgayrhi – City of Tobruk
- Alameen Bilhaj – City of Tripoli
- Abd al-Razzag Aradi – City of Tripoli
- Mohamed Hrayzi – City of Tripoli
- Abd al-Razzag Abuhajar – City of Tripoli
- Ali Shitwi – City of Tripoli
- AbdAllah Banoon – City of Tripoli
- Abd al-Nasser Salem – City of Tripoli
- Abd al-Basset Abadi – City of Tripoli
- Abd al-Nasser Nafaa – City of Tripoli
- Salih Darhub – City of Tripoli
- Osama AbuKraza – City of Tripoli
- Milad Oud – City of Tripoli
- Ali Manaa – City of Ghadames
- Idris AbuFayid – City of – Gharyan
- Jamal Issa – City of Kabaw
- Ali Gamma – City of Murzuk
- Abd al-Hadi Shaweesh – City of Murzuk
- Ramadan Khaled – City of Msallata
- Ibrahim BenGhasheer – City of Misrata
- Suleiman Al-Fortia – City of Misrata
- Mohamed Elmuntasser – City of Misrata
- Salem Gnan – City of Nalut
- Hassan Sghayir – City of al Shatii
- Saad Nasr – City of al Shatii
- Abd al-Razzaq Madi – City of Yafran
- Mubarak al-Futmani – City of Bani Walid
  - AbdAllah Banoon of Tripoli resigned to form a political party.

=== Executive Board ===
On 5 March 2011, a crisis committee was set up to act as the executive arm of the council. An Executive Board was announced on 23 March 2011. It originally had 15 members, but a minor reorganisation apparently removed the post of Military Affairs from the council proper and created a successor position for Defence on the board, expanding the bureau to 16 members.

The executive board was dismissed on 8 August 2011 due to administrative mistakes in investigating the assassination in July of Free Libyan Army commander General Abdel-Fatah Younes. Chairman Mahmoud Jibril, the only designated member of the executive board who was not fired, was tasked with forming a new Board.

==== Members (March–August 2011) ====
Prior to the re-shuffle in August 2011, the board members were:

- Mahmoud Jibril – Chairman and head of international affairs
- Ali Al-Issawi – vice-chairman
- Ahmed Hussein Al-Darrat – Internal Affairs and Local Government
- Jalal al-Digheily – Defence (formerly Military Affairs)
- Mahmoud Shammam – Media
- Naji Barakat – Health
- Mohammed Al-Allagi – Justice and Human Rights
- Hania Al-Gumati – Social Welfare
- Abdullah Shamia – Economic
- Ali Tarhouni – Finance and Oil
- Anwar Fituri – Transportation and Communications
- Abulgassim Nimr – Environment
- Atia Lawgali – Culture and Community
- Abdulsalam Al-Shikhy – Religious Affairs and Endowments
- Ahmed Al-Jehani – Reconstruction and Infrastructure
- Suliman El-Sahli – Education

==== Members (October 2011) ====
A new cabinet was unveiled in early October 2011, though not all of its members were announced at once. Individuals confirmed to be part of the new board included Mahmoud Jibril as prime minister, Ali Tarhouni as deputy prime minister, and Jalal al-Digheily as defence minister. On 23 October, Jibril resigned as Mustafa Abdul Jalil declared an end to the Libyan civil war, and Abdurrahim El-Keib succeeded him as prime minister on 31 October.

The executive board was dissolved on 22 November 2011 as per the Interim constitution which stated that the executive board must be dissolved upon the formation of the Interim Government.

=== Interim government ===
El-Keib unveiled the interim government on 22 November 2011:

- Abdurrahim El-Keib – Prime Minister
- Mustafa A.G. Abushagur- Deputy Prime Minister
- Hamza Abu Faris – Minister of Awqaf & Islamic Affairs
- Ali Ashour – Minister of Justice
- Anwar Fituri – Minister of Communications and Information Technology
- Mustafa Rugibani – Minister of Labor
- Fatima Hamroush – Minister of Health
- Fawzi Abdel A'al – Minister of Interior
- Awad Beroin – Minister of Energy
- Taher Sharkas – Minister of Trade and Commerce
- Sulaiman al-Sahli – Minister of Education
- Ashour Bin Khayal – Minister of Foreign Affairs
- Osama al-Juwali – Minister of Defense
- Isa Tuwaijir – Minister of Planning
- Mabrouka Jibril – Minister of Social Affairs
- Abdulrahman Ben Yezza – Minister of Oil
- Hasan Zaglam – Minister of Finance
- AbdulHamid BuFruja – Minister of Agriculture
- Mahmoud Fetais – Minister of Industry
- Naeem Gheriany – Minister of Scientific Research and Higher Education
- Ahmed Attiga – Investment Authority
- Abdul Rahman Habil – Minister of Culture and Civil Society
- Awad al-Baraasi – Minister of Electricity
- Ashraf bin Ismail – Martyrs Authority
- Mohammad Harari – Minister of Local Government
- Ibrahim Alsagoatri – Minister of Housing
- Yousef Wahashi – Minister of Transportation
- Fathi Terbil – Minister of Youth
- Ibrahim Eskutri – Minister of Construction

=== Local government ===
During the war, in opposition-held Benghazi, a 15-member "local committee" made up of lawyers, judges and respected local people was formed in order to provide civic administration and public services within the city. Residents have organised to direct traffic and collect refuse. Many shops and businesses have opened again. A newspaper and two local radio stations were also established.

Similar "local committees" were formed in other cities controlled by opposition groups.

=== Commercial bodies ===
The council established the following commercial bodies to manage its financial affairs:

- The Central Bank of Benghazi – to act as the "monetary authority competent in monetary policies in Libya"
- Libyan Oil Company – to act as the "supervisory authority on oil production and policies in the country"

== Armed forces ==
The anti-Gaddafi forces were Libyan armed forces which were constituted during the 2011 war by defected military members and armed citizens in order to engage in battle against remaining members of the Jamahiriya's armed forces, hired mercenaries and paramilitary loyal to the rule of Muammar Gaddafi. The National Liberation Army, formerly known as the Free Libyan Army, was the NTC's military arm, with the small Free Libyan Air Force operating assets including captured and defected fighter jets and helicopters.

Omar El-Hariri was the first military affairs minister the NTC named, holding that position from 23 March 2011 forward. By 19 May 2011, however, Jalal al-Digheily had replaced El-Hariri. Then on 8 August 2011, Digheily along with 14 other members of the executive board were fired and the position left vacant, but was reappointed in early October 2011 after continuing in the role of interim defense minister for almost two months. Then on 22 November 2011, the executive board was dissolved for the formation of the Interim Government and Osama al-Juwali became the new Defense Minister.

On 1 April 2011, Abdul Fatah Younis was announced as commander of the NTC's forces, in an attempt to form an organized fighting structure due to a string of failures. Younis was killed in an attack on 29 July 2011 which was variously blamed on pro-Gaddafi agents, rogue rebel militiamen, and the NTC itself. Suleiman Mahmoud, Younis's top lieutenant, replaced him as army commander.

== Foreign relations ==
Libya Countries that recognised the NTC as the sole legitimate representative of Libya during the civil war Countries that have yet to formally recognise the NTC, but voted in favor of it to take Libya's UN seat Countries that formally opposed recognition of the NTC at the UN Countries that voted against the transfer of Libya's UN seat to the NTC

In July 2011, the Libya Contact Group of representatives of many nations announced its participants' agreement to deal with the National Transitional Council as the "legitimate governing authority in Libya". The council also received the backing of the Arab League and the European Union. On 16 September 2011, the United Nations General Assembly voted to award Libya's UN seat to the NTC. On 20 September 2011, the African Union officially recognised the NTC as the legitimate representative of Libya.

Mohammed El Senussi, the pretender to the throne of Libya, also voiced his support for the NTC.

While NTC forces were working to secure military victory on the ground, the NTC's chairman, Mustafa Abdul Jalil, was working to foster good diplomatic relations overseas. Before Gaddafi was killed Abdul Jalil negotiated a deal with the British government to pay millions in compensation to victims of IRA attacks that used Jamahiriya-supplied arms.

=== Military intervention ===
United Nations Security Council Resolution 1973 authorised a multi-national effort to establish a no-fly zone. On 19 March, British, French and US air forces began attacking targets in Gaddafi-controlled Libya, thereby initiating the UN military intervention. Operations were led by NATO under Operation Unified Protector, after initially being led by a joint UK, US and French command. Non-NATO states such as Jordan, Qatar, Sweden, and the United Arab Emirates also contributed to the military mission.

== See also ==
- General National Congress
