= Benghazi District =

Second largest district of Libya, largest district in Cyrenaica.

Benghazi بنغازي
- District

- Benghazi District in Libya
- Country: Libya
- Capital: Benghazi

Area
  - Total: 11,372 km^{2} (4,391 sq mi)

Population (2006)
  - Total: 670,797
- License Plate Code: 8

Benghazi District (lit. 'Son of Ghazi') is one of the 22 districts of Libya. Formerly coextensive with the undermentioned and eponymous city up until 2007, the city of Benghazi also serves as the capital of this district. It is not only the second most populous district in Libya after Tripoli, but it is also the largest district of the region of Cyrenaica.

== Administrative divisions ==
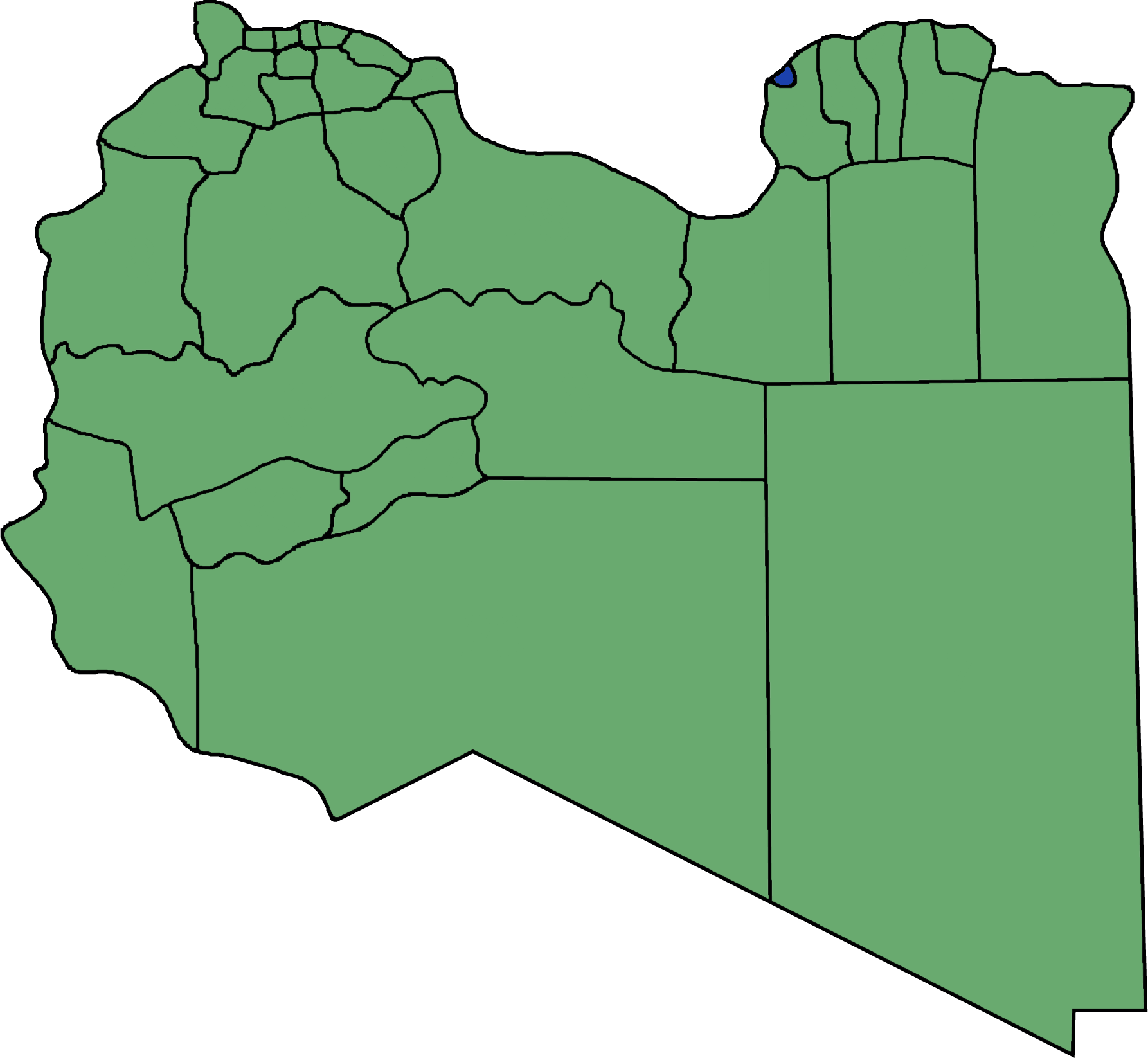
Benghazi district between 2001 and 2007

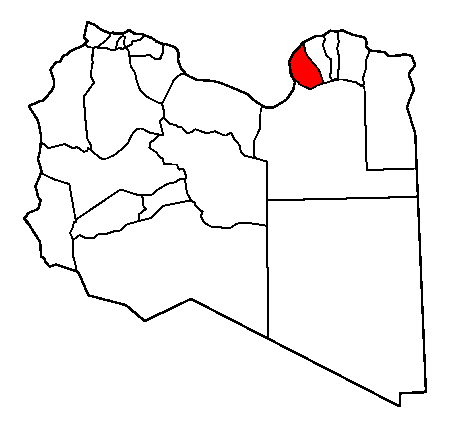
Benghazi district since 2007

Benghazi District is one of Libya's 22 shabiyahs (people's districts).

In 2022, 18 provinces were declared by the Libyan Government of National Unity: the eastern coast, Jabal Al-Akhdar, Al-Hizam, Benghazi, Al-Wahat, Al-Kufra, Al-Khaleej, Al-Margab, Tripoli, Al-Jafara, Al-Zawiya, West Coast, Gheryan, Zintan, Nalut, Sabha, Al-Wadi, and Murzuq Basin.

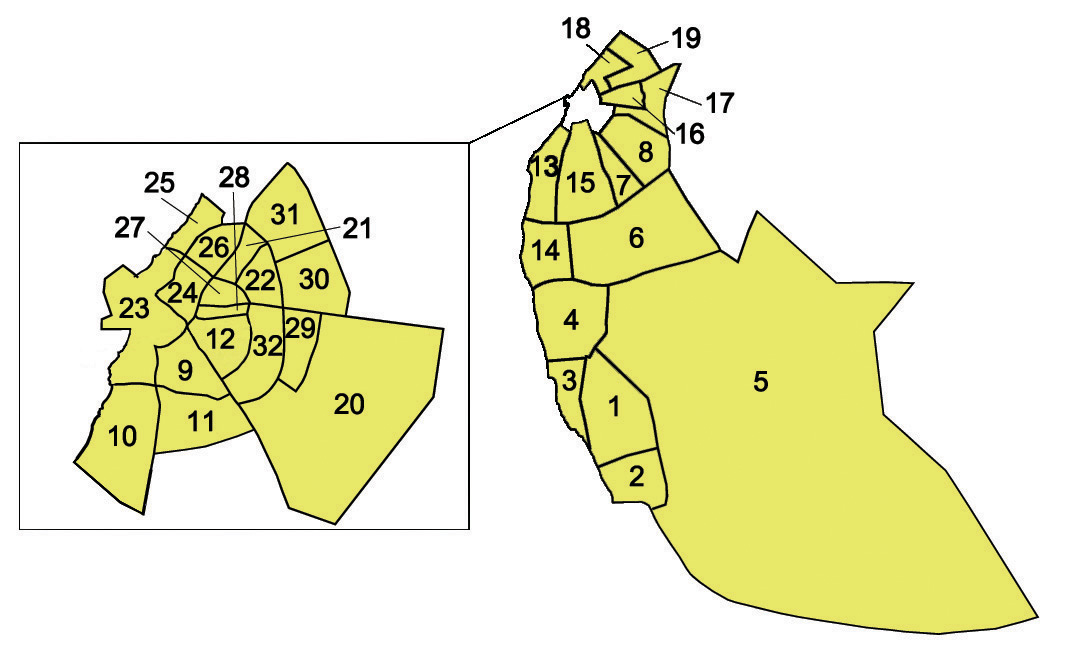
There are 32 Mu'tamarat Sha'bia in the District of Benghazi.

Benghazi Baladiyah is divided into 32 Basic People's Congress administrative divisions, in which the responsibilities of the corresponding political units of the same name fall. The official 32 Basic People's Congresses of Benghazi are:

1 Al-Magroon
2 Al-Saahil al-Gharbi
3 Karkoora
4 Gimeenis
5 Suluq
6 Al-Khadhraa
7 Al-Nawagiya
8 Al-Magziha
9 Al-Keesh
10 Garyounis
11 Al-Fuwayhat

12 Al-Berka
13 Bu-Fakhra
14 Jarrutha
15 Al-Quwarsha
16 Bu Atni
17 Benina
18 Al-Kwayfiya
19 Sidi Khalifa
20 Al-Hawari
21 Al-Thawra al-Shabiyah
22 Shuhadaa al-Salawi

23 Madinat Benghazi
24 Sidi Hsayn
25 Al-Sabri
26 Sidi Abayd
27 Al-Salmani
28 Raas Abayda
29 Benghazi al-Jadida
30 Al-Uruba
31 Hay al-Mukhtar
32 Al-Hadaa'iq
