= Timeline of the Libyan civil war (2014–2020) =

Libyan civil war timeline

This is a detailed timeline of the Libyan civil war (2014–2020) which lasted from 2014 to 2020.

== 2014 ==
On 12 January, the Libyan Deputy Minister of Industry, Hassan al-Droui, was shot dead in Sirte.

=== 16–17 May 2014: Operation Dignity offensive in Benghazi ===
==== Fighting ====
Hostilities first broke out early in the morning of Friday 16 May 2014 when General Khalifa Haftar's forces assaulted the bases of certain Benghazi Islamist militia groups, including the one blamed for the 2012 assassination of US ambassador Christopher Stevens. Helicopters, jets and ground forces took part in the assault, killing at least 70, and injuring at least 250. Haftar also vowed not to stop until the extremist groups are purged. Shortly before the assault, Haftar reportedly asked a close friend, "Am I committing suicide?"

The operation, codenamed "Operation Dignity" by Haftar, began when Libyan National Army forces attacked units of the February 17th Martyrs Brigade, the Libya Shield No. 1 Brigade, and Ansar al-Sharia. Fighting was largely confined to the south western Benghazi districts of Hawari and Sidi Ferej. In particular the fighting focused on the area between the southwestern gate checkpoint and the cement factory; an area controlled by Ansar al-Sharia. As part of the fighting helicopters were seen over Hawari. Fighting was also reported in the port area between marines and the Libya Shield No. 1 Brigade.

Haftar's forces seemingly moved on Benghazi from the east, with some units originating from Marj. Included within these forces were various tribal units. Elements of the Libyan military in Benghazi then seemingly joined them. There were also unconfirmed reports of forces loyal to Ibrahim Jadhran's Cyrenaica federalist forces fighting alongside units loyal to Haftar.

Although the Libyan Air Force and marines have close links with the Saiqa Special Forces Brigade, neither the Brigade, nor the Benghazi Joint Security Room (BJSR), were seemingly involved. The BJSR former spokesperson, Colonel Mohammad Hejazi, spoke of Libyan military forces fighting "terrorist formations" in the Benghazi districts of Sidi Ferej and Hawari. Hejazi also claimed that Libyan "army forces" were now in control of a camp at Rafallah Al-Sahati. The Libya Herald also claimed that an eyewitness had claimed to have seen tanks belonging to the Saiqa Brigade stationed on the road in front of its camp at Buatni. The Brigade called for Benghazi residents to avoid districts witnessing the clashes.

As a result of the fighting the streets of Benghazi were largely empty and roads into Benghazi were effectively closed. The fighting also resulted in the closure of Benina International Airport, near Benghazi.

The following day, fighters from Rafallah al-Sahati and the 17 February Brigade also returned to their bases, from which they had been driven off the previous day.

==== Haftar's subsequent press release ====
On 17 May, Haftar held a press conference in which he proclaimed that the current General National Congress was no longer representing the Libyan people and was illegitimate. He claimed to have uncovered evidence that the GNC had opened Libya's borders to avowed terrorists and had invited numerous international Islamist fighters to come to Libya, offering them Libyan passports. He explained that his primary aim was to "purge" Islamist militants from Libya, specifically the "terrorist" Muslim Brotherhood.

==== Government reaction ====
At a government press conference held as a response to the Benghazi assault, acting Prime Minister Abdullah Al-Thinni condemned the move by Haftar as illegal and claimed that the move undermined attempts to confront terrorism. Thinni had called Ansar al-Sharia a terrorist organisation earlier in May 2014.

Thinni claimed that only 1 Libyan Air Force plane had taken part in the clashes, alongside 120 army vehicles, although eyewitnesses reported to CNN as having seen multiple aircraft involved in the assault.

Major General Abdulsalam Jad Allah Al-Salheen Al-Obaidi, the Chief of Staff of the Libyan National Army, also condemned the attack by Haftar, and called forces loyal to him "intruders into Benghazi". Instead Obaidi urged "revolutionaries" in Benghazi to resist them.

The next day, Libya's army responded to Haftar's airstrikes by proclaiming a no-fly zone over Benghazi banning all flights over the city in a direct challenge to Haftar in order to prevent the paramilitary force from using air power against Islamist militias in the region.

==== Casualties ====
By the end of the first day, the LNA had seemingly suffered 4 dead and 24 wounded. LNA dead and wounded were taken to a hospital in Marj. The number of dead and wounded from the Islamist groups was made difficult due to Ansar al-Sharia's policy of not releasing casualty reports. The 17th February Brigade similarly released no figures. Overall, the resulting battle claimed between 70 and 75 lives.

=== 18 May: Operation Dignity offensive in Tripoli ===
General Haftar's militia allies backed by truck-mounted anti-aircraft guns, mortars and rocket fire attacked parliament, sending lawmakers fleeing for their lives as gunmen ransacked the legislature, declaring the body suspended. A commander in the military police in Libya read a statement announcing the body's suspension on behalf of a group led by Haftar.

The clashes began on the evening of Sunday 18 May, beginning first at the GNC building, before then spreading to Hay Al-Akwakh, particularly in the area of the steel bridge on the Airport road. Missiles were also reported to have fallen close to the TV station on Ennasr Street. Heavy firing was also heard in the Corniche area on the way to Mitiga airbase. The clashes however died down by the late evening.

Later on Sunday evening a group of 5 officers, who identified themselves as the Leaders of the Libyan Army, announced the suspension of the General National Congress. The officers, under the lead of the Zintani former head of Military Intelligence, Colonel Muktar Fernana, instead announced that the Constitutional Committee would carry out the work of the GNC. Under the plan al-Thinni's government was to remain in office, and would oversee the formation of military and security forces. The statement, therefore, blocked Ahmed Maiteeq from assuming the position of Prime Minister. Colonel Fernana also proclaimed that the Libyan people "would never accept to be controlled by a group or organization which initiates terror and chaos". Colonel Fernana claimed that General Haftar had assigned a 60-member assembly to take over from the GNC, with the current government acting only on an emergency basis.

=== 19–20 May 2014: Military commanders endorse Operation Dignity movement ===
On 19 May, Colonel Wanis Abu Khamada, the commander of Libya's Special Forces, announced that his forces would be joining Haftar's operation against Islamist militant groups in Benghazi. Khamadas Special Forces had previously come under attack from Islamist militants in Benghazi, with dozens of members of the unit being killed. In his declaration Khamada announced that his unit would join Haftar's Libyan National Army "with all our men and weapons". Khamada argued that the operation was "the work of the people". By Monday the death toll for Friday's clashes had reached 79. However, the Tripoli-based Al-Qaeda-inspired Lions of Monotheism group announced that it would fight forces loyal to General Haftar.

Forty members of parliament, and the heads of the navy, the air-force, and much of the army have endorsed Haftar. On the evening of 21 May the National Forces Alliance issued a statement of support of Haftar, proclaiming that Libyans have found themselves "drowning in swamp of terrorism, darkness, killing and destruction". The following day the official Libyan news agency claimed that the Interior Ministry had announced its support for Haftar's operation, in direct contrast to the governments denunciation of the operation as a coup.

The Libyan Revolutionaries Operations Room issued a call for serving military personnel to desert, claiming that they did not need the support of Haftar. The group called on its forces to temporarily withdraw from the Army, and to disclose to their commanders the names of anyone involved in attempting to kill either officials or members of the security forces. It would seek the prosecution of named individuals through the Attorney General's office. In their announcement LROR claimed that they would lead the fight against criminals in Libya, and would carry on without Haftar or his operation.

In a televised statement late Wednesday Haftar appeared in a military uniform surrounded by military officers and accused the current Islamist-led parliament of turning Libya to a state "sponsoring terrorism" and a "hideout to terrorists" who infiltrated the joints of the state, wasted its resources and controlled its decision making. He asserted that the military wants the continuation of political life and stressed that the new council is a civilian one in an apparent attempt to defuse fears of militarizing the state.

Tripoli residents reported several loud explosions earlier that day near the al-Yarmouk air defense barracks. This came after the air defense top commander Juma al-Abani released a video message saying he was joining Haftar's campaign against Islamists. Heavy fighting involving anti-aircraft machine guns mounted on trucks also broke out overnight near an army camp in Tajoura, an eastern suburb. The city was quiet by dawn. The health ministry reported that at least two people from Mali died in the fighting.

Ansar al-Sharia issued a statement denouncing Haftar's operation as a "war against the religious Muslim youth". The group instead claimed that they had been the subject of a hate campaign by those against Islam and Sharia, and that their opponents were the real terrorists. The group instead claimed that they wished to safeguard Muslim blood and had not hindered the building of Libya's security organisations. The group claimed that the campaign against them was being conducted by "evil television channels" and were led by "ex-regime sympathisers and secularists supported by their masters in the west". The group also asked tribes to prevent their sons from joining Haftars forces.

=== 22–31 May 2014: Weekly pro-Haftar demonstrations, political and military developments ===
On both 23 May and 30 May after Friday prayers, tens of thousands of demonstrators rallied in various cities including Tripoli and Benghazi in support of General Haftar and his campaign against Islamist militias and also in support of Haftar's calls to suspend parliament. In Benghazi, thousands of pro-Haftar demonstrators gathered outside Tibesti Hotel and in the city's Tahreer Square, as well as others in the city of Bayda further east. "No to militias, Libya will not become another Afghanistan" and "Yes to the army, yes to the police", their banners read. Meanwhile, crowds in Tripoli's Martyr's Square chanted against the parliament and in support of a national army and police force to replace the militias that run rampant in the country. They sang the national anthem as they waved the flag and carried banners that read "Yes to Dignity". They called for an official response to the militias. "Libya is in trouble, we want police, we want army", they chanted. While some Libyans don't back Haftar and don't want military rule, they support what he is doing. The protest, dubbed the "Friday of Dignity", took its name from the offensive launched by Haftar, one week ago in the eastern city of Benghazi. The demonstrations were some of the largest the country had seen since the uprising three years ago, and were the first since then to be held simultaneously in cities across Libya, which put more pressure on the embattled Islamist-led parliament to offer concessions. The interim government issued a statement in support of Friday's protests and reasserted its proposal this week to suspend parliament. "The participation of tens of thousands [in the protests] requires all to answer to the demands of the people who represent legitimacy that can't be ignored", the statement said.

In opposition to Haftar, Islamist militias from Misrata, known collectively as the Libyan Central Shield, have deployed in the capital amid a standoff with forces loyal to Haftar. They are under the command of the country's chief of staff who answers to the GNC. This followed calls by the head of the (now boycotted) GNC and the army chief on the Islamist militias to defend the interests of the GNC.

Meanwhile, within the Libyan government itself, an intense power struggle had emerged between Maiteeq and Thinni for leadership of the Libyan government, including conflicting orders and statements. On 28 May, Operation Dignity forces carried out airstrikes on the February 17th Martyrs Brigade, one of the biggest and best-trained Islamist militias in eastern Libya. The Islamists allegedly responded with anti-aircraft fire.

=== June 2014 ===
On 2 June, fighting re-erupted in Benghazi when Ansar al-Sharia militants attacked Haftar's forces, the latter responding with combat helicopter strikes in the west of the city. At least 22 people were killed and 70 wounded, with both sides accusing one another of indiscriminate firing on residential areas. It started the previous day, when aircraft pounded one of the militants' compounds in region. The education ministry closed schools and postponed exams until the violence is quelled and hospitals called for blood donations. Residents in south Benghazi set up checkpoints to avoid being taken by cross-fire in case rival fighters decided to take shelter in their homes. There was also fighting in the eastern town of Al-Marj where dozens were wounded.

The next day, Libya's new prime minister Ahmed Maiteeq took office following his previous election by Libya's Islamist-dominated parliament in a contested vote. This was during a power struggle between him and outgoing PM Abdullah al-Thani. Maiteeq was surrounded by an Islamist militia, the Libyan Central Shield, who escorted him to the cabinet building to assume his new post and hold his first cabinet meeting after Al-Thani ordered his forces guarding the building to stand down in order to avoid bloodshed. Al-Thani called on the General National Congress to wait until the country's Supreme Constitutional Court decides whether the Maiteeq's election is legal or not, while Islamist lawmakers who back the new prime minister blamed Al-Thani for Benghazi's violence and accused him of failing to restore security and of preventing the transition of power in favor of Maiteeq.

On 4 June, four people were killed and several others were wounded, among them was air division chief General Saghr al-Jerushi, in an assassination attempt on General Haftar in his home in the town of Abyar east of Benghazi. Haftar himself survived the attack which took place when a vehicle exploded in a farmhouse where the general held his meetings. His spokesman accused Islamist militias of being behind the attempt. The same day, Michael Greub, a 42-year-old Swiss national who was head of the International Committee of the Red Cross sub-delegation in Misrata, was killed in the city of Sirte when his vehicle was ambushed by masked gunmen right after he left a meeting with two other colleagues. The attackers opened fire on the car, killing him, while his driver and escort managed to escape unharmed. Yves Daccord, the ICRC's director-general condemned the attack and said that the organization was "devastated and outraged".

The Supreme Constitutional Court of Libya said on 5 June that Ahmed Maiteeq's election was illegal. "The election of Ahmed Maitiq took place without a majority of votes and his appointment was unconstitutional," the court stated. Al Arabiya reported that Abdullah al-Thani and his interim government left the capital for Bayda after being threatened by militia groups that support Maiteeq. The following day, Libya's intelligence chief Salem al-Hassi submitted his resignation, expressing disapproval over the parliament's insistence on appointing Maiteeq in contested circumstances. Tarek Mitri, head of the United Nations Support Mission in Libya, announced an initiative for dialogue bringing together the country's political forces, expressing concern over the violence in Benghazi. On the same day, Haftar's forces launched air raids on Islamist bases in Benghazi's Sidi Faraj and al-Qawarsheh and destroyed an ammunition warehouse in Derna.

On 9 June, the Supreme Constitutional Court gave its final ruling on Maiteeq's contested vote, declaring that it was unconstitutional and invalid without citing a legal basis for the decision. The GNC accepted the ruling via a statement by the parliament's second deputy speaker. Maiteeq stepped down shortly after, saying that he would be "the first" to comply with the judiciary's ruling. "Abdullah al-Thani is the caretaker prime minister until congress learns the court's reasons for deciding Maiteeq's election was unconstitutional," he said. The next day, Haftar announced that he had agreed to a ceasefire deal brokered by the Crisis Committee appointed by the government which also includes dialogue with other warring parties. The deal was attempted to allow Libyans to vote during GNC elections that were to be held on 25 June after parliament agreed to dissolve itself following a ruling by the country's elections commission. Meanwhile, Ansar al-Sharia denied reports that it would hold talks with Haftar. "We have not reached agreement with the Crisis Committee, and we did not even agree to negotiate with this dictator [Haftar]," the group said in a statement. This came after the body of one of Ansar al-Sharia's leaders, Al-Mahdi Saad Abu al-Abyad, was found south of Derna. However, the militia group added that it would welcome any talks with tribal leaders instead. On 11 June, a suicide car bomber targeted a checkpoint manned by fighters loyal to General Haftar in Benghazi. The lorry exploded upon arriving at the post, killing the perpetrator and injuring five soldiers, one losing his leg.

On 15 June, Haftar's forces launched a new assault on a number of jihadist camps in western Benghazi. The offensive consisted of tanks and rocket launchers and explosions were heard throughout the city. The general's spokesman said that the forces managed to capture several senior Islamists, among them were five militant leaders. An electricity plant near the city's airport was hit by rockets, causing power outages. The number of casualties was unclear but hospital sources indicated that 12 people were killed during the clashes, among them five soldiers and three civilians.

On 17 June, American special forces and FBI personnel captured Ahmed Abu Khattala, whom they suspect to have a connection with the 2012 attack in Benghazi that killed US ambassador Christopher Stevens and three other American nationals. President Barack Obama said that Abu Khattalah will face "the full weight of the American justice system".

On 22 June, General Haftar gave a 48-hour ultimatum for Turkish and Qatari nationals to leave eastern Libya, accusing both countries of supporting terrorism in the country.

On 26 June, shortly after the elections, Salwa Bughaighis, a human rights lawyer in Benghazi, who was a critic of both Muammar Gaddafi and several of the Islamist militias which overthrew him, was assassinated in her home.

Libya Body Count claimed June saw 43 people killed in fighting.

=== July 2014: Operation Dawn and fall of Benghazi to Anti-Haftar forces ===
See: Battle of Tripoli Airport

Islamist extremists are reported to have killed some 270 lawyers, judges, activists, military officers, and policemen—activists in civil society—in the course of taking over Benghazi in the summer of 2014.

On 13 July, a coalition of military entities and militias, including the Libya Revolutionaries Operations Room (LROR) and some brigades from the Misrata Union of Revolutionaries, such as Hatten, Mercer, and Haraka, launched an offensive codenamed "Operation Dawn" on Tripoli International Airport, thus beginning the Battle of Tripoli Airport. They were later joined by other militias from Misrata, Tripoli, and Zawiya, as well as by Islamist militias, the Knights of Janzour, Amazigh units, and some militias associated with cities of the Jebel Nafusa. The following day, the United Nations Support Mission in Libya evacuated its staff after 13 people were killed in clashes in Tripoli and Benghazi. The fighting, between government forces and rival militia groups, also forced Tripoli's airport to close. A militia, including members of the LROR, tried to seize control of the airport from the Qaaqaa and Sawaiq Brigades of the Zintani militia, which had controlled it since Gaddafi was toppled. Both the attacking and defending militias are believed to be on the official payroll. In addition Misrata Airport was closed, due to its dependence on Tripoli International Airport for its operations. Government spokesman, Ahmed Lamine, stated that approximately 90% of the planes stationed at Tripoli International Airport were destroyed or made inoperable in the attack, and that the government may make an appeal for international forces to assist in reestablishing security. A week of prolonged fighting between rival militias in Tripoli airport resulted in at least 47 deaths: the battle involved use of artillery and Grad rockets.

On 26 July, the United States evacuated its embassy in Tripoli, moving all State Department employees to Tunisia.

On 27 July, (the last day of the fasting month of Ramadan in Libya) an oil depot near Tripoli International Airport was hit by rocket fire, igniting a large blaze. The oil depot had a capacity of 6 million liters, and nearby liquid gas storage facilities were at risk of being ignited by the blaze. Libyan TV stations urged residents to evacuate the area. By 28 July (Eid al-Fitr day in Libya), firefighters had withdrawn from the site due to fighting in the area, though the fire was not yet under control.

On 29 July, Islamist groups including Ansar al-Sharia seized a military base in Benghazi that served as the headquarters of the Saiqa Special Forces Brigade; a unit that supports General Khalifa Haftar. Saiqa Special Forces officer Fadel Al-Hassi claimed that Saiqa abandoned the base, which included both Camp 36 in the Bu Attni district as well as the special forces school, after coming under heavy shelling. The battle for the base involved the use of rockets and warplanes, and resulted in the deaths of at least 30 people. During the fighting a pro-Haftar MiG crashed into waste ground in Kuwaifiya, although the pilot, however, managed to eject. Operation Dignity Spokesperson Mohamed Hejazi claimed that the aircraft had suffered a technical malfunction, and insisted it had not been shot down. Following the fall of the base, video footage emerged of Mohamed al-Zahawi, the head of Ansar al-Sharia, as well as Wissam Ben Hamid, the leader of Libya Shield 1, standing outside the base. Saiqa initially denied the loss of the base, although Saiqa Commander Wani Bukhamada acknowledged the loss by the afternoon of the 29th. A senior Saiqa official later claimed to the Libya Herald that Saiqa losses in Benghazi between 21 and 30 July totaled some 63 dead and 200 wounded. Whilst the official was unsure of the number of Islamist dead, he claimed that it was in the dozens. The fighting, having involved indiscriminate shelling and bombing in and around the predominantly residential area of Buatni, also resulted in dozens of civilians being killed in crossfire.

Mustafa A.G. Abushagur, a politician elected in the July elections, and who was widely tipped to become the next President of the House of Representatives, was kidnapped from his Tripoli home in the late afternoon of 29 July by an armed group in an ambulance. He was released several hours later, at 3:00 am on 30 July, without any ransom having been paid. Abushagur later held a conference on 1 August in Tripoli, where he claimed to have been kidnapped by The Zintani Barq Al-Nasr militia, although he stressed he did not believe the group to have been acting on behalf of their city.

On 30 July Mohamed Sowan, the leader of the Justice and Construction Party; the Libyan wing of the Muslim Brotherhood, voiced support for the ongoing offensive in Tripoli by Islamist militias against Zintani Militias at Tripoli International Airport. Sawan claimed the offensive was a legitimate response to the anti-Islamist Operation Dignity being led by General Haftar.

The same day the leader of Ansar al-Sharia declared that Benghazi is an "Islamic Emirate". Protesters opposed to the militia group marched to the al-Jalaa hospital that the militants were guarding and temporarily seized it. The protesters also rallied to the special forces base that Ansar al-Sharia captured, but were dispersed when militants fired upon them. By 31 July, Islamist forces affiliated with the newly formed Shura Council of Benghazi Revolutionaries, which includes Ansar al-Sharia, was reported to have captured most of Benghazi. Forces loyal to General Haftar appeared to have had the territory under its control in the region reduced to Benina International Airport. Speaking to al-Arabiya News, Haftar denied that Benghazi was under the control of militias, and instead claimed that his National Libyan Army was in control of the city, claiming instead that his LNA forces had only withdrawn from certain positions, and had done so for tactical reasons.

Aircraft under the command of Brigadier-General Saqr Geroushi, the commander of Operation Dignity Air Force units, later launched nighttime air strikes on what they claimed to be an Ansar al-Sharia base in Ajdabiya, which had recently been taken by Ansar al-Sharia. Geroushi claimed the target; the compound of a Chinese construction company, had been being used by Ansar al-Sharia as an arms depot and a support base for its operations in Benghazi. In response to questions over reported deaths resulting from exploding arms in the depot, Geroushi claimed he did not know if anyone had been killed or injured in the raid. Geroushi claimed however that the assault would continue until Ansar al-Sharia was forced out of the town. Geroushi also claimed that Ansar al-Sharia had been taking their wounded from the fighting in Benghazi to the hospital in Ajdabiya, which he claimed had been taken over by Islamists. He also claimed the more severely wounded were being transported to Misrata, and then on to Turkey for treatment.

=== August 2014 ===
On 1 August, the Libyan Health Ministry announced that the recent fighting in the greater Tripoli and Benghazi areas had, up to Wednesday 30 July, resulted in a total of 214 deaths and 981 injuries recorded at hospitals. Libya Body Count, an independent NGO, claimed that July alone had seen over 400 deaths, with 253 recorded in Benghazi, and 130 in Tripoli.

On 2 August, twenty-two people were killed and more than 70 wounded when a battle broke out in Tripoli International Airport, during which the government claimed that heavily armed groups attacked civilians, displacing hundreds of families. Over the next couple of days, several missiles landed randomly on the city's airport road and in nearby districts such as Abu Sleem, Seraj and Krimea among others. Rocket attacks in Hadba killed several people, including a 59-year-old Indian worker. In Tripoli's western suburb of Janzour, the local Fursan Janzour militia as well as the National Mobile Forces camp, which is part of the Misrata-led Operation Dawn and allied to the militia, came under attack and were overrun by Zintan's Barq al-Nasr Brigade, backed by Warshefana forces. The number of fatalities during the fighting is unknown. Libya's Red Crescent estimated that 2,500 families were forced to flee during the violence.

On 5 August, Warshefana forces captured Camp 27, an important military barracks, in an overnight joint operation with the Zintanis from Libya Shield 1, an Islamist militia. On 6 August 2014, the Benghazi Revolutionary Shura Council announced that they had seized three additional army bases in Benghazi, seizing a large number of heavy weapons and armored vehicles in the process. On 7 August 2014, Camp 27 was reported to have been retaken by forces affiliated with the Operation Libya Dawn coalition.

On 10 August, Major General Abdulsalam Al-Obaidi, the Chief of Staff of the Libyan National Army, gave evidence in a three-hour session before the newly elected House of Representatives in Tobruk. During the session Obaidi claimed he had "no control" over the various government funded rebel groups. Speaking about the Libya Shield Force, Obaidi claimed he had no way to find out how many soldiers were fighting under the Force, and also claimed to have no way to either reform the group or change its leadership. Mohammed el-Jarh, a Libyan analyst based in Tripoli, claimed that members of the House of Representatives were determined to hold Obaidi accountable after his comments. Benghazi representative Salih al-Shawihidi denied that there were plans to replace Obaidi with Saad al-Qatrani. The following day a letter that had been sent by Obaidi to numerous militias on 6 August was leaked on the internet. In the letter Obaidi instructed all groups, including the Libya Shield Forces which are officially under his command, and which he had assigned to Tripoli, to stop fighting. The letter reflected the House of Representatives decision No. 3, which had been issued on the same day, and which ordered all sides to commit to an immediate cease fire.

==== Operation Dignity tries to close Benghazi Port ====
On 11 August Brigadier General Saqr Adam Geroushi, Command of Operation Dignity's Air Force Units, stated that Operation Dignity units would attack any ships attempting to enter Benghazi port, despite any orders from Benghazi Municipal Council or the Libyan government. Geroushi claimed that the port was being used by Islamist fighters to reinforce and resupply their positions in Benghazi, and that reinforcements were being shipped to Benghazi form the ports of Mirsata, Ras Lanuf and Derna. Operation Dignity Air Units reportedly proceeded to bomb the port of Derna on 11 August.

Operation Dignity forces had previously ordered the port to close, although the Benghazi council had announced on 9 August that the port would remain open. The same day Operation Dignity spokesperson Mohamed Hejazi claimed all shipping to or from the ports of Misrata or Derna would also be fired upon. Instead all shipping was ordered to redirect to the Operation Dignity stronghold of Tobruk.

==== Assassination in Tripoli ====
On 12 August, masked gunmen shot dead Colonel Muhammad Swaysi, head of Tripoli's police department, when his car was ambushed by two other vehicles after he left a meeting with local authorities in the Tajoura suburb. Two of his colleagues were kidnapped when they attempted to leave the car. Suways was a supporter of Haftar's Operation Dignity, and had come out against the Misrata-led Operation Libya Dawn. Earlier in the week Suways, who was in charge of security in Tripoli, had ordered Tripoli's police officers to return to work, as Tripoli's police officers had not been in active service since the Civil War. A group calling itself the Official Operations Room, said to be linked with the LROR, claimed on its Facebook page that Misratan militias, with the help of others from Suq al-Huma, had arrested four individuals who it accused of planning to take over a camp in Tajoura. The group described the four as Gaddafi supporters, and claimed two, including Suways, had been killed.

==== House votes to disband militias and calls for UN support ====
On 13 August the House of Representatives passed a law disbanding all officially recognized and funded militias formed after the 2011 February revolution, including Joint Operations Rooms in an effort to strip the various groups of the legitimacy they claim to have been bestowed on them by the GNC and various government ministries.

Out of the 104 Representatives present 102 voted in favour of the motion. A deadline of 31 December 2014 was given for implementing the law. The House had tried to pass the law the previous day although had failed to agree on the laws wording. In spite of the law it was unclear how it would be enforced.

A Libyan lawmaker speaking to Reuters claimed the law to cover "all armed brigades, including all the Shields and Qaqaa and Sawaiq." Ali Saedy, Representative for Wadi Shatti, in live comments on Libyan TV, claimed that the law had been passed by a large majority of the House. He claimed that some of those opposed to the law felt that the time was not right to dissolve all Libyan militias, whilst others were opposed due to having different opinions or ideologies. Ali Tekbali, a Representative for Tripoli, claimed that the reason only 104 of the House's 200 members took part was because many Representatives were unable to attend the vote in Tobruk due to being busy with various business.

The same day the House also called for the United Nations and the Security Council to intervene in Libya in order to protect civilians and government institutions. Representative Saedy claimed that the House had been forced into calling for international support after the House' calls for a ceasefire were ignored.

==== Clashes in Benghazi and airstrikes in Tripoli ====
On 17 August, the Al-Saiqa special forces abandoned their last stronghold in the city, Benina Airport. They were pushed out through Gwarsha into Benghazi's Buatni district where Operation Dignity forces had asked the residents to leave the area for their safety. The head of Al-Saiqa said that the unit took over the airport road which was held by Ansar al-Sharia, adding that the Islamist group had been firing shells into Buatni's surroundings and that heavy clashes took place in Ard Bayera.

Later that day, unidentified warplanes bombarded a number of positions in Tripoli, including the Islamist-held Wadi Rabie camp and an ammunition store owned by Misrata's Hattin Brigate in the town of Qasr bin Ghashir near the city's international airport. Five people were killed and more than 30 were wounded during the overnight operation. The government confirmed the incident and the Libyan armed forces' chief of staff, General Abdulsalam Al-Obaidi, said that the attack involved two unidentified aircraft powered by laser-guided smart bombs and missiles fired from a 7 to 8 kilometers altitude. He also said that the government's air force was not equipped with such weaponry and did not have the required technology nor the capacity to carry out the raids. Furthermore, none of the country's militias are known to have warplanes. The Libya Revolutionaries Operations Room (LROR) allied to the Misratan brigades blamed General Khalifa Haftar's forces. Operation Dignity forces initially denied any involvement, adding that they only provided the coordinates. However, Haftar's air chief, General Saqr Geroushi, later confirmed his forces' involvement in a statement to Reuters. "We, the Operation Dignity, officially confirm to have conducted air strikes on some militias' locations belonging to Misrata militias," he said. Geroushi also added that a munitions base at Sdada, south of Misrata, had also been bombed.

==== Towns reject House of Representatives ====
The same weekend delegations from the cities of Misrata, Khoms, Zliten and Emsalata travelled to Sebha to in an attempt to try and persuade the local council and civil society organisations to order the area's nine representatives in the new House of Representatives to withdraw. Several days later the Sebha Municipal Council building was stormed by armed men who prevented council officials from reading a joint statement on Operation Dawn. One official claimed those responsible were members of the Awlad Sulaiman tribe, which is opposed to Operation Dawn.

On 19 August, the Amazigh towns of Nalut and Kabaw in the Nafusa Mountains announced a boycott of the House of Representatives, which they claimed was unconstitutional. The Nalut Municipal Council, along with Nalut's revolutionary brigades and civil society organisations called on Salem Ignan, the towns representative, to withdraw from the parliament, which they claimed had an obvious bias towards Haftar's Operation Dignity, as seen in the fact that it was based in Tobruk. The Kabaw town leadership claimed that they would not recognise any decisions made by the new parliament, and also that the town's representative, Ali Al-Asawi, did not, and had never, represented the town. Both towns, in particular, rejected the House's call for foreign intervention in Libya in response to the upsurge in violence. Despite the timing of the announcements, the boycotts were seen as having more to do with the long-standing Amazigh boycott of the parliament over the issue of Amazigh representation, and less to do with the opposition to the parliament from Misrata and Islamist groups. It was immediately unclear whether the representatives from the towns would boycott the parliament.

The following day leaders in Tarhuna released a statement announcing their opposition to the House of Representatives and their support for Operation Dawn. The town released a joint statement from the towns revolutionaries, Local Council, Military Council, Elders, Shura Council and a number of civil society organisations, in which they announced that the towns four representatives in the parliament did not represent the town, and represented only themselves. The town leaders also rejected all decisions made by the parliament, especially its recent call for foreign intervention in Libya. The statement denounced the call as a "flagrant violation of the sovereignty of Libya and a betrayal of the will of the Libyan people," and claimed that the airstrikes conducted several days prior against Operation Dawn were the result of the decision. The groups also declared that they had set up a Revolutionary Shura Council of Tarhuna, which they claimed would assume full responsibility for correcting the path of the nation and implementing the principles of and goals of the Libyan Revolution.

==== Splits emerge in Benghazi ====
Splits between Islamist groups in Benghazi also began to emerge in mid-August. On 16 August, a Muslim Brotherhood group made up of more moderate Islamists announced a new group to deal with problems in the city, called the Shura Council of Benghazi. In response, the Shura Council of Benghazi Revolutionaries, a jihadist group, denounced the new group and claimed that they would not recognize it. The Shura Council of Benghazi Revolutionaries also claimed that the new rival group was attempting to grab power and capitalize on the gains made by the jihadists.

==== Fall of Tripoli Airport ====
On 23 August, after more than a month of fighting, Tripoli International Airport finally fell to fighters from Libyan Central Shield, a coalition of Islamist and Misrata forces. The following day, Operation Dawn forces announced that they have consolidated the whole city and adjacent towns after driving out rival Zintan militias 90 kilometers south of the capital. Libya's newly elected parliament condemned the offensive and called the militants now in control of Tripoli "terrorist organizations". Operation Dawn spokesman later called for the re-assembly of the previous Islamist-dominated GNC and said that the taking over of the airport was necessary to "save the country's sovereignty". The Los Angeles Times reported that at least 90% of the airport's facilities, and 20 airplanes, were destroyed in the fighting.

=== September 2014 ===
Islamist armed groups extended their control over central Tripoli. The House of Representatives parliament set up operations on a Greek car ferry in Tobruk. A rival General National Congress parliament continued to operate in Tripoli.

On 15 September, targets in the predominantly Amazigh city of Gharyian were subjected to airstrikes. Khalifa Haftar claimed to have ordered these attacks.

On 21 September 2014, a rival oil minister, Mashallah al-Zawie, gave a speech at the oil ministry in Tripoli, suggesting that the central government of Libya had lost control of oil production.

=== October 2014, start of Derna campaign (2014–16) ===
Military confrontation between factions in western Libya, particularly since the beginning of October, had increasingly been waged between groups supportive of the Zintani brigades and opponents of those forces. The spread of combat zones beyond Tripoli as well as the intensification of fighting in the Nafusa Mountains had accelerated this trend.

A Libya Dawn source reported that clashes had erupted along the al-Kassarat road and in the Wadi al-Hai region. The fighting was primarily between a coalition of Misratan and Gharyianian militiamen and other Libyan Dawn forces on one side and an alliance of the Zintani-oriented Qa'qa' militia and forces aligned with Warshafana and the Noble Tribes on the other. Libyan Dawn forces claim to have captured the Wadi al-Hai region as a result of these battles.

Heavy fighting commenced in the city of Kikla and the surrounding vicinity on 11 October when Zintani brigades initiated an offensive to gain control over various towns and routes in the Nafusa Mountains. Many residents wounded in the fighting are being treated at medical facilities in Gharyan. The escalating strife in the Nafusa Mountains had raised fears of the prospect for broader tribal and ethnic warfare.

On 15 October, units associated with Khalifa Haftar and Operation Dignity staged ground and air attacks against the Ansar al-Sharia and the 17 February Martyrs Brigade organizations in Benghazi. Haftar claimed that this was the concluding stage of Operation Dignity and that he would retire from his position upon the termination of the operation. There were conflicting reports about possible Egyptian involvement or assistance in the offensive.

Also, on 15 October, the Libya Herald quoted a Zintani commander as stating the clashes were ongoing between Zintani militias and the Saraya Gharian force in the vicinity of Gwalish. The Libya Herald also reported that officials in Gharyan have requested military assistance from the cities of Jadu and Nalut in fighting the Zintani brigades.

The GNA had announced its own set of oil policies, drawing criticism and denunciation from Prime Minister Thinni of the Tobruk-based government. The rival oil minister, Mashallah al-Zawie, had urged the resumption of stalled investments.

Clashes between Tuareg and Tebu tribal militias have repeatedly flared in Ubari at various times during October.

On 5 October 2014, radical militants in control of the Libyan city of Derna joined ISIL, thus making Derna the first city outside Syrian and Iraq to be occupied by ISIL. This marked the start of Derna campaign.

=== November 2014 ===
On 1 November, Zintan militia captured the town of Kikla, killing 18 and wounding 84 Islamist fighters.

On 5 November, a Tuareg militia reportedly seized control of the El Sharara oil field in Fezzan.

On 11 November, Sudanese foreign minister Ali Karti claimed that the rival Libyan governments had both accepted a peace initiative proposed by Sudan as a framework for resolving the division and conflict permeating the country.

On 12 November, car bombs were detonated in Tobruk and al-Bayda. The Tobruk attack reportedly wounded at least 21 people. On 13 November, bombs targeted the embassies of Egypt and the UAE in Tripoli.

On 24 November, warplanes affiliated with Operation Dignity forces attacked the Mitiga airport in Tripoli. The attack led to a temporary shut down of the airport, though it reportedly failed to damage the airport facilities, as munitions instead struck and damaged nearby houses. On 25 November, a second air raid against Mitiga was conducted, although this attack also failed to incapacitate the facility's infrastructure. In response to the attack on Mitiga, a court in Tripoli issued an arrest warrant for Khalifa Haftar.

=== December 2014 ===
On 2 December, local sources in the city of Zuwara reported that aircraft associated with Operation Dignity struck a food supply storage area, a fishing port, and a chemical factory, damaging these facilities, as well as killing eight and wounding twenty-four.

A demonstration was held in Tripoli's Algeria Square calling for the implementation of a constitutional monarchy as a means of resolving some of the country's difficulties.

After amassing strength in Sirte, Misratan forces launched on 13 December an offensive called "Operation Sunrise" against the Petroleum Facilities Guard, led by Ibrahim Jathran, and other pro-Tobruk forces for control of Ras Lanuf and the Sidra oil terminal. Several days of clashes over the oil facilities have ensued, including the deployment of airstrikes in the struggle. Most of the air assaults have been conducted by forces allied with the Tobruk-based government, however, Libya Dawn forces allegedly carried out an airstrike on 16 December in the al-Hilal region. This attack reportedly caused no casualties or infrastructure damage.

On 16 December, a car bomb detonated in Tripoli near the city's security headquarters, reportedly causing no casualties but inflicting damage on nearby buildings and cars.

On 18 December, the National Oil Corporation reiterated its commitment to political neutrality and independence from partisan affiliation with either of the two rival governments.

On 25 December, Libya Dawn militia launched an assault on a power plant inside Sirte killing at least 19 soldiers. On the same day a rocket struck an oil export terminal in the city of Sidra engulfing it in flames.

On 27 December, a car bomb was detonated in Tripoli near the General Directorate for the Protection of Diplomatic Missions, though no casualties were reported. ISIL claimed responsibility for the attack.

On 28 December, the Libyan air force struck Misrata Airport as a reprisal for attacks by Libya Dawn on oil terminals. A port facility, an air force academy, and a steel plant were also targeted. Local security officials claimed that the airport sustained no damage and remained operational.

On 30 December, the Libyan air force shot down a Libya Dawn helicopter around Al-Sidra oil terminal. Aircraft and at least one helicopter from the militia had attacked government forces deployed in the area.

== 2015 ==
=== January 2015 ===
On 5 January, the Libyan air force bombed a Greek-owned tanker, chartered by Libya's National Oil Corporation, off the coast of Darna that was believed to be acting 'suspiciously', killing two crew members and wounding two. The bombing caused Turkish Airlines, the last foreign airline still flying to Libya, to suspend flights.

On 9 January, assailants attacked the al-Nabaa News TV Channel's headquarters in Tripoli with rocket-propelled grenades, inflicting damage on the facility. No casualties were reported.

On 16 January, the Operation Dignity and Libya Dawn factions declared a ceasefire and agreed to form a unity government and further political talks.

On 27 January, gunmen attacked the Corinthia Hotel, a location frequently used by Libyan officials and foreign diplomats, in Tripoli. After detonating a car bomb in the parking lot, the assailants stormed the building and opened fire, killing at least ten individuals besides the attackers. Libyan security forces have since reclaimed control over the hotel building. ISIL claimed responsibility for the attack.

=== February 2015, Fall of Nofaliya ===
On 4 February, gunmen believed to be linked to the Islamic State of Iraq and the Levant stormed and seized control of the Al-Mabrook oilfield south of the city of Sirte. A French diplomatic source in Paris said four local employees were believed to have been killed in the raid.

On 9 February, the Islamic State of Iraq and the Levant took over the town of Nofaliya in Sirte District, after a convoy of 40 heavily armed vehicles arrived from Sirte and ordered Nofaliya's residents to "repent" and pledge allegiance to Abu Bakr al-Baghdadi. The fighters appointed Ali Al-Qarqaa as emir of the town.

On 13 February, gunmen affiliated with the ISIL seized government buildings and radio and television stations in Sirte. These forces reportedly issued an ultimatum demanding other military entities evacuate the city by the dawn of Sunday (15 February). In response, the unrecognized rump GNC of the Tripoli-based government announced a decision to form a joint force to reclaim facilities in Sirte from ISIL militants. However this joint force never did attempt to recapture the city from ISIL, this comes as a result of Misrata militias withdrawing from Sirte when ISIL attacked their posts.

On 15 February, ISIL in Libya released a video depicting the beheading of 21 Coptic Christians from Egypt. Within hours, the Egyptian Air Force responded with airstrikes against ISIL training locations and weapons stockpiles in Derna in retaliation for the killings, killing around 50 militants and 7 civilians. Warplanes acting under orders from the Tobruk-based government also struck targets in Derna, reportedly in coordination with Egypt, whereas the Tripoli-based government condemned the airstrikes, calling them "terrorism" and "a violation of sovereignty in Libya". On 19 February, Qatar recalled its ambassador from Cairo in protest against Egypt's unilateral military action, saying it could harm innocent civilians and advantage one side in Libya's conflict.

On 20 February, ISIL operatives detonated three bombs in Al Qubbah, targeting a petrol station, a police station, and the home of parliamentary speaker Agila Salah. These attacks reportedly killed at least 40 people. The U.S. State Department, the Misrata Municipality, and Libya Dawn condemned the attacks.

On 21 February, delegates representing the municipal councils of the cities of Misrata and Zintan met in the town of al-Asabaa and agreed to a prisoner exchange. Also on 21 February, the Misrata Municipal Council created two committees for dialogue, one tasked with the western regions, and the other with the east.

On 22 February, two bombs exploded at the gate of the Iranian ambassador's residence in Tripoli. No casualties were reported.

On 23 February, the Battar brigade, one of the Islamic State's primary military hosts in Libya, issued a statement "damning" the composition of both governments and a multitude of military bodies in the country as "infidels." On the same day, the internationally recognized Tobruk's House of Representatives voted to suspend its participation in UN-brokered talks with the Tripoli government. In response, UNSMIL renewed its call for dialogue.

Divisions and recriminations among jihadists have reportedly surfaced and have been intensifying in January and February 2015. There were conflicting reports about whether Ansar al-Sharia leader Mohamed Al-Zahawi perished fighting against Operation Dignity forces or if he was executed by members of the Islamic State of Iraq and the Levant. The Shura Council of Derna had condemned the Al-Qubbah bombings conducted by the Islamic State, triggering tension between the two groups.

Following the execution of Egyptian Christians by ISIL militants and the subsequent Egyptian intervention into Libya, the Egyptian government had allegedly opened channels of communication with Misratan and Libya Dawn leaders.

=== March 2015, Battle of Sirte (2015) begins ===
On 2 March, the Tobruk-based government named former anti-government General Haftar as its army chief. The next day, two soldiers a military colonel and Al-Qadir, a National Security Directorate) were kidnapped and executed in the same day in Derna. The Barqa Province of the Islamic State claimed responsibility for the attack and other sources suspected that the Abu Salim Martyr's Brigade may have been involved in the killings.

On 14 March, pro-Dawn forces associated with Misrata and Operation Sunrise clashed with ISIL militants in Sirte, which marked the start of Battle of Sirte. Fighting between Libya Dawn forces and ISIL militants was also reported in the Daheera area west of the city of Sirte, and at the Harawa vicinity east of Sirte.

On 15 March, ISIL militants conducted a bomb attack against a police checkpoint in Tripoli, wounding five, and executed a car bomb attack in Misrata near a military camp associated with the 166 battalion, killing one person. The 166 Battalion had been a primary brigade in directing and managing Libya Dawn's confrontations with ISIL forces.

On 18 March, ISIL commander Ahmed Rouissi was killed in the course of combat taking place near Sirte between Libya Dawn forces and ISIL militants. Tunisian officials suspected that he was the mastermind in the murders of two Tunisian opposition leaders in 2013.

On 19 March, military forces associated with the Tripoli-based government reportedly recaptured Nofaliya from ISIL control.

On 20 and 21 March, Zintani and Warshanfana forces clashed with Libya Dawn units in the Aziziya region. Also, on 20 March, the internationally recognized Tobruk-based government stated that they had launched a military operation to "liberate" Tripoli from the GNC Islamist forces (Libya Dawn). As a result, the Tripoli-based GNC government threatened to walk out on the peace talks in the Moroccan resort of Skhirat.

On 25 March, the Tobruk-based government launched an offensive on the city of Derna, to expel ISIL and other militant groups from the city.

On 26 March, the Operation Sunrise forces loyal to the Tripoli-based government and the Petroleum Facilities Guards, led by Ibrahim Jathran and aligned with the Tobruk-based government, reached a deal pertaining to the Sidra Basin area. Both sides agreed to maintain the cease-fire and to intensify focus on fighting ISIL. As a result of the agreement, Sunrise forces withdrew from Bin Jawad and some other former areas that functioned as fronts in its battle with the Petroleum Facilities Guards.

On 30 March, Ansar al-Sharia's general Sharia jurist Abu Abdullah Al-Libi pledged allegiance to ISIL.

On 31 March, Libyan General Khalifa Haftar promised to retake the city of Benghazi from militant groups within a month.

Also, on 31 March, the new GNC of the Tripoli-based government sacked its Prime Minister, Omar al-Hassi. The Tripoli-based government cited dissatisfaction with Omar al-Hassi's performance as the reason for his dismissal, and stated that its first deputy speaker, Khalifa al-Ghowel, will run a caretaker cabinet until a new government is formed within one month.

=== April 2015 ===
On 13 April 2015, the South Korean embassy in Tripoli was attacked by two gunmen, who killed two embassy guards and injured a third person. Hours later, a bomb damaged the gate and a residential building near the Moroccan embassy, although no injuries or deaths were reported. ISIL claimed responsibility for those incidents.

In mid-April, fighting broke out in Tripoli itself on Saturday, 18 April, between Libya Dawn and supporters of Haftar. A pro-Haftar insurgency had been involved in fighting in the eastern suburbs of Tajoura and Fashloum 101 Battalion. The unit's leader, Abdullah Sassi, was captured and possibly killed by Libya Dawn forces.

On 24 April, aircraft associated with the Tripoli-based government struck ISIL targets in Sirte.

On 25 April, as a result of clashes with the Tribes' Army, an element of the Libyan National Army in western Libya, and attendant missile strikes, the Gharyan municipality declared a state of emergency, a mobilization of forces, and a closure of colleges.

=== May 2015 ===
On 11 May, a Turkish cargo ship was shelled by the Libyan Air Force after heading to the port of Derna. It is known that Derna had been under extremist militants since 2014.

On 29 May, eight people were killed and eight others were wounded following a rocket strike by Islamist militants in the city of Benghazi. On the same day, Islamic State fighters captured the Qurdabiya air base south of Sirte after Tripoli aligned troops withdrew from the area.

=== June 2015 ===
On 1 June, a suicide bomber blew himself up outside a checkpoint in the city of Dafniya, killing 5 Libya Dawn militia and injuring 7 others. ISIL issued a statement claiming the attack and declaring war to the coalition.

On 3 June, Islamic State fighters beheaded a Libyan National Army volunteer at the famous Atiq Mosque in Derna. The Islamic state also posted photos of young boys being shown the severed head and bloody body of the victim immediately after the killing.

On 10 June, the Al Qaeda affiliate Shura Council of Derna declared war on ISIL after members of the later allegedly assassinated SCD commander Nasr Akr, nine ISIL militants and two SCD fighters were killed in clashes that followed the incident.

On 12 June, Medfaiyah Wal-Sewarigh ("Artillery and Missiles") Brigade, which is part of the Libya Dawn militias, took 10 diplomatic staff from the Tunisian consulate in Tripoli as hostages. This comes as Tunisian authorities arrest a senior member of Libya Dawn named Walid Al-Ghleib on charges of terrorist offences including supplying Tunisian terrorists with weapons.

On 13 June, the towns of Rigdaleen, Jumayl, Zaltan and Al-Agrabiya agreed with the Libyan National Army to enter these towns peacefully and without any bloodshed. The Libyan National Army took over these towns and secured their facilities. This outcome was a consequence of a peace deal being brokered among cities in western Libya.

On 14 June, the United States announced it had conducted an airstrike on a group associated with al-Qaeda. It was reported that Mokhtar Belmokhtar was the target and that he was killed in the airstrike. The internationally recognized government was consulted in advance, and it confirmed the death of Belmokhtar.

Throughout June, municipal authorities in western Libyan cities have reached a series of agreements to foster peace and de-escalation. These agreements have encompassed and included cities backing opposing sides of the civil war, such as Misrata, Zintan, Kikla, Gharyan, Zuwara, Zawia, Zliten, Rigadaleen, Jumayl, Zaltan, Sabratha, and others, as well as forces engaged in local animosities and tribal conflicts. The terms of the peace and reconciliation accords between cities include the cessation of warfare, prisoner exchanges, the unblocking of roads and critical routes, and the withdrawal of rival armed units back to the administrative borders of their associated cities.

=== July 2015 ===
Military situation in Libya in July 2015

On 1 July, the head of the General National Congress, Nouri Abusahmain, accompanied by Salah Badi, a Libya Dawn militia leader, held a protest outside of the GNC headquarters protesting against the dialogue process. This came as the UNSMIL significantly reduced the role of the State Council, ninety of which are from the General National Congress.

On 12 July, Al-Wushka, a little town 35 kilometers east of Abu Grain, was taken over by the Libyan branch of ISIL, without any resistance from the militant forces that control western Libya. It is known that the Islamic State had been gaining ground west of their stronghold Sirte after militia fighters from Misrata were pushed away from the city. That same day in Morocco, the Libyan factions signed the draft peace deal, but without the participation of the team from the General National Congress who boycotted the meetings because of objections to parts of the text.

=== August 2015 ===
On 1 August, five people were killed in clashes between the Libyan Armed Forces and various Islamist groups. Fighting had been taking place in Ajdabiya, near the oil port of Brega, which included an attack by the Libyan Air Force.

On 13, 38 August residents from the town of Sirte were killed by the Islamic State of Iraq and the Levant, after residents revolted against them in reaction to the killing of an Islamic Salafist Imam who refused to hand over his mosque to the militant extremist group. Among the dead were two children, four elderly and the rest were fighters from the local tribe of Furjan. ISIL threatened to use gas against the civilians unless attacks against it stopped.

On 14 August, multiple airstrikes were conducted on Sirte after the massacre committed by ISIL. The air assault lasted for half an hour targeting multiple areas in Sirte including the town's internal security complex, the Ouagadougou Conference centre, part of the university campus and the Mahari hotel.

=== September 2015 ===
On 10 September, the leader of the Petroleum Faculties Guard, Ibrahim Jadhran, accused the LNA of trying to assassinate him.

On 28 September, Ansar al-Sharia released a message in which the organization denied having pledged allegiance to ISIL or its caliph. Ansar al-Sharia also denied having links with the Tripoli government, which it termed "an apostate government."

=== October 2015 ===
On 1 October, ISIL militants attacked the port of Es Sidr with a gun assault and an attempted car bombing against the defending Petroleum Facilities Guard. Petroleum Facilities Guard reportedly suffered one death and two wounded while ISIL incurred the death of four militants.

On 8 October, the UN envoy heading the internationally backed dialogue process, Bernardino Leon, held a press conference in Morocco in which he announced the names of several potential members of the proposed Government of National Accord. Fayez al-Sarraj, a member of the House of Representatives, was announced as the candidate for the office of prime minister. Three deputy prime ministers were announced, including Ahmed Maetig, Musa Kuni, and Fathi Majbari. Omar Aswad and Mohamed Ammar were declared as two other potential members of a six-person presidential council.

Shortly after the press conference, the Misrata Municipal Council expressed support for the proposed Government of National Accord. Furthermore, an overwhelming preponderance of Misrata's militias have declared support for the plan.

On 23 October, extremist militants, possibly associated with the Islamic State, fired mortar rounds at protesters in Benghazi's Kish Square, killing nine and wounding at least 35.

On 30 October, Martin Kobler, a German diplomat, was appointed to replace Bernardino Leon as U.N. Special Representative and Head of the United Nations Support Mission in Libya.

=== November 2015 ===
Following the appointment of Martin Kobler and the announcement of the impending departure of Bernardino Leon from the U.N., Leon was appointed as director-general of the UAE's diplomatic academy. This job announcement, along with its attendant £35,000 a month salary, led to accusations, particularly by supporters of Libya Dawn and the Tripoli-based government, that Leon's tenure as U.N. envoy had been tainted by bias and partiality. These accusations were reinforced by allegedly leaked emails which purported to reveal collusion between Leon and the UAE to divide the forces backing the Tripoli government, as well as violations of the U.N. arms embargo by the UAE. Additionally, the Tripoli-based government arrested a UAE national on suspicion of espionage on 11 November.

In 17 November, 44 civilians were kidnapped from an unknown number of road blocks in Tripoli. The civilians were released in two groups of 27 a few hours apart from each other, the authorities attributed the abduction to the Abu Salim Martyrs Brigade.

=== December 2015, signing of the Libyan Political Agreement ===
Efforts to establish peace between the rival governments were made on 16 and 17 December, when the leaders of both governments met in Malta and delegates signed an agreement in Morocco. On 17 December 2015 members of the House of Representatives and the new General National Congress signed the revised political agreement, generally known as the "Libyan Political Agreement" or the "Skhirat Agreement".

Under the terms of the agreement, a nine-member Presidency Council and a seventeen-member interim Government of National Accord were formed, with a view to holding new elections within two years. The House of Representatives was supposed to continue to exist as a legislature and an advisory body, to be known as the High Council of State, was supposed be formed with members nominated by the New General National Congress. On 31 December 2015, Chairman of the House of Representatives, Aguila Saleh Issa declared his support for the Libyan Political Agreement.

Despite this, fighting still continued, with clashes in Ajdabiya killing 14 people.

== 2016 ==
=== January 2016, Fall of Bin Jawad ===
The Fall of Bin Jawad (2016) refers to the ISIL takeover of the Libyan city of Bin Jawad on 4 January 2016 during its oil crescent region campaign. On Monday morning, the terrorist group imposed full control over the city of Bin Jawad in the Sirte District, after a series of intense firefights with rebel forces that were loyal to the Libyan provisional government in Tripoli.

On 7 January, a truck bomb attack targeted a police training center in the coastal city of Zliten, killing at least 47 and wounding scores of people. The incident was one of the deadliest terrorist attacks in Libyan history. Difficulties in treating the huge number of wounded at facilities in Zliten resulted in many patients being transferred to hospitals in Tripoli, Misrata, and Khoms. Another car bomb attack occurred on the same day at the entrance to the oil port of Ras Lanuf, killing multiple people. The Islamic State claimed responsibility for the massacres at Zliten and Ras Lanuf.

On 10 January, ISIL attacked the port of Zueitina by sea with 3 boats. The Port was defended by the Guards of Petrol Installations (GPI) – an armed group linked to the Tobruk Government. Due to the GPI having been warned of the attack, the attack failed, and the GPI seriously damaged one boat, while forcing the others to retreat.

=== February 2016 ===
The U.N.-backed presidential council announced a list of names for ministers of the Government of National Accord on 14 February 2016. The presidential council presented the list of names to the House of Representatives for approval.

A US air raid on a suspected ISIL camp on 19 February near the city of Sabratha killed 49 people, including two Serbian embassy members, who had been taken hostage by the militants on 8 November 2015 from a convoy of cars heading towards the Tunisian border. An ISIL operative named Noureddine Chouchane who is behind the Sousse attacks that left 30 British citizens dead was believed to have been killed in the airstrike.

On 20 February, the Libyan National Army led by Brigadier General Khalifa Haftar launched a citywide assault to capture the city of Benghazi in an operation called "Blood of the Martyrs", with some assistance from French special forces. The Army managed to capture Marisa port which was a key lifeline for terrorists in the city to get supplies from the city of Misrata. The army also managed to take control of Bouatni district south of Benghazi.

On the 21st of the same month, in Benghazi the Libyan National Army also managed to take over the rest of Bouatni, while overrunning Hawari and Leithi districts both of which were strongholds of ISIL and Ansar al-Sharia.

On 23 February, ISIL militants clashed with forces associated with the Sabratha military council inside of Sabratha. These clashes were followed on the same day by an ISIL offensive that allegedly temporarily seized various buildings after penetrating the city. However, local forces conducted a counterattack against the ISIL militants, reportedly driving them out of the city's centre. However, fighting continued in Zawagha district.

=== March 2016 ===
On 6 March, Libyan aircraft based in Misrata conducted airstrikes against Islamic States targets in Sirte. Jamal Zubia, a foreign media spokesman for the Tripoli-based government, claimed that as many as 18 people were killed in the strikes, including senior Islamic State members. A resident in Sirte stated that the air strikes had targeted districts in and around the city, resulting in at least one civilian being killed.

On 10 March, following the airstrikes against targets in Sirte, ISIL militants attacked Misratan forces stationed at the Abu Grain checkpoint, killing three security personnel. Also on 10 March, Zintani forces clashed with suspected ISIL militants who had briefly taken control of a major road about 320 km west of Sirte and 200 km south of the capital, Tripoli. One member of the Zintani Brigades was injured before the militants retreated.

On 12 March, the Presidential Council of the U.N.-backed Government of National Accord issued a statement urging all Libyan institutions to begin a transfer of authority to the unity government. It also called upon the international community to cease all dealings with alternative governments. In the statement, the Presidential Council asserted that a document signed by a majority of the HOR's members expressing support for the new government, in addition to the endorsement by other political figures, conferred legitimacy on the Government of National Accord.

On 15 March, Haithem Tajouri, the commander of the Tripoli Revolutionaries' Brigade, seized control of the Hall of the People facility. Subsequently, on 16 March, Tajouri expressed support for a return of monarchy in Libya and had the Qaddafi-era Hall of the People plastered with pro-monarchy posters.

On 16 March the European Union agreed to implement sanctions, travel bans, and asset freezes, on Nouri Abusahmain, the president of the Tripoli-based new GNC, Khalifa al-Ghwell, the new GNC's prime minister, and Aguila Saleh, the president of the Tobruk-based House of Representatives. The European Union cited these three political leaders as being "spoilers" obstructing implementation of the U.N-backed plan of resolution to the Libya conflict and the associated Government of National Accord.

During an interview on 17 March, Fayez al-Sarraj, the Prime Minister of the U.N/internationally supported Government of National Accord, declared that his government would move into Tripoli "within a few days." Seraj also stated, in the same interview, that his government's security plan included agreements with police, military forces, and some armed groups in Tripoli that would enable the Government of National Accord to ensconce itself in the capital.

On 24 March, the Tripoli-based new GNC declared a state of emergency in response to reports that four members of the Government of National Accord had entered Tripoli.

On 30 March, various members of the Presidential Council, including Prime Minister Fayez Serraj, arrived at a naval base in a Tripoli after travelling from Tunisia on a boat.

On 31 March, the Libya Herald reported that top officials from the new GNC, under heavy pressure and warnings from former supporters, had dispersed back to their home cities. GNC Prime Minister Khalifa Ghwell, Sheik Sadeq al-Ghariani, GNC President Abu Sahmain, GNC Media Department head Jamal Zubia, and military commander Salah Badi were reported as having left Tripoli.

Also on 31 March, the Presidency Council's Temporary Security Committee reportedly took control of the prime ministry facilities on the Sikka Road. Additionally, ten coastal cities in western Libya announced support for the Government of National Accord through the Sabratha municipality's official Facebook page.

At the end of March, the mayors of Sabratha, Zultan, Rigdaleen, Al-Jmail, Zuwarah, Ajilat, Sorman, Zawia, as well as those of West and South Zawia, issued a joint statement endorsing the Government of National Accord.

=== April 2016 ===
On 2 April, the National Oil Corporation stated that it would work with the Presidential Council.

On 3 April, the municipality of Bani Walid announced support for the Presidential Council and the Government of National Accord.

Political and military authorities in al-Hawamid declared support for the Presidential Council and the Government of National Accord on 3 April.

On 4 April, Tunisia declared plans to reopen its embassy in Tripoli.

On 5 April, the National Salvation Government associated with the General National Congress announced that it was resigning, "ceasing operations," and ceding power to the Presidential Council. Following the dissolution of the GNC, former members of that body declared the establishment of the State Council, as envisaged by the LPA.

On 6 April, the State Council selected Abdurrahman Sewehli as its president and Saleh al-Makhzoum as its First Deputy. On the same day, Saleh al-Makhzoum stated that the Presidential Council, utilizing its powers as Commander-in-chief, would soon announce the leadership of the Libyan army, in cooperation with House of Representatives and the State Council. Furthermore, he suggested that a resolution for the controversy pertaining to article 8 of the LPA would be achieved.

On 17 April, the Libyan National Army managed to crush extreme militants in and around the University of Benghazi, where militants had taken it a ground for them to launch rockets at the city and train their followers.

On 18 April, the Libyan Army managed to capture the Al-Hawari cement factory and the adjoining two cemeteries. They later overrun the entire district of Al-Hawari south west of the city, this however came at a cost of five soldiers' lives and a senior commander named later as Abdul Hamid Boker.

Also on 18 April, a meeting of the House of Representatives was set to convene to vote on the issue of acceptance or rejection of the Government of National Accord, but the planned session was derailed by Aquila Saleh, the Speaker of the House Representatives, and a minority bloc within the parliament which opposes the GNA. Several previous and subsequent attempts to hold a vote on the GNA have been unsuccessful.

On 19 April, the Libyan National Army together with Al-Saiqa special forces were able to seize control of the entire area of Al-Quwarsha.

On 20 April, the Libyan National Army's Omar Mukhtar Operation Room which covers Derna and the areas surrounding the region, were able to take control of the south eastern suburb of Fataieh and an area called District 400 following a new ground and air offensive.

The Presidential Council, on 20 April, congratulated the LNA and the Derna Mujaheddin Shura Council for their successes against ISIL in Benghazi and Derna.

On 23 April, the Petroleum Facilities Guard clashed with ISIL militants near the Brega oil terminal, resulting in the death of one PFG member and several wounded. Ibrahim Jathran, the leader of the Petroleum Facilities Guard, was injured in the fighting.

On 28 April, Prime Minister Faiez Serraj issued a prerecorded television address during which he stated that he had tasked his government's Defense Minister, Mahdi Barghathi, with assembling a joint command and a joint operations room for the recapture of Sirte from ISIL. Serraj declared that the forces for the operation would be drawn up of military units from across the country.

=== May 2016, start of Battle of Sirte (2016) ===
Military situation in Libya in May 2016

On 3 May, the town of Zella saw clashes between militants of the Ziyad Belaam's Omar Mukhtar Brigade on one side, reportedly backed by air strikes, and the Libyan National Army on the other. A Misratan official alleged that the LNA forces battling Belaam's brigade were fighters from the Justice and Equality Movement, a Sudanese rebel group, however no specific evidence was found of such accusations. Belaam's forces retreated about 30 kilometres away from the town.

On 5 May, ISIL militants staged a preemptive offensive against GNA-allied forces in Abu Grein and other areas in central Libya. The attacks involved use of vehicle-borne improvised explosive devices (VBIEDs), as well as the capture of a number of towns and villages. The initial ISIL assault was followed in the subsequent days by the organization's use of additional VBIED attacks.

On 6 May, shells fired by militants, possibly associated with ISIL, in Kish Square killed and wounded a number of individuals participating in a pro-LNA demonstration in Kish Square of Benghazi. The Presidential Council and Mansour Al-Hassadi of the State Council condemned the assault as a terrorist attack.

On 7 May, GNA-affiliated units reportedly recaptured a bridge checkpoint in Sadada from ISIL. Also on 7 May, Muhammad Al-Ghersy, the spokesman of the recently established Joint Operations Room of the Central Region, declared in a presser that the Joint Operations Room had begun preparing for expanded military actions against the ISIL presence in and around Sirte.

On 9 May, the Presidential Council announced the formation of the Presidential Guard. The Presidential Guard was intended to function as an elite military force tasked with protecting sovereign institutions such as the Central Bank of Libya. Additionally, it was reported to have a remit to ensure the security of airports, ports, and electricity lines. Membership in the organization was supposed to be drawn from army soldiers, the police, and militiamen.

==== The offensive on Sirte starts ====
The offensive on Sirte launched on 12 May 2016, under the name "Al-Bunyan Al-Marsoos," variously translated as "Impenetrable Wall" or "Solid Foundation." Fighting took place east of Assdada, around 80 km (50 miles) south of Misrata. On 16 May, GNA military forces recaptured Abu Grein from ISIL militants. The next day, the GNA took control over the al-Wishkah district, 25 km from Abu Grein. and eventually reached nearly 50 kilometers from Sirte.

In mid-May, the LNA and Operation Dignity leadership declared the initiation of "Operation Volcano" to purge Derna of the Derna Mujaheddin Shura Council. Subsequently, clashes between the LNA and the DMSC broke out. In response, the Derna Mujaheddin Shura Council announced a general "mobilization" to confront the LNA forces.

On 16 May, military forces associated with the Government of National Accord's central region Joint Operations Room claimed to have recaptured Abu Grein from ISIL militants. This report followed days of intermittent clashes and air strikes.

On 17 May, the military forces of the Government of National Accord declared their control over the al-Wishkah district, 25 km from Abu Grein. The GNA's Joint Operations Room stated that their casualties had been six soldiers killed and seventeen injured in ongoing clashes with ISIL forces, eventually reaching nearly 50 kilometres from Sirte.

The GNA's central region Joint Operations Room had named the anti-ISIL offensive "Al-Bunyan Al-Marsoos," variously translated as "Impenetrable Wall" or "Solid Foundation."

On 22 May, Bashir Abu Thafirah, the Commander of the Ajdabia border sector, announced that a military operations room under the command of the Government of Nation Accord would be formed in two days. He declared that the operations room would cover the area from Ajdabia to Sirte and consist of the Petroleum Facilities Guard, as well as Ajdabia military units and other forces under the command of the Ajdabia border sector military leadership.

On 25 May the Central Bank of Libya's parallel eastern branch based in Bayda and representing the House of Representatives and Al-Thani government announced the printing of new banknotes to be put into circulation by June. According to the Central Bank's claimed governor Ali Al-Hibri, these 50LYD and 20LYD that amount to 4 billion LYD were printed in Russia. The following day the Presidential Council announced that these printed banknotes were to be considered invalid and shortly after the United States' embassy in Libya, based in Tunis, announced through social media postings that they would consider these banknotes counterfeit.

In late May next stage of the Battle of Sirte (2016) began, pro-GNA military forces seized many locations near the city of Sirte from ISIL. Operation Al-Bunyan Al-Marsoos forces reported the capture of the Sirte power station and also its advance on the town of Jarif to the south of Sirte.

Also in late May, the eastern front of Sirte saw action. The Petroleum Facilities Guard reported the capture of Bin Jawad and Noufiliyah from ISIL.

=== June 2016 ===
In June, clashes continued in Sirte between the military forces of the Government of National Accord and ISIL. Fighting on 21 June left 36 dead and 100 wounded, with sectors of the 700 district being cleared of snipers and with the broadcasting and electrical company headquarters being captured by government forces. According to reports, Colonel Al-Mahdi Al-Barghathi, the government's minister of defense, is personally overseeing the operation to take Sirte, and British and French special forces are fighting alongside the Libyan loyalist army units to retake the city.

=== July 2016 ===
On 15 July 2016, the "Defense for Benghazi Brigades", an anti-Haftar militia, sponsored by Sadiq Al-Ghariani, captured the village of El Magrun, south of Benghazi. But the army recaptured it on 19 July, and on 20 July, captured El Jlaidiya (53 north of Ajdabiya) Three French special forces soldiers were killed on 20 July when their helicopter was shot down near Benghazi, just hours after the country officially confirmed its presence on the ground.

=== August 2016 ===
On 1 August, the United States air forces led air strikes (co-ordinated with the unity government in Tripoli) against ISIL positions in Sirte.

On 4 August, a suicide bombing targeted the Libyan army at al-Guwarsha (a southern gate of Benghazi) resulted in 23 killed, 54 wounded.

The House of Representatives on 22 August rejected the GNA's government with most members of the parliament voting against the government in a motion of no confidence.

In August 2016, The Siege of Derna began.

=== October 2016 ===
On 14 October 2016, forces loyal to GNC took over the building of the High Council of State and announced the restoration of Ghawi cabinet. Then, clashes occurred between Sarraj loyalists and Ghawi loyalists. Later, forces loyal to Ghawil sent reinforcements to protect the parliament building.

Ghwail forces also seized the Government Palace.

On 16 October, the Presidential Guard pledged allegiance to GNA. On 17 October, Ghwail said on TV that GNC fully control of the capital. Clashes between Ghawil forces and policemen occurred.

=== November 2016 ===
On 5 November 2016, GNS seized Al Khums.

=== December 2016, Battle of Sirte (2016) ends ===
On 1 December, Omar al-Hassi announced the formation of the High Council of Revolution, who is a parallel executive body.

On 2 December, clashes occurred between two of the city's largest and most heavily armed militias and an alliance of hard-line Islamists allied with militias loyal to rival political authorities. On 3 December, an agreement for a ceasefire had been found.

Sirte was declared to be cleared of ISIL loyalists on 6 December after over 6 months of fighting, depriving the group of their remaining urban stronghold in Libya.

== 2017 ==
=== January 2017 ===
Field Marshal Haftar met with Russian military officials aboard the aircraft carrier Admiral Kuznetsov, which was on its way to Syria. There they reportedly discussed the possibility of supplying weapons to the Libyan National Army.

On 18 January, Two USAF B-2 bombers dropped around 100 bombs on two ISIL camps 28 miles south of Sirte in Libya, killing 90 terrorists. A U.S. defense official said that "This was the largest remaining ISIL presence in Libya" and that "They have been largely marginalized but I am hesitant to say they've been completely eliminated in Libya."

=== February 2017 ===
Prime Minister Fayez al-Sarraj stated in late February that he hopes Russia will serve as a mediator between the GNA and the government in Tobruk.

=== March 2017, Gulf of Sidra Offensive and Counteroffensive ===
On 2 March, GNA vice premier Ahmed Maiteeq and foreign minister Mohamed Taha Siala met with Russian Foreign Minister Sergei Lavrov in Moscow. There they discussed solving the Libyan crisis, including the possibility of dialogue between the GNA and the House of Representatives.

On 3 March, the Islamist-dominated Benghazi Defense Brigades launched an offensive, capturing a strip of territory between the oil ports of Nofaliya and Ras Lanuf from the Libyan National Army, and then handing this territory over to the Government of National Accord. Since 7 March, LNA forces in Brega started preparing for a counterattack, and the Tobruk government had backed out of the UN-brokered deal with the Tripoli government, calling for fresh elections to be held.

On 9 March, after obtaining endorsement from tribal elders in Benghazi, the LNA launched a counteroffensive in the Oil Crescent, with armoured brigades being sent to the area. The following day, it was reported that airstrikes had targeted Sidra and Ras Lanuf, and that heavy fighting had broken out in Uqayla, a small town located on the frontline.

On the night of 11 March, airstrikes conducted by the Dignity Operation warplanes killed two of the Petroleum Facilities Guard (PFG) personnel, sources from the PFG reported.

On 14 March, LNA recaptured all positions lost to Benghazi Defence and Misratan Brigades in a counter-offensive after several days of air bombardment. According to local sources, 21 LNA soldiers were killed during the fighting. Meanwhile, LNA spokesman, Ahmed Al-Mismari claimed that remnants of the BDB had fled to Misrata and Jufra.

=== April 2017 ===
On 11–12 April, at least six soldiers from the LNA and pro-GNA forces have been killed in a skirmish. In late April a meeting took place between representatives of the GNA and the Tobruk government in Rome, presided by the Italian foreign minister, and they have agreed to prevent fighting between themselves.

=== May 2017 ===
On 2 May, Marshal Haftar met with Prime Minister Sarraj in Abu Dhabi, where they had a two-hour meeting, which was described as having made progress. During a press conference in Algiers, foreign minister Mohamed Taha Siala stated that the GNA will recognize Marshal Haftar as the supreme commander of the Libyan army if he recognizes the GNA instead of the House of Representatives. This statement caused criticism in Tripoli.

=== July 2017, end of the Battle of Benghazi ===
The Libyan National Army defeated the remaining Islamist forces, ending the nearly three year long Battle of Benghazi.

On 30 July, according to analysts, ISIL was reported to be taking advantage of the instability in Libya to regroup there after a steady loss of its territory in Syria and Iraq.

=== September 2017 ===
On 22 September, the US military conducted 6 airstrikes with unmanned aircraft on an ISIL camp 150 miles southeast of Sirte, killing 17 ISIL militants and destroying three vehicles. It was also reported in an AFRICOM statement that the strikes took place "In coordination with Libya's Government of National Accord and aligned forces" and that "The camp was used by ISIL to move fighters in and out of the country; stockpile weapons and equipment; and to plot and conduct attacks". The strikes marked the first time airstrikes had been carried out by the United States under the Donald Trump administration.

=== October 2017 ===
On 29 October, US special operations forces captured Mustafa al-Imam, for his alleged role in the 2012 Benghazi attacks, an official said that once captured he was moved to a US Navy ship offshore and will be transferred to the US for federal prosecution; Libyan authorities were informed of the mission in advance.

=== November 2017 ===
Fox News reported that on 17 November, a drone strike in the desert of central Libya Friday killed several ISIL militants.

On 24 November, armed militants raided a water pipeline station in Shwayrif, Jabal al Gharbi. The attack don´t left casualties, but the water supply was shut off. This attack t is similar to other attacks that occurred in previous months.

=== December 2017 ===
On 17 December, General Khalifa Haftar declared the "so-called" Shkirat agreement void and threatened to claim the presidency if there were no elections.

== 2018 ==
=== January 2018 ===
On 15 January, Tripoli International Airport was forced to close due to being attacked by militants

=== February 2018 ===
On 26 February, The UN imposed sanctions on Libya, Intent on blocking oil smuggling.

=== March 2018 ===
On 24 March, The United States conducted its first Airstrike against Al-qaeda in Libya.

=== April 2018 ===
On 11 April, while Operation Dignity forces started preparing for the assault on besieged Derna it was reported in many newspapers worldwide that General Khalifa Haftar suffered a severe brain stroke and had reportedly been taken to a hospital in Paris. On 26 April after nearly three weeks of absence Khalifa Haftar finally returned to Benghazi after his medical trip to Paris.

=== May 2018, Start of the Battle of Derna (2018) ===
Battle of Derna (2018)

See: Battle of Derna (2018)

On 2 May, two ISIL fighters attacked the High National Election Commission headquarters in Tripoli before bombing themselves after being surrounded by police resulting in at least 12 deaths.

On 7 May, Khalifa Haftar announced the start of the Battle of Derna (2018).

On 18 May, Fayez al-Sarraj ordered the commanders of the military of Tripoli the western and central regions to prepare their forces within ten days to form a unit tasked with protecting and securing the South in response to the LNA's offensive on Derna.

On 29 May, Hoping to end the conflict, Various Libyan rival leaders such as Fayez al-Sarraj, Khalifa Haftar, Aguila Saleh Issa, and Khalid al-Mishri agreed to hold the next election in December 2018.

=== June 2018, End of the Battle of Derna (2018), Ibrahim Jadhran captures oil terminals ===
On 13 June, While the Battle of Derna was going on, Remnants of the Benghazi Defense Brigades led by Ibrahim Jadhran, former member of the Petroleum Facilities Guard, launched the Gulf of Sidra Offensive (2018), took over the oil terminals at Ras Lanuf and Al-Sidra from the House of Representatives, killing 14 LNA members while losing 20. The Libyan National Army retaliated with Airstrikes on 16 June, – LNA spokesman Ahmed al-Mismari accused Qatar of having aided the rebels. By 21 June, The Benghazi Defense Brigades had been defeated. On 28 June, After 7 weeks and 3 days of fighting, The Battle of Derna (2018) ended.

=== July 2018 ===
In July, after the end of the Battle of Derna (2018), clashes between the Libyan National Army and the Derna Protection Force continued.

=== August 2018, Start of the Battle of Tripoli (2018) ===
Military situation in Libya in November 2018

See: Battle of Tripoli (2018)

On 7 August, the spokesperson for the LNA, Ahmed Al-Mismari, requested a Russian intervention in Libya, similar to the one in Syria.

On 27 August, the Battle of Tripoli erupted in the capital between various militias.

=== September 2018, end of the Battle of Tripoli (2018) ===
On 11 September, ISIL carried out an attack in Tripoli against the National Oil Corporation.

On 20 September, the Battle of Tripoli continued, breaking a ceasefire declared the month before.

On 25 September, a ceasefire was signed, ending the Battle of Tripoli.

=== November 2018, Palermo Conference ===
In November, major Libyan political figures attended the Palermo Conference in an attempt to resolve the Libyan conflict.

=== December 2018, Battles of Saddada Castle and Traghen ===
In December 2018, the LNA made a series of advances into Misrata District. They engaged the Sirte Protection Force in the Battle of Saddada Castle, and engaged a Chadian armed group in the Battle of Traghen.

== 2019 ==
=== January 2019, Southern Libya Offensive ===
On 16 January, The LNA began an offensive to the south in a bid to secure oil fields.

In January, Sabha was captured by the LNA after the Battle of Sabha.

=== April 2019, Western Libya Offensive ===
On 3 April, the LNA launched a surprise offensive in western Libya, moving in the direction of Tripoli. It encountered only light resistance and was able to take control of the city of Gharyan to the south of the capital. The mayor of the town stated that the LNA was moving into positions to the south of Tripoli. A spokesman for the LNA made a statement that Field Marshal Khalifa Haftar issued orders to form an operations room that will be tasked with 'liberating the western region from terrorists'. The LNA also released photos allegedly showing their peaceful takeover of the town of Mizda. A local resident of Ras Lanouf stated that he had seen LNA tanks and military convoys also heading towards GNA-controlled Sirte. The LNA had very recently been redeploying forces that previously fought in the country's south to locations near Sirte. The Tripoli-based Government of National Accord reacted to the offensive by issuing orders for an immediate general mobilization.

On 5 April, the LNA marched toward Tripoli from several directions, reaching the city's outskirts after receiving orders to capture the city. The LNA reported asserting control over the town of Azizia. It then proceeded to advance on the capital, confirming its intent to capture it. The LNA also briefly captured a key checkpoint, known as Gate 27, on the road between Tripoli and Tunisia, but withdrew overnight. The head of the GNA Presidential Council, Faiz Al-Sarraj, ordered the air units loyal to the GNA to use force against the LNA, in order to "counter threats to civilians". The GNA interior ministry also ordered all of its forces to be placed on maximum alert. The United Nations Security Council had scheduled an emergency meeting on the same day to discuss the recent developments in Libya. Later in the day the LNA reported capturing the town of Suq Al-Khamis, located 20 km south of Tripoli, after clashes with pro-GNA militias. Meanwhile, the leader of the LNA, Field Marshal Khalifa Haftar, met with UN Secretary General António Guterres in the former's office in Tobruk.

6 April

On 6 April, the LNA air force declared western Libya a no-fly zone and began to engage GNA targets, after GNA jets targeted LNA positions in Mizdah and Suq al-Khamis. The LNA reported recapturing Gate 27, as well as asserting control over Salah al-Din and Ain Zara neighbourhood in southern Tripoli, after pro-GNA militias surrendered to the LNA. By nightfall forces loyal to the GNA launched a counterattack on the airport in southern Tripoli, which was repelled by the advancing LNA, according to Haftar.

7 April

A US military contingent and a contingent of Indian Central Reserve Police Force peacekeepers were evacuated from Tripoli.

Colonel Mohamed Gnounou, the GNA military spokesman, announced that they started a counteroffensive to reclaim the territories in Tripoli taken by the LNA, dubbed "Operation Volcano of Anger". The UN mission in Libya asked for a two-hour ceasefire in south Tripoli to evacuate civilians.

In an official declaration, the Ministry of Health of the GNA declared their casualties at 21 dead and 27 wounded.

The LNA conducted an airstrike against a GNA position in southern Tripoli, the Bab al-Azizia military compound, the first LNA airstrike to target a part of the city. It is thought that Haftar had a superior air force, supplied by the United Arab Emirates, although the Libyan Air Force is nominally loyal to the GNA.

By the end of the day, an LNA spokesman, Major General al-Mesmari, reported that the LNA reached the Fernaj neighbourhood of Tripoli and are advancing through the eastern neighbourhoods of the city.

8 April

The GNA airforce launched an air strike on the early hours of Monday on al-Watiyah, the only airbase captured by LNA since the launch of the operation, located 130 kilometres (80 miles) southeast of Tripoli.

As part of the Operation Volcano of Anger launched by GNA, Mistrata militias mobilized on the frontlines of Tripoli to prevent the LNA from capturing it.

The LNA withdrew from Tripoli International Airport after clashes with the GNA. Fighting over the airport continued after the withdrawal.

The LNA reported capturing Yarmouk Military Camp in southern Tripoli. The LNA used BM-21 Grad MRLs against GNA positions in retaliation for GNA airstrikes. GNA-held Mitiga International Airport was repeatedly hit by LNA airstrikes, reportedly originating from what appeared to be Mikoyan-Gurevich MiG-21 jets based at al-Watiya airbase in western Libya. The airport was closed after the raid. At the time it closed, Mitiga was the only functioning airport in Tripoli.

Atef Braqeek, the commander of the Tripoli Protection Forces, declared that the group was in full control of al-Hira and Aziziyah.

According to Libya al-Ahrar TV as cited by The Libya Observer, a team of French "military experts" arrived in Gharyan and created a "control room to monitor the attack on Tripoli".

9 April

The LNA targeted positions of the GNA near Tripoli International Airport with airstrikes. Shortly thereafter, the LNA air force bombed a GNA site in Warshavana, western Tripoli. Fighting resumed near Tripoli International Airport. Several more LNA airstrikes continued hitting the airport during the afternoon clashes. It was reported that the airport closed on 8 April, after it was bombed by the GNA, and also that the Misrata Airport, located 200 km (125 miles) to the east down the coast, was the nearest airport for Tripoli residents. A GNA spokesperson claimed that the GNA air force carried out several raids against LNA supply lines. LNA and GNA forces engaged in a battle for control over the road to Tripoli Int'l Airport and Qasir bin Gashir detention center, which at that time housed over 600 people. By the end of the day, the LNA military information division stated that they have taken back control of Tripoli International Airport, as well as captured the neighbourhoods of al-Tueish, al-Sawani and most of Ain Zara.

10 April

The GNA reported bombing LNA targets within the LNA-held town of Gharyan. The LNA announced that they have captured the 4th Brigade Headquarters in the town of Azizya after fierce fighting with the GNA. The UNHCR attempted to evacuate detained refugees from the Qasir bin Gashir detention center, after it became stuck in crossfire between the two sides. Reports suggest most detainees were transferred to Sekah Road detention center, but around 120 people were left behind and were still in the Qasir bin Gashir detention center by the morning. During the afternoon, the LNA air force conducted an airstrike against GNA targets near Tripoli airport. By sunset, LNA spokesperson, Brigadier General Ahmed al-Mismari, stated that the LNA have secured al-Yarmouk camp and are advancing toward the Dabali military camp. He also reported that the LNA have arrested pro-GNA "African mercenaries" at Tripoli International Airport. Shortly thereafter, al-Mismari stated that the LNA has shot down a GNA Aero L-39 Albatros that attempted to relocate from Misrata to Tripoli.

11 April

The Chief of the GNA Tripoli Military Zone, Major General Abdul-Basit Marwan, stated that the LNA were shelling GNA positions in southern Tripoli with BM-21 Grad MRLs. The GNA claimed several airstrikes on LNA targets in Suq al-Khamis and Tarhuna city. The LNA retaliated by launching an airstrike on GNA targets in the contested Ayn Zara region. A GNA spokesman reported that the GNA have recaptured Wadie Alrabie, Bridge 27, Bridge of Souq Al-Ahad and Tripoli International Airport. Brigadier General Al-Mismari, LNA spokesperson, reported that the "things on the ground are in favour of the [Libyan National] army," adding that they have seized 14 GNA armoured vehicles and tanks, positioning themselves a mere 2 km from Tripoli's city centre after a GNA retreat. He stated that Tripoli Int'l Airport is "still a fire zone," but did not comment on who controlled it at that time. He also promised to "surprise everyone" with a plan to seize all of Tripoli. By nightfall, the GNA claimed that it negotiated the surrender of soldiers belonging to the LNA 8th brigade in Ayn Zara, after they were left without fuel or ammunition for more than a day. The LNA shelled the contested town of Al Swatani. An LNA spokesman stated that the Libyan National Army had issued an arrest warrant for Fayez al-Sarraj, head of the GNA.

12 April

The LNA conducted an airstrike against the GNA in Abdel Samad Camp, south of Zuwarah. Heavy gunfire and explosions were reported from downtown Tripoli. The LNA stated that they have received major military reinforcements, that they have killed dozens of GNA fighters in the previous day's offensive, and that the LNA 9th brigade is advancing in the Al-Khalla region. It also reported that several young GNA fighters defected to the LNA. The LNA air force conducted air raids against GNA targets in Wadi Al Rabie, south of Tripoli. In the late afternoon, the LNA conducted airstrikes against a GNA military camp, as well as an arms cache in the North-East Tripoli neighbourhood of Tajura. Explosions were reported at GNA-held Mitiga International Airport. Conflicting reports emerged as to whether they were from an LNA airstrike on the airport or as a result of GNA anti-aircraft guns firing. The LNA claimed that residential houses and civilian buildings in LNA-held suburbs of Tripoli were subjected to bombardment by the GNA. LNA spokesman, Brigadier General Al-Mismari, accused former President of Sudan, Omar al-Bashir, of sending two planes loaded with 28 fighters, as well as a large amount of weapons and ammunition, from Khartoum to GNA-held Mitiga International Airport on 28 March. Fathi Bashagha, Interior Minister of the Presidential Council, stated on 12 April that the UAE sent military equipment to the LNA at Benina International Airport in Benghazi. The UNHCR called for the release and evacuation of detained refugees held in wartorn areas. The UNHCR confirmed that 728 people were still trapped in the contested Qasir Bin Gashir detention center, stating that it attempted to evacuate them to the Zintan detention center the previous day. The detainees refused to go, insisting that they be evacuated out of Libya.

13 April

Speaker of the Tobruk-based House of Representatives, Aguila Saleh Issa, called for a partial lifting of the international arms embargo imposed on Libya, to allow countries to legally arm the Libyan National Army. He stated that the Tobruk-based government intends to hold elections after capturing Tripoli. The LNA conducted several airstrikes on GNA targets in the southern party of the city, amid intense street battles between the two sides. The World Health Organization delivered medical kits to local hospitals, but cautioned that Tripoli only had enough medical supplies for two weeks. GNA forces once again took control of Al-Yarmouk camp.

14 April

The LNA issued a statement, reporting that internationally designated terrorist groups were fighting alongside the GNA in Tripoli. The GNA Presidential Council denied the claims. A GNA plane targeted an LNA military post in Southern Tripoli. President of Egypt, Abdel Fattah el-Sisi, met with LNA Field Marshal Khalifa Haftar in Cairo. An intensification of LNA air force activity was reported, with LNA Mi-35 helicopters and Su-22 bombers targeting numerous GNA positions in Azizya, Wadi Al Rabie, the 4th Brigade HQ, Al Sawani, Ayn Zara and Tajura. The LNA reportedly made advances toward the center of Tripoli, as well as Salah Al-Din. The LNA recaptured Yarmouk camp, as well as several other military camps in the area and is positioning itself toward capturing the Green Plateau of Tripoli. The LNA was reported to have taken control of Spring Valley Bridge in the south of the capital. The LNA sent military reinforcements to Ra's Lanuf and Es Sider oil ports, in anticipation of a counter-attack by the GNA. A LNA warplane crashed in southern Tripoli. The GNA claimed to have shot it down. A video was later released allegedly showing missiles being fired at the plane, with one hitting the aircraft. Images released from local residents purported to show both the pilot and co-pilot successfully ejecting from the aircraft and deploying their parachutes. LNA Brigadier General Al-Mismari confirmed that the aircraft was shot down by a missile, fired by GNA forces from a suburb of Tripoli. He added that the pilot was alive and in good health. He also accused a GNA militia commander of planning to bring over 350 mercenaries to the capital to fight the LNA. Detainees at the contested Qasir bin Gashir detention center told Al Jazeera that they have been abandoned by their GNA guards since the previous day and were left to fend for themselves in the crossfire. They stated that there were still 728 detained refugees residing in the camp. They accused the GNA of subjecting them to "years of much torture and suffering", reiterating their desire to leave the country entirely.

15 April

Heavy clashes were reported between LNA and GNA forces in Tripoli's Ayn Zara suburb. The LNA military information division stated that "large reinforcements" had arrived in LNA-controlled Gharyan and were preparing to join the assault on the capital. A GNA official claimed that more than 3 million books were destroyed as a result of shelling on a building belonging to the Libyan ministry of education. Both sides accused each other of the attack. A new spokesperson for the GNA Presidential Council (the previous spokesman, who was born in Eastern Libya, was replaced without explanation) accused foreign governments and "statelets" of plotting to cause instability in Libya. He claimed that GNA forces were "constantly advancing on all axes", managing to "defeat the aggressor force" and that they were able to "inflict on the [LNA] aggressor militias huge casualty." He also accused the LNA of various war crimes. GNA head, Fayez al-Sarraj, vowed to have all LNA leaders and commanders involved in the offensive prosecuted.

16 April

A video broadcast by Sky News showed GNA forces retreating, after being targeted by the LNA with heavy weapons. The LNA accused pro-GNA militias from Tripoli and Misrata of intentionally targeting civilian buildings with BM-21 Grad MRLs, in order to turn public opinion against the LNA. The LNA also released a video allegedly showing a residential house being destroyed by a GNA barrel bomb airstrike from a warplane originating from GNA-held Misrata Airport. GNA forces reportedly retook control of the Al-Zahra bridge in southern Tripoli. Reports emerged of heavy clashes between GNA and LNA forces near Azizya. Several hours prior, a GNA commander had claimed that the GNA had full control over the area. After sunset, Tripoli was subjected to a massive bombardment of artillery shells and missiles for several hours, targeting most areas of the city in what is reported to be the most violent bombardment the city had seen in the current civil war. Pro-GNA media reported that at least 4 civilians had died by midnight, with over 20 more being wounded. The GNA blamed the LNA for the attack. The LNA stated that they had launched no missiles that day and that the bombardment was caused by pro-GNA militias, whom they earlier accused of undertaking a campaign to turn public opinion against the LNA through the use of indiscriminate bombardment. The UN envoy to Libya called the event a "terrible night for Tripoli". A UN spokesperson noted that the attack displaced over 4,500 people – the largest single day displacement since the beginning of the war. The spokesperson strongly condemned the attack, stating it may constitute a war crime, but did not assign blame to either party.

17 April

Two GNA soldiers were killed by an LNA airstrike on Tripoli's Ayn Zara suburb. The GNA air force bombed a medical post in Qasir bin Gashir. The LNA was reported to have taken up positions 50 kilometres (50,000 m) to the east of Sirte. The GNA conducted an airstrike on Wadi Al Rabea, a suburb south of Tripoli. No casualties or damage is reported. The LNA's 201st battalion received reinforcements in the south of the city.

18 April

Heavy clashes occurred between GNA and LNA forces, after GNA units attempted to advance towards the Saadiya area. The LNA air force conducted multiple airstrikes on GNA targets in the area. LNA jets also conducted several air raids against GNA targets in Libya's Wadi al Rabie suburb.

20 April

LNA drone aircraft, allegedly supplied by UAE, have struck the GNA military camp in Sabaa district, south of Tripoli city center.

24 April

The LNA advanced towards central Tripoli amid day-long clashes and retreat of GNA militias.

In mid-April, Henrietta Fore, Executive Director of UNICEF, and Virginia Gamba, the United Nations Special Representative for Children and Armed Conflict, issued a joint statement to show their worries about children caught in the middle of fighting in Libya.

=== May ===
In May, the Emirati military, led by its Deputy Supreme Commander and Abu Dhabi's Crown Prince Mohammed bin Zayed Al Nahyan, claimed that 'extremist militias' had been in control of the Libyan capital, which Khalifa Hafter had been warring to take control of from the forces loyal to the nation's internationally recognized government. Since the offensive began in Libya almost 376 people have lost their lives.

On 19 May, assailants attacked the Great Man-Made River Project and cut of the water supply to Tripoli, Libya. The attack no left casualties, but the attack cut off the supply of water in the city.

=== September ===
21 September

The Government of National Accord (GNA) announced that a residential area in Tripoli became a target to drones from the UAE. The attack in al-Hadaba area caused severe injuries to several members of a family.

=== October ===
1 October

Khalifa Haftar's forces, backed by the UAE, launched artillery shells on Mitiga Airport in Tripoli, according to sources from Burkan Al-Ghadab Operation, or Operation Volcano of Anger of the Libyan Army under the GNA command.

6 October

Airstrikes on Misrata Airport by the foreign warplanes, backed by the LNA, injured one member of staff and damaged two airplanes, said media office of Volcano of Rage Operation. Air-raids by Khalifa Haftar's warplanes targeted the Equestrian School in Janzour, west of Tripoli. The attack wounded at least three children and one old man, along with killing a couple of horses.

7 October

The Government of National Accord (GNA) claimed that UAE's drones carried out attacks in Gharyan on south of capital Tripoli. Forces loyal to Haftar had also launched an offensive on the city in August 2019 to take control from the GNA.

15 October

Both UNICEF and European Union expressed "sadness and shock" at the killing of children and their mother during the airstrike by Haftar's forces on Al-Furnaj area in Tripoli.

19 October

Mohammed Gununu, spokesperson for the Libyan Army under the command of GNA, claimed that a Wing Loong drone, supplied by the UAE to Haftar's forces, was shot down in Misurata.

=== November ===
14 November

Khalifa Haftar visited the UAE to meet Abu Dhabi’s top officials, including Aguila Saleh Issa and Aref Ali Nayed. The meeting aimed at reaching a common ground between Haftar, Aguila Saleh and Aref Ali Nayed to replace the current Interim Government of Abdullah al-Thani in eastern Libya with a new government.

18 November

The GNA alleged that the UAE carried out an airstrike that killed seven people in Tripoli. An Emirati drone targeted a biscuits factory in Wadi Rabie area, and killed two Libyan and five foreign workers. Besides, 15 other workers were wounded. On 29 April 2020, after completing its investigation into the drone attack on the biscuit factory, the HRW stated that the United Arab Emirates’ strike killed eight civilians and injured 27. The group informed that all casualties were inflicted upon civilians, of which seven were Libyans, while 28 were foreign nationals.

== 2020 ==
=== January ===
2 January

The Grand National Assembly of Turkey passed a one year mandate in order to deploy troops to Libya.

5 January

Turkey started to deploy troops to Libya.

6 January

LNA forces captured the port city of Sirte from GNA forces, according to the LNA. A GNA commander acknowledged the loss. Sirte was seized following clashes with the Sirte Protection and Security Force units, which withdrew after being forsaken by Madkhali force-Brigade 604, formed after ISIL was ousted from the city in 2016. LNA forces had launched attacks on Sirte using the UAE drones, which killed several members of the SPSR units.

16 January

Turkish President Recep Tayyip Erdogan officially announced that Turkey had begun to send troops to Libya in support of the GNA. Turkey’s increasing support came days before a summit in Berlin, which was organized to address the Libyan conflict.

17 January

UNHCR claimed that migrants, held in Libyan detention camps, were being recruited to fight on both sides of the civil war. According to the testimonies, some migrant were given an option to stay in the camp indefinitely, or take part in the fighting.

=== February ===
24 February

The United Arab Emirates is suspected to have provided arms to support the Khalifa Haftar-led Libyan National Army; from mid-January 2020 to early March 2020, the UAE is believed to have shipped more than 100 deliveries, totaling about 5,000 metric tons, to Haftar's forces, via aircraft flights some from military bases in the UAE and others from the UAE's airbase in Assab, Eritrea. The contents of the shipments were not known, but are believed to include arms and ammunition, including possible heavier artillery, as well as other materiel, such as communications equipment and other gear. The UN arms embargo on Libya was viewed as ineffective: Moncef Kartas, the retired UN weapons inspector for Libya, said there had been "no respect for the UN arms embargo, absolutely none," which was echoed by UN deputy special envoy for Libya Stephanie Williams.

=== March ===
11 March

The Guardian reported that the UAE "is thought to have sent" to the LNA over 100 deliveries of suspected military supplies by air, totaling 5,000 metric tons of cargo, since mid-January.

24 March

On 24 March 2020, Libya confirmed its first case of coronavirus disease 2019 (COVID-19).

25 March

Fighting escalated following increased bombardment of Tripoli. Residents said it was the worst bombardment in weeks. The UN had specifically condemned 24 March shelling that hit a prison in GNA territory, as well as the previous week's LNA shelling that had killed four young women.

=== April ===
10 April

According to a report by the New Arab newspaper, the United Arab Emirates purchased an advanced Israeli-made missile system for Khalifa Haftar to counter the Turkish drones supplied to the GNA.

13 April

GNA forces seized control of the LNA-held towns of Sorman and Sabratha.

20 April

The Financial Times revealed that two United Arab Emirates based companies shipped approximately 11,000 tonnes of jet fuel to eastern Libya. The shipment, which was worth nearly $5 million, was a major violation of the international arms embargo and was being investigated by the UN panel of experts.

29 April

Ahmed Mismari, the spokesman for Libya's eastern-based forces announced that they will cease fire for Ramadan, after suffering setbacks during weeks of intense fighting against the internationally recognized government. Mismari said in a television broadcast that the ceasefire came at the request of the international community and "friendly countries".

30 April

The GNA responded to Haftar’s unilateral declaration of a ceasefire by rejecting it and saying it will keep fighting.

According to the first quarter report for 2020 calculating civilian casualties in Libya by United Nations Support Mission in Libya (UNSMIL), around 131 people have been victims of death and severe injury between 1 January to 31 March 2020. The reported casualties of 64 deaths and 67 injuries all took place as a result of the ground assault carried out by the LNA with the military backing of the United Arab Emirates.

=== May ===
2 May

The Government of National Accord carried out an air strike on al-Watiya airbase. As per the claims, the attack killed two members of militias and injured five. The municipal government of Sabha announced its support for the Government of National Accord.

4–5 May

Politicians, governors, and activists loyal to the Tripoli government rebelled in the cities of Ghat, Ubari, and Murzuk against Haftar forces.

7 May

Areas around the embassies of Turkey and Italy in Tripoli were reportedly targeted in a shelling. The attack was claimed by the GNA as led by Khalifa Haftar’s forces. Following which, the Turkish forces, backing GNA, warned that it "will deem Haftar’s forces legitimate targets" if attacks on its interests and diplomatic missions in the region persisted. However, a spokesperson for LNA denied the forces being responsible for the attack.

18 May

The GNA recaptured al-Watiya airbase from Haftar's forces, securing much of Libya's western coastline.

20 May

The GNA forces claimed the destruction of 7 Russian-made Pantsir-type air defense systems supplied to the LNA by the UAE in the last 48 hours.

=== June, Central Libya offensive ===
4 June

GNA forces retake full control of Tripoli which had been under siege by the LNA for more than a year. A LNA source stated that forces would be withdrawn from the area.

6 June

GNA forces launched an offensive to capture Sirte from the LNA. Following the GNA’s decision to launch an offensive in Sirte, five airstrikes were said to have been carried out in its outskirts by the air force.

7 June

LNA forces proposed a ceasefire backed by Egypt. However, the GNA rejected the ceasefire as they entered Sirte. Despite this, the attack was pushed back by the LNA, which led to the GNA suffering heavy casualties. The LNA succeeded in decelerating the offensive launched by the GNA forces, due to the advantage it had in terms of air power in central Libya, military sources revealed.

21-22 June

Egypt warns the GNA of military intervention if they take Sirte. The GNA rejects it and calls it a "declaration of war." The United States proposed a ceasefire as Egypt builds an army.

27 June

The GNA calls for the United States and the European Union to impose sanctions on individuals and "mercenaries" such as the Wagner Group, after its National Oil Corporation stated that Russian mercenaries and other foreign actors had forced their way into the Sharara oilfield.

=== July ===
5 July

Unidentified non-Libyan warplanes aligned to the LNA targeted Al-Watiya Air Base. A GNA official in Tripoli acknowledged that the airstrikes destroyed GNA defenses including MIM-23 Hawk and KORAL Electronic Warfare System stationed in the base. The Defense Ministry of Turkey acknowledged that the strikes damaged some of their defense systems. Turkish officials stated that the attack could have been perpetrated by Emirati Dassault Mirage aircraft. Russian military sources added that the attack left 3 MIM-23 Hawk destroyed as well as a radar and an electronic warning system and reiterated that the attack was carried out by Dassault Mirage 2000 aircraft. Other sources indicate only one MIM-23 defense was destroyed. Despite some equipment being destroyed during the attack, no injuries were recorded, according to TRT World.

Following the airstrike, Libya's deputy defense minister after condemning the airstrike, maintained that a strategic retaliatory attack would also be carried out. He further described the attack as an unsuccessful attempt aimed at diverting attention away from the previous triumph that has been achieved by the Libyan Army.

Meanwhile, Turkey sent thousands of Syrian mercenaries to support the GNA, with whom it has signed a maritime deal that would give the country rights over huge amounts of the eastern Mediterranean. This deal was rejected by Turkey’s neighbors. Turkish involvement in Libya angered France and Greece and French Defense Minister Jean-Yves Le Drian warned of new sanctions on Ankara.

The GNA and LNA mobilized forces at the new frontlines between the cities of Misrata and Sirte. Egypt warned that any Turkish-backed effort to take Sirte could lead its army to directly intervene.

14 July

The Libyan National Army has accused Turkey of using drones to bomb irrigation pipes in Sirte, compromising large areas of the farmlands there.

15 July

The United States accused the Wagner Group of laying landmines in and around Tripoli since mid-June and imposed sanctions over its alleged cooperation with Sudan's ousted dictator Omar al-Bashir.

Al Jazeera reported that shop owners in Libya were refusing to accept cash because the GNC said the money is counterfeit. The source of the cash was from the more than a billion dollars' worth of new banknotes that were seized in two shipping containers a couple of months prior in Malta, en routing from the printing works in Moscow to Haftar’s forces in eastern Libya.

31 July

On 31 July 2020, the defense minister of Turkey Hulusi Akar made critical remarks against the UAE’s actions in Libya, where it fights the internationally recognized government in Tripoli. He further cautioned the UAE of its action in the Libyan unrest being monitored and bound to be answerable in the foreseeable future. The Turkish defense minister during his interview also pointed out that the entire actions of Abu Dhabi in Syria is also noted as well.

=== August ===
1 August

On 1 August 2020, the condemnation by Turkish defense minister was met with the counter-criticism by the United Arab Emirates minister of state for foreign affairs, Anwar Gargash, who asked Turkey to stop intervening in Arab affairs via his Twitter account. Bahrain also criticized the statement made by the Turkish defense minister regarding the UAE and portrayed it as hateful. However, Turkey has criticized the remarks made by Bahrain’s foreign ministry concerning Turkey's statement against the UAE.

21 August

On 21 August, the GNA and the LNA both agreed to a ceasefire. Khalifa Haftar, Field Marshal of the LNA, rejected the ceasefire and LNA spokesman Ahmed al-Mismari dismissed the GNA's ceasefire announcement as a ploy.

23 August

On 23 August, street protests took place in Tripoli, where hundreds protested against the GNA for living conditions and corruption within the government. Protests were held simultaneously in Misurata as well, also calling for better living conditions and for the corrupt to face justice.

24 August

On 24 August, a comprehensive and instant investigation into the unlawful use of force by pro-GNA security forces during Sunday’s protests in Tripoli was demanded by the United Nations Support Mission in Libya (UNSMIL).

26 August

On 26 August, according to a report by the organization of Amnesty International, testimonies and video evidence suggested that during the 23 August protest in Tripoli, at least six protesters were abducted. The protesters were taken away after live ammunition was fired in an attempt to break up the crowd by armed men believed to be linked with Libya's U.N.-supported government. The organization also revealed that the shooting occurred in an area that is controlled by the Nawasi militia, in which several other protesters were injured.

However, Amnesty International, including the UN mission in Libya have called for the immediate release of the abductees and demanded for a thorough investigation. The Interior minister Fathi Bashagha, has also assured to ensure the safety of civilians by protecting them from such militia groups, even if it means applying the use of force.

=== September ===
13 September

On 13 September, protesters, some armed with guns, set fire to a government building in Benghazi, as protests over deteriorating living conditions and corruption continued in eastern Libya for a third straight day. Later on, the fire was said to have been managed, although the protesters had already left the face of the building charred in black. The protests had also reached al-Bayda, Sabha in the south, including al-Marj for the first time, which is believed to be a stronghold of Khalifa Haftar, according to Al Jazeera.

14 September

On 14 September, the Tobruk-based House of Representatives resigned amid violent protests in eastern Libya over deteriorating living conditions and corruption. A spokesman for LNA, Ahmed al-Mismari, said the administration supports peaceful protests but would not allow "terrorists and the Muslim Brotherhood" to hijack them. Prime Minister Abdallah al-Thani’s resignation was handed over to Speaker Aguila Saleh late on Sunday, according to a spokesman for the Tobruk-based House of Representatives. The government’s resignation is subject to review by the lawmakers during their next meeting, Daily Sabah added. Although, the date for the session is yet to be set.

16 September

On 16 September, Fayez al-Sarraj, head and prime minister of the Government of National Accord announced that he will be resigning from his position by the end of October 2020. This has come after one month of protests in Tripoli.

29 September

On 29 September 2020, the Wall Street Journal published details of a confidential United Nations report, accusing the United Arab Emirates of expanding military support supplies in 2020 for the Libyan National Army, led by Khalifa Haftar. A diplomat having access to an unpublished report claimed that between the months of January and February 2020, the air force unit of UAE sent off about 150 flights carrying defense systems and ammunition, as per UN experts. The flights sent to Libya by the UAE were in breach of the UN-led arms embargo, in addition to which, the Gulf nation sent about a dozen more flights using American-made C-17 military transport plane even after Haftar continued his offensive in Libya. Reportedly, the flow of military supplies from the United Arab Emirates increased between the late 2019 and early 2020 while the offensives led by Haftar-led LNA intensified against the UN-recognized GNA.

=== October ===
23 October

On 23 October, the UN disclosed that a permanent ceasefire deal had been reached between the two rival forces in Libya. The nationwide ceasefire agreement is set to ensure that all foreign forces, alongside mercenaries, have left the country for at least three months. All military forces and armed groups at the trenches are expected to retreat back to their camps, the UN’s envoy to Libya, Stephanie Williams added. The eastern city of Benghazi witnessed the landing of the first commercial passenger flight from Tripoli on Friday, which has not happened for over a year and is perceived to be an indication of success of the deal.

27 October

On 27 October, 12 bodies were reportedly discovered from four unmarked graves in the city of Tarhouna, by Libyan authorities. Since the recapture of the city in June by the Government of National Accord (GNA) from the Kaniyat militia group linked with Haftar’s Libyan National Army (LNA), several bodies had been uncovered in the area. The number of bodies have now aggregated to 98, according to a committee official.

30 October

On 30 October, Fayez al-Serraj reversed his decision to step down as Libyan Prime Minister, pending the conclusion of the current negotiation between the two sides in the country. Initially, the Libyan PM had decided to resign by the end of October, with his replacement which would have been decided through peace talks in Morocco. His decision to stay followed calls made by the High Council of State for Sarraj to maintain his position, being the head of the Presidential Council, until a new presidential council is chosen. Also, the Tripoli parliament and UN Support Mission in Libya urged al-Sarraj to withdraw from stepping down, considering the stakes.

=== November ===
5 November

On 5 November, in addition to the four unmarked graves which were found last week Tuesday in the southern Libyan city of Tarhouna, officials announced that 2 more mass graves had also been newly discovered. 14 unidentified bodies were reportedly found by the Libyan authorities in the newly discovered mass graves.

The Libyan Army said it spotted and confirmed Russian mercenaries from the Wagner Group inside an elementary school in Sirte. Meanwhile, the Libyan National Army destroyed a conference complex in the same city.

=== December ===
==== 25 December ====
On 25 December, Libya’s rival leaders commenced a United Nations-brokered prisoner exchange as part of a preliminary cease-fire agreement between the warring Libyan groups. The exchange of a first batch of prisoners, supervised by a joint military committee, took place Friday in the southwestern village of al-Shwayrif, according to the United Nations Support Mission in Libya (UNSMIL).

==== 27 December ====
On 27 December, for the first time since 2014, a delegation of senior Egyptian security officials arrived in Libya’s capital Tripoli, to hold talks with the UN-recognized Government of National Accord (GNA). The Egyptian delegation was led by the deputy chief of the General Intelligence Service, Ayman Badea, who met with the Interior Minister of the internationally recognized government, Fathi Bashagha, including the head of intelligence in western Libya, Emad Trapolsi. They also met with the Foreign Minister of the GNA, Mohamed Taher Siala and assured to reopen the Egyptian embassy in Tripoli as soon as possible, which has been shut down since 2014, Reuters added.

== 2021 ==
=== January ===
16 January

The United Nations (U.N.) disclosed that a major progress had been obtained in the talks regarding the formation of a transitional government in Libya. The possible solution for creating a transitional government was presented by the advisory committee, which is part of a 75-member forum representing the major regions of Libya. Run-up to Libya’s upcoming December elections are expected to be supervised by the transitional government which will be created, the UN added.

=== February ===
1 February

The Libyan representatives led by the UN reportedly met in Geneva on Monday, in order to appoint a temporary executive which will oversee the elections in Libya that have been scheduled to take place towards the end of 2021.

19 February

A detailed report by the US media suggested that Erik Prince, a private security contractor, who is also known to be an ally of former US President Donald Trump, violated a UN arms embargo on Libya. In the report also, Prince was accused of providing weapons and foreign mercenaries to the LNA’s Khalifa Haftar.

21 February

Libya's powerful interior minister in the UN-backed Government of National Accord (GNA), Fathi Bashagha reportedly survived an assassination attempt near Libya’s capital Tripoli. Fire was said to have been opened on Bashagha’s motorcade by unknown gunmen, as he was returning from a meeting he had with the chairman of the national oil corporation. Although the minister was not hurt during the attack, one of his guards was injured, according to the VOA News. However, two of the attackers were apprehended by Bashagha's security detail, who fired back at the attackers. Also, a third attacker Radwan al-Hangari, was reported to have died later in the hospital.

=== March ===
2 March

Niger seized 17 tonnes of cannabis resin from a warehouses in Niamey, originating from Lebanon, then passed through the port of Lomé, Togo and bound for Libya.

3 March

The bodies of four Filipinos, an Austrian, and a Czech, all oil workers who were kidnapped from Ghani oilfield and then murdered in Libya in 2015 by Islamic State terrorists, were found at a cemetery in Derna.

10 March

The Libyan parliament in an effort to put an end to years of violence in Libya approved the formation of an interim unity government. 121 out of a total of 132 lawmakers who were present, voted in support of the cabinet of interim Prime Minister Abdul Hamid Dbeibah, which is supposed to oversee the upcoming elections in December. 32 members were said to have been absent during the vote. The GNA and the eastern administration were both glad about the outcome of the parliament session which was held in Sirte, Reuters added. Also, Pakistan’s Foreign Ministry released a statement, applauding the new unity government created by Prime Minister Abdul Hamid Dbeibeh.

13 March

Libyan Prime Minister Abdul Hamid Dbeibah organized the first meeting with the cabinet office in the country’s capital Tripoli.

14 March

Despite Libya’s latest success in creating a new government, four airstrikes were reported to have hit Libya’s southern city of Ubari. According to a local official who requested to be unknown, the airstrikes targeted different points near the city center. Based on similar attacks in the past which have been launched in the city, it might be possible that the United States Africa Command (AFRICOM) was responsible for the latest airstrikes, the source added. There have not been any immediate comments from either the Libyan authorities or the US, regarding the airstrikes.

On Sunday also, prior to the airstrikes in Ubari, forces loyal to the Libyan eastern commander Khalifa Haftar revealed that they had apprehended at least five men. The operation was carried out in an attempt to capture a high-profile ISIS leader in Libya, Mohamed Miloud Mohamed known as Abu Omar, according to the Libyan National Army. Subsequently, the operation led to the successful apprehension of Abu Omar, Haftar’s spokesman Ahmad Al-Mesmari added.

17 March

The Tunisian head of state Kais Saied reportedly visited Libya’s capital Tripoli, in order to hold talks with the country’s new unity government. Kais, alongside Libyan Prime Minister Abdul Hamid Dbeibah and head of Libya’s Presidential Council Mohammad Younes Menfi, during their meeting, discussed reviving the diplomatic relations between Tunisia and Libya.

23 March

France in an attempt to pledge its support for Libya’s new unity government has maintained that it would be reopening its embassy next Monday, President Emmanuel Macron revealed. The announcement was made, following Macron’s meeting in Paris with the president of Libya’s Presidential Council Mohammad Younes Menfi and the vice-president Musa al-Koni. Macron also emphasized how important it is to make sure that the ceasefire deal is preserved, thereby uniting the Libyan armed forces, so as to enable the successful conduct of elections in December.

24 March

A senior Libyan commander loyal to Haftar, Mahmoud al-Werfalli was reportedly killed by unknown gunmen in Libya’s city of Benghazi. Al-Werfalli, who is also wanted by the ICC for alleged war crimes, was killed in his car alongside his cousin Ayman, when unknown gunmen opened fire on his vehicle. Also, the ICC was said to have indicted al-Wefalli twice for the alleged killing of at least 40 captives, including the execution of blindfolded prisoners, as he was shown in pictures in 2018. However, there was no immediate claim of responsibility for al-Werfalli’s assassination by any group, according to the ABC News.

27 March

Two suspects linked to the killing of Libyan commander Mahmoud al-Werfalli were apprehended by the Libyan authorities. The identity of the two suspects was revealed by the head of Benghazi’s military prosecution connected to Haftar, as Hanine al-Abdaly and Mohamad Abdeljalil. Prior to the arrests, orders had been issued by Haftar that all shops were to set up surveillance cameras before Tuesday, according to Gen. Abdelbasit Bougheress, the head of security in Benghazi.

=== April ===
25 April

Armed Haftar supporters, including civilians, reportedly prevented a delegation of Prime Minister Abdul Hamid Dbeibeh from entering the city of Benghazi, upon their arrival at the Benina Airport. Subsequently, it was announced that the Libyan cabinet meeting had been postponed, just a few hours after the government security team visiting Benghazi had been forced by armed men to return to Tripoli.

27 April

The deputy Prime Minister of Libya, Ibrahim Abu Jinnah, criticized Haftar supporters for preventing the cabinet meeting from holding in Benghazi.

=== May ===
7 May

The Presidential Council's headquarters at Corinthia Hotel in Tripoli reportedly came under attack by an armed militia group late on Friday. Armed men, wearing uniforms were seen outside the entrance of the hotel, according to unverified photos which were posted on social media. No one was hurt during the raid, as there were no workers present during the weekly day of rest, the presidential council spokeswoman Najwa Wheba disclosed.

18 May

Tunisia's flag carrier Tunisair announced it had resumed services to Libya in light of the UN-sponsored peace agreement, becoming the first foreign airline to connect to the country since the outbreak of the Second Libyan Civil War seven years ago. A day earlier, it flew its first flights to Benghazi and Tripoli, and had scheduled five flights to both cities for each week.

23 May

Qatar’s foreign minister Mohammed Bin Abdulrahman Al Thani reportedly met with Libya’s foreign minister Najla Al-Manqoush, alongside other officials in Tripoli, following Libya’s invitation to Qatar to reopen its embassy in the Libyan capital. During Al Thani’s one-day visit reaffirmed Qatar’s support for the UN-led unity government, so far as it prevents Libya from international interference.

=== June ===
6 June

A suicide bombing in Libya’s southern city of Sebha, left at least two people dead. Apart from the two security officers who were killed during the blast, at least four others were also injured. Later in the evening, the Islamic State (IS) claimed that one of its fighters detonated the bomb at the checkpoint, according to the US News. The group revealed the identity of the suicide bomber as Muhammed El Muhajer. However, the official spokesman for the Haftar forces, Major General Ahmed Al-Mismari, claimed that the Muslim Brotherhood was behind the attack based on their investigations

20 June

Libya’s unity government announced the reopening of the main coastal road linking the east and west, as part of the 2020 peace deal. Prime Minister Abdulhamid Dbeibah was accompanied by members of his cabinet in Libya’s Buwairat al-Hassoun town, for the reopening ceremony of the highway.

=== September ===
6 September

The Libyan Presidential council described the release of political prisoners as part of the national reconciliation project. A number of political prisoners whose jail terms had ended or hadn't been charged were said to have been released, as part of the reconciliation efforts. Najwa Wahiba, spokeswoman of the Libyan Presidential Council maintained that the release of the prisoners was in line with judicial orders and that the Council would continue to coordinate with the judiciary to see to the release of other prisoners as well.

Separately, a day earlier Muammar Gaddafi's son Al-Saadi was also reportedly released based on a ruling by the Attorney General. According to Al Jazeera, immediately after Al-Saadi’s release, he departed on a plane to Istanbul, Turkey. Some residents of Tripoli applauded the Libyan judiciary for upholding justice to oversee the release of Saadi.

== Peace efforts ==
During the first half of 2015, the United Nations facilitated a series of different negotiating tracks seeking to bring together the rival governments of Libya and warring militias tearing Libya apart. The U.N. representative to Libya reconvened delegations from Libya's rival governments on 8 June 2015 to present the latest draft proposal for a unity government for the war-torn country. After a warning one week earlier that the country had been running out of money and had risked ceasing to be a functional state, Bernardino Leon urged the Libyans to approve the fourth version of the draft proposal in a ceremony in Morocco. On 8 October 2015, Bernardino Leon held a press conference in which the names of several potential members of a unified government were announced.

A meeting between the rival governments was held at Auberge de Castille in Valletta, Malta on 16 December 2015. The meeting was delayed for a few days after the representatives from the Tobruk government initially failed to show up. The leader of the Tripoli government, Nouri Abusahmain, announced that they "will not accept foreign intervention against the will of the Libyan people," while the leader of the Tobruk government Aguila Saleh Issa called on the international community to "allow [them] time to form an effective unity government." Representatives from both governments also met officials from the United Nations, Italy, the United States and Russia in a conference in Rome.

On 17 December 2015, delegates from both rival governments signed a peace deal backed by the UN in Skhirat, Morocco, although there was opposition to this within both factions. The Government of National Accord was formed as a result of this agreement, and its first meeting took place in Tunis on 2 January 2016.

On 17 December 2017, general Khalifa Haftar declared the "so-called" Shkirat agreement void.

A major step in the post-Salamé phase of negotiations started on 21 August 2020 with al-Sarraj for the GNA and Aguila Saleh for the LNA jointly announcing a ceasefire and calling for the lifting of the oil blockade, for a new presidential council to be established temporarily in Sirte, for parliamentary and presidential elections to be held in March 2021, and for joint deployment of security forces in Sirte to guard a new presidential council.
