= Benghazi al-Jadida =

Benghazi al-Jadida بنغازي الجديدة New Benghazi
- Basic People's Congress division
- Interactive map of Benghazi al-Jadida
- Coordinates: 32°06′10″N 20°07′11″E
- Country: Libya
- District: Benghazi District
- Time zone: UTC+2 (EET)

Benghazi al-Jadida or New benghazi is a Basic People's Congress administrative division of Benghazi, Libya. It is part of the city of Benghazi located east of the port and west of Al-Hawari.
