= Al-Salmani =

Al-Salmani السلماني
- Basic People's Congress division
- Interactive map of Al-Salmani
- Coordinates: 32°06′41″N 20°05′28″E
- Country: Libya
- District: Benghazi District
- Time zone: UTC+2 (EET)

Al-Salmani is a Basic People's Congress administrative division of Benghazi, Libya. It is part of the city of Benghazi, being east of the port and just north of Raas Abayda.
