= Sidi Khalifa =

Sidi Khalifa or Sidi Khelifa may refer to the following places in the Maghreb (Northern Africa) :

- Sidi Khalifa, Libya
- Sidi Khelifa (Tunisia)
