= Shuhadaa al-Salawi =

- Basic People's Congress division
- Country: Libya
- District: Benghazi District
- Time zone: UTC+2 (EET)

Shuhadaa al-Salawi was a Basic People's Congress administrative division of Benghazi, Libya.
