= Al-Nawagiya =

- Basic People's Congress division
- Location in Libya
- Coordinates: 31°55′41″N 20°10′06″E
- Country: Libya
- District: Benghazi District
- Time zone: UTC+2 (EET)

Al-Nawagiya is a Basic People's Congress administrative division of Benghazi, Libya.
