= Wasita =

Wasita الوسيطة
- Basic People's Congress division
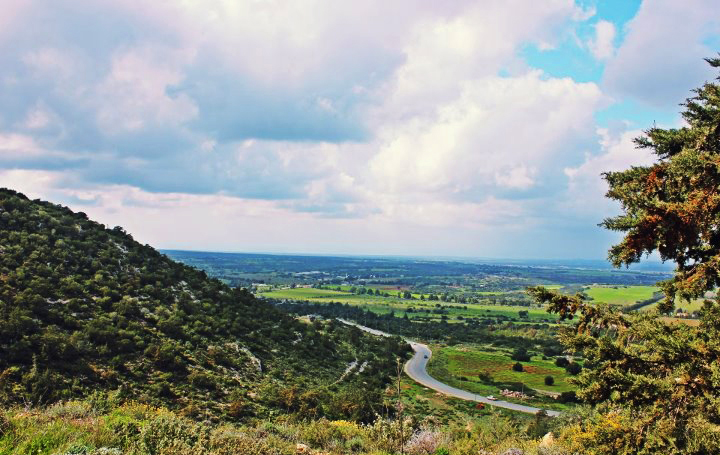

- Location in Libya
- Coordinates: 32°47′50.14″N 21°41′30.19″E
- Country: Libya
- Region: Cyrenaica
- District: Jabal al Akhdar
- Time zone: UTC+2 (EET)

Wasita (al-Wasīṭâ) (Arabic: الوسيطة) is a Basic People's Congress administrative division of Bayda, Libya. Wasita is located about 5 km north of Bayda. The proportion of low-density population in Wasita, because it is considered an agricultural area and the lush trees and natural reserves.

== See also ==
- List of cities in Libya
