= Al-Berka =

Coordinates: 32.0983°N 20.0817°E

- Basic People's Congress division
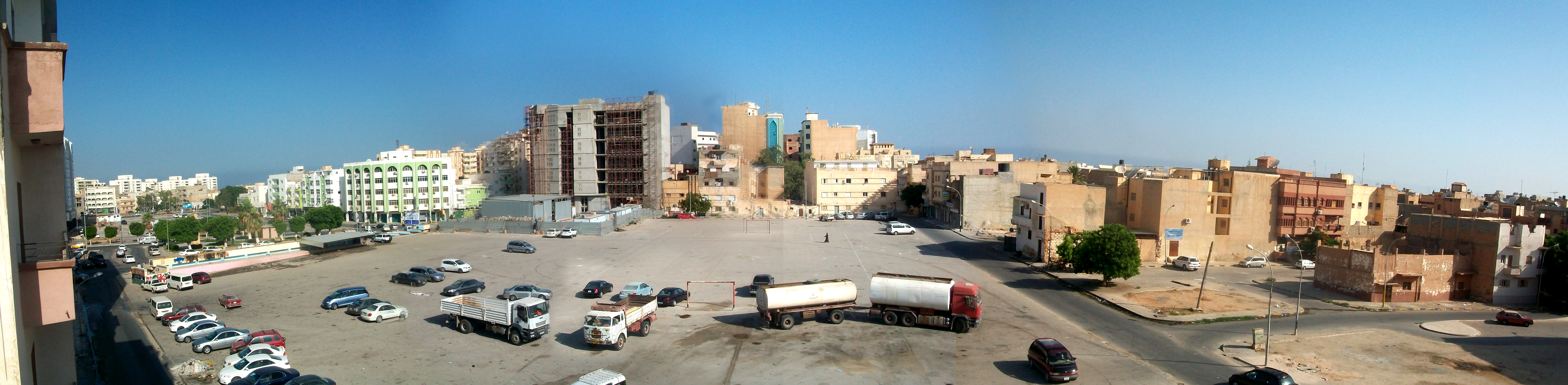
- Panorama of Berka
- Interactive map of Al-Berka
- Country: Libya
- District: Benghazi District
- Time zone: UTC+2 (EET)

Al-Berka (Arabic:البركة) is a Basic People's Congress administrative division of Benghazi, Libya. As of the 2011 Libyan revolution, the area is simply known as a district of Benghazi after the Gaddafi era Basic People's Congresses were disbanded.

== History ==
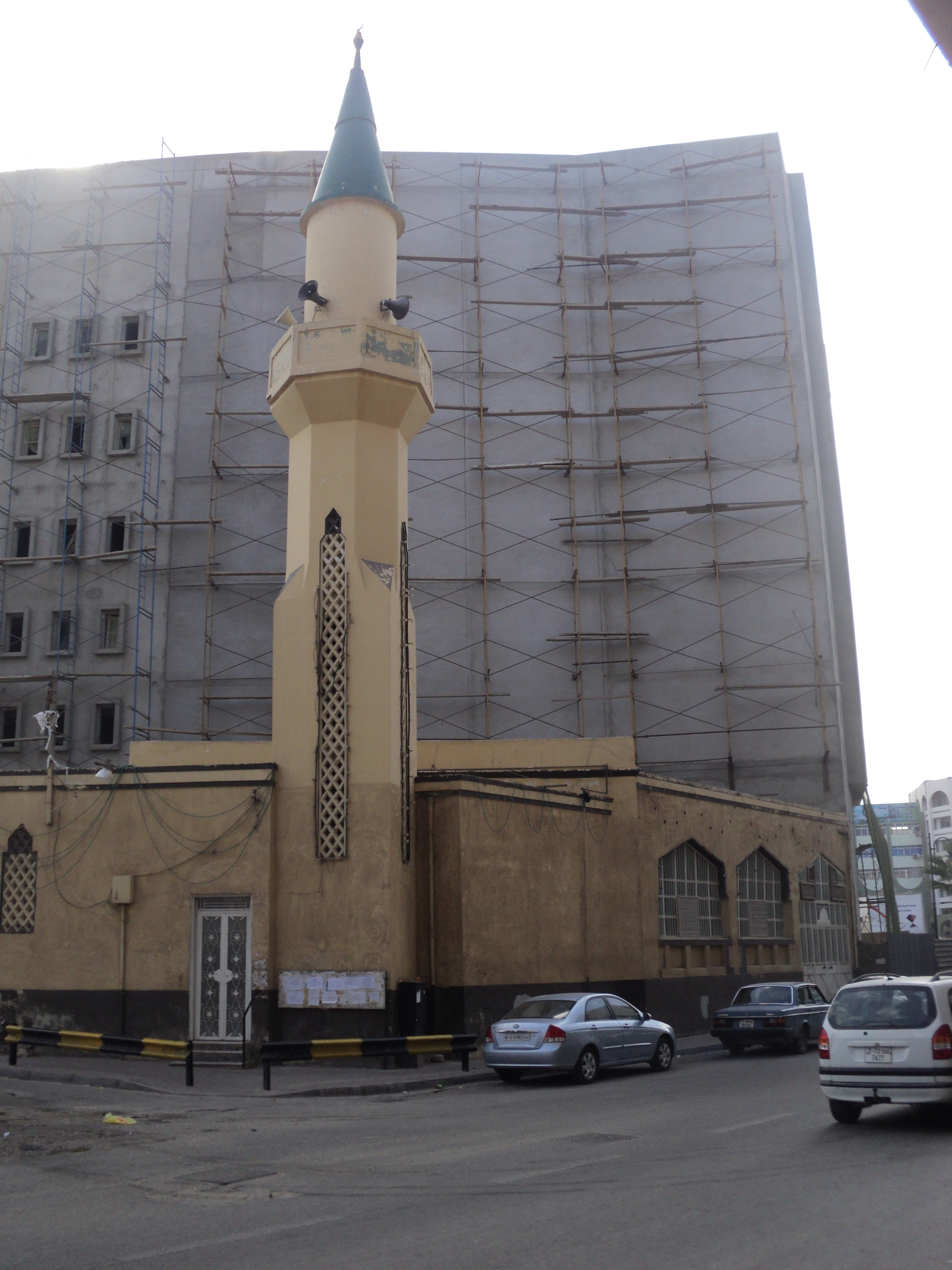
Hadiya Mosque in El-Berka is one of the oldest mosques in Benghazi and was built during the Ottoman Era.

Al-Berka is one of the oldest districts in Benghazi and has buildings which attest to both its Ottoman and Italian era routes. One such example is the Hadiya mosque built in the early 20th century.
