= Al-Kwayfiya =

Coordinates: 32.2019°N 20.1714°E

- Basic People's Congress division
- Interactive map of Al-Kwayfiya
- Country: Libya
- District: Benghazi District
- Time zone: UTC+2 (EET)

Al-Kwayfiya is a Basic People's Congress administrative division of Benghazi, Libya.
