= Wardama =

Wardama وردامة
- Village
- Location in Libya
- Coordinates: 32°47′30.50″N 21°47′39.31″E
- Country: Libya
- Region: Cyrenaica
- District: Jabal al Akhdar
- Elevation: 2,224 ft (678 m)
- Time zone: UTC+2

Wardama (Arabic: وردامة) is a Basic People's Congress administrative division of Bayda, Libya. Wardama is located about 5 km northwest of the city of Bayda.

== See also ==
- List of cities in Libya
