= Hay al-Mukhtar =

- Basic People's Congress division
- Country: Libya
- District: Benghazi District
- Time zone: UTC+2 (EET)

Hay al-Mukhtar is a Basic People's Congress administrative division of Benghazi, Libya.
