= Al-Fuwayhat =

Coordinates: 32°05′N 20°07′E

- Basic People's Congress division
- Interactive map of Al-Fuwayhat
- Country: Libya
- District: Benghazi District
- Time zone: UTC+2 (EET)

Al-Fuwayhat is one of the affluent residential districts of Benghazi, Libya.

== Landmarks ==
- Libyan International Medical University
