= Sidi Khalifa, Libya =

Sidi Khalifa
- Basic People's Congress division
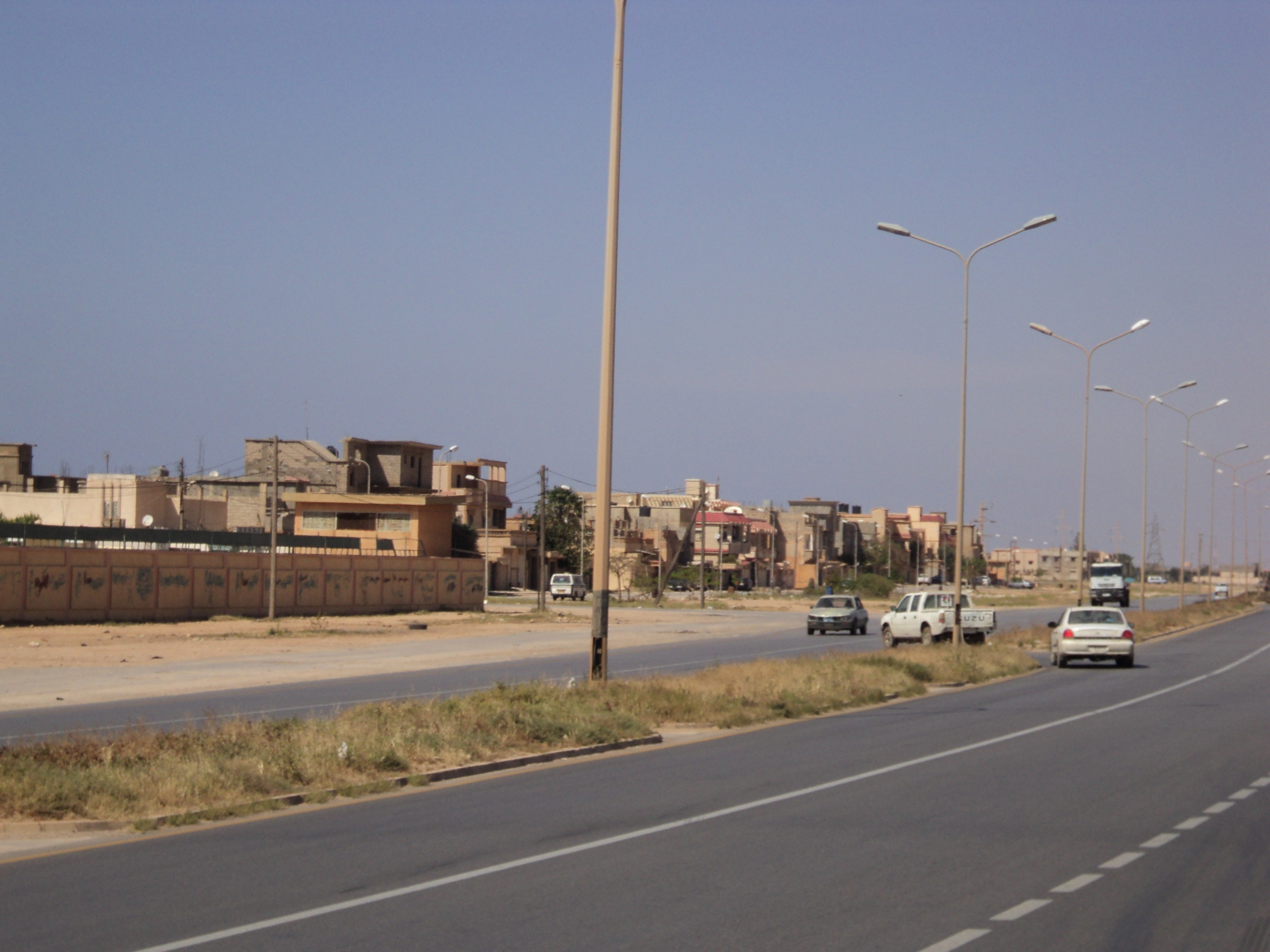
- Country: Libya
- District: Benghazi District
- Time zone: UTC+2 (EET)

Sidi Khalifa is a Basic People's Congress administrative division of Benghazi, Libya.

== See also ==
- List of cities in Libya
