= Al-Quwarsha =

- Basic People's Congress division
- Interactive map of Al-Quwarsha
- Coordinates: 32°1′59.02″N 20°4′0.01″E
- Country: Libya
- District: Benghazi District
- Time zone: UTC+2 (EET)

Al-Quwarsha is a Basic People's Congress administrative division of Benghazi, Libya.
