= Bu-Fakhra =

- Basic People's Congress division
- Country: Libya
- Region: Cyrenaica
- District: Benghazi
- Time zone: UTC+2 (EET)

Bu-Fakhra is a Basic People's Congress administrative division of Benghazi, Libya. The area is named after a venerated saint in the area, whose tomb was once a popular visited site. As of 2012, the tomb was demolished by Salafists in the relative absence of law and order after the Libyan 2011 revolution.
