= Qar Yunis =

Qar Yunis قاريونس Garyounis
- Neighbourhood
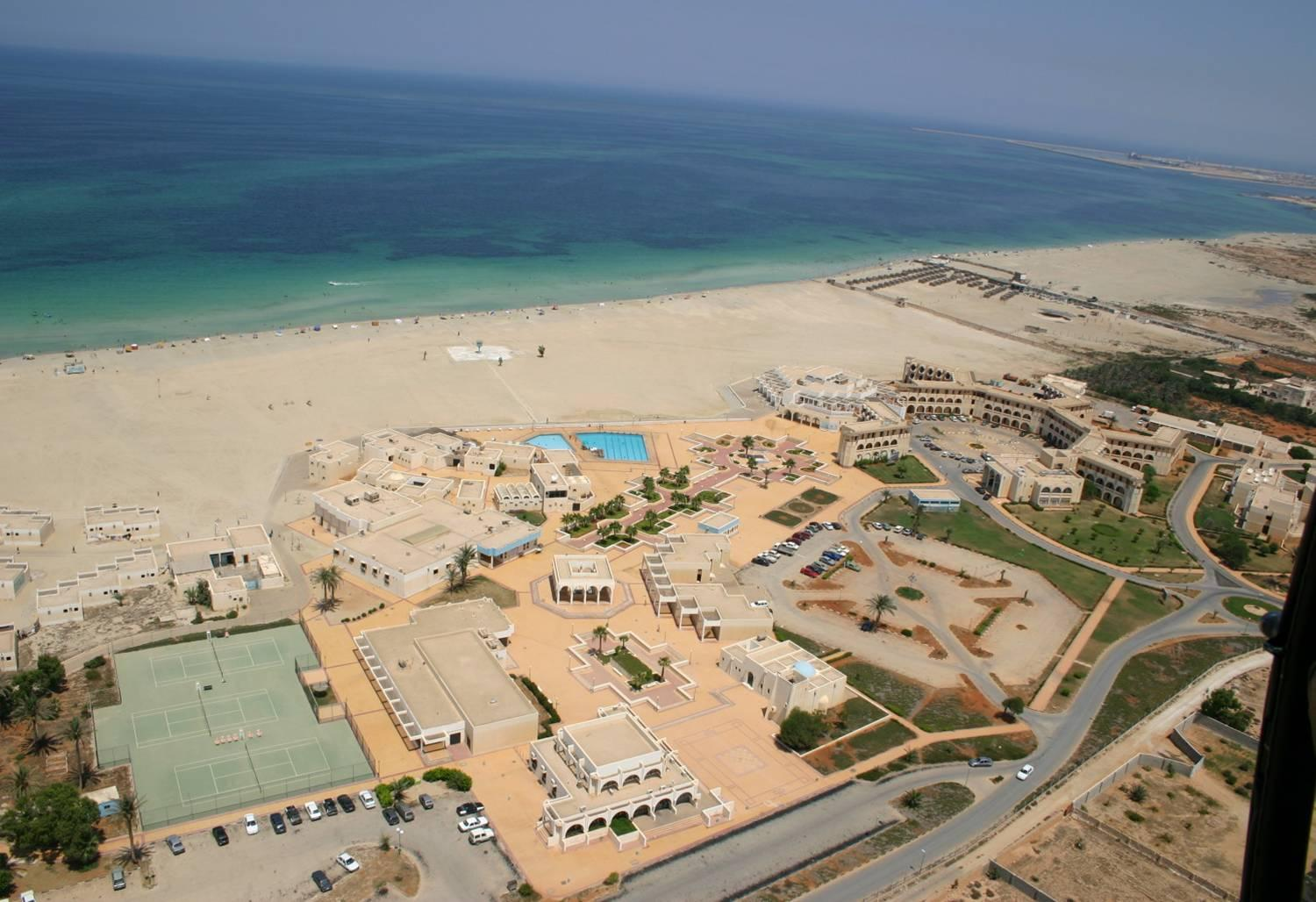
- Nickname: The Green Gate
- Location in Libya
- Coordinates: 32°01′38.64″N 20°02′28.53″E
- Country: Libya
- District: Benghazi District
- Municipality: Benghazi Municipality
- Region: Cyrenaica
- Founded: 1913

Area
  - Total: 7.1 sq mi (18.5 km^{2})
  - Land: 7.1 sq mi (18.5 km^{2})
- Elevation: 115 ft (35 m)
- Time zone: UTC+2 (EET)
- Postal Code: 92001
- Area code: +218 61
- License Plate Code: BEN

Qar Younis (Arabic: قاريونس, also spelled Qaryounis or Garyounis) is a southern neighbourhood of Benghazi, Libya. It lies to the west of the neighborhood of Al Qawarishah. It has a population of approximately 15,000 people.

== History ==
In June 2016, the Media Office of the Libyan Armed Forces General Command announced that "90% of the Garyounis apartment complexes" were under military control.

== Landmarks ==
The suburb houses the main campus of the University of Benghazi, formerly known as Garyounis University. The University of Benghazi is the first modern university in Libya, established in 1955 as the University of Libya. The neighbourhood also contains Qar Younis Conference Hall, Malik ibn Aws Mosque, Al-Fadil Resort and the Menart Benghazi Hotel.
