= Basic People's Congress (administrative division) =

Smallest administrative division of the Socialist People's Libyan Arab Jamahiriya

Basic People's Congress (Arabic: مؤتمر شعبي أساسي, romanized: Mu'tamar shaʿbi asāsi) was the primary administrative division in Libya under the Great Socialist People's Libyan Arab Jamahiriya from 1977 to 2011. It corresponded approximately to the level of a township or borough.

During Muammar Gaddafi's rule, political caucuses and committees of the Basic People's Congress operated at this level. Representatives from the Basic People's Congresses regulated operations at the higher shabiyah (district) level.

In July 2013 the shabiyat and Basic People's Congress system was replaced with a new baladiyat system of ninety-nine first-level administrative divisions.
