= List of armed groups in the Libyan civil war (2014–2020) =

A number of armed groups had involved themselves in the Libyan Civil War.

== Second Libyan Civil War (2014–2020) ==
House of Representatives, Gaddafi loyalists and allies	Presidential Council and allies	General National Congress and allies	Islamic State of Iraq and the Levant Al-Qaeda, other Salafist jihadists, and allies
Libyan Interim Government (Tobruk-based): Libyan National Army; Libyan Ground Forces; Benghazi Security Directorate; Tajoura Battalion; Libyan Air Force (parts); Tripoli Brigade; Al-Saiqa; JEM (from 2016); Gaddafi loyalists: Brigade 93; Green Resistance; Warshefana militias; Popular Front for the Liberation of Libya; Allied armed groups: Zintan Brigades; Lightning Bolt Brigade; Qaaqaa Brigade; Civic Brigade; Toubou militias (until 2019); Mercenaries (allegedly); National Forces Alliance; Wagner Group; DShRG Rusich; Imperial Legion; Egypt (from February 2015): Egyptian Army; Egyptian Air Force; United Arab Emirates (limited involvement): Union Defence Force; Sudan (RSF); Supported by: France; Special Operations Command; DGSE; Russia; Spetsnaz GRU; Saudi Arabia; Chad; Belarus; Syria; United States (until 2016); Algeria (until 2018); United Kingdom (until 2016); Jordan (until 2016); Greece; Israel (allegedly, denied by LNA)	Government of National Accord (since 2016): Presidential Guard; Misrata Brigades; Petroleum Facilities Guard; Libyan Navy; Abu Sleem Central Security Force; Allied armed groups: Tuareg militias; Toubou militias (since 2019); Fajr Libya militia; Misrata Military Council; Ministry of Interior; Al-Bunyan al-Marsous; Federal Cyrenaica; Mercenaries (allegedly); Sabratha Military Council/Sabratha Revolutionary Brigades; (Syrian opposition) Syrian National Army (since Dec. 2019): Sultan Murad Division; Mu'tasim Division; Suleyman Shah Division; Sham Legion; Ahrar al-Sharqiya; Suqour al-Sham Brigades; Northern Falcons Brigade; Samarkand Brigade; Turkey (since Jan. 2020): Turkish Armed Forces; Turkish Land Forces; Turkish Navy; Turkish Air Force; Special Forces Command; National Intelligence Organization; United States (since 1 Aug. 2016): U.S. Air Force; U.S. Marine Corps; Supported by: United Kingdom; United States; Italy; Italian Marines; Elements of the San Marco Marine Brigade; France (until 2019); United Nations; European Union; Qatar; Turkey; Sudan (until 2019); Algeria; Pakistan; Iran; Morocco; Malta; Ukraine	National Salvation Government (Tripoli-based): Libya Shield Force; Western Shield; Central Shield; LROR; Libyan Air Force (parts); Presidential Guard; National Guard; Allied armed groups: Fajr Libya militia; Muslim Brotherhood; Justice and Construction Party; Awakening (unclear); Brigade al-Marsah; Brigade Sherikhan; Union for Homeland; Misrata Brigades; Tripoli Revolutionary Brigade; Democratic Party; Mercenaries (allegedly); Amazigh militias; Supported by: Sudan (2014–16); Qatar (2014–16); Turkey (2014–16); Ukraine; Iran; High Council of Revolution (from December 2016)	Islamic State of Iraq and the Levant (from 2014): Military of ISIL; Wilayat Barqa; Wilayat Tripolitania; Wilayat Fezzan; Shura Council of Benghazi Revolutionaries: Ansar al-Sharia (2014–17); Libya Shield 1 (2014–17); February 17th Martyrs Brigade (2014–17); Rafallah al-Sahati Brigade (2014–17); Jaysh al-Mujahidin; Brega Martyrs Brigade; Shura Council of Mujahideen in Derna (2014–19): Ansar al-Sharia (Derna) (2014–19); Abu Salim Martyrs (2014–15); Benghazi Defense Brigades; Ajdabiya Revolutionaries Shura Council (2015–16) Allied armed groups: Misrata Brigades; (Libya) LROR; Ansar al-Sharia (Tunisia); Al-Qaeda; Al-Qaeda in the Islamic Maghreb (2014–15; alleged since)

Military situation in the Libyan Civil War as of 10 December 2016. Under the control of the Tobruk-led Government and Libyan National Army Under the control of the Government of National Accord and Allies Under the control of the National Salvation Government Controlled by the Mujahedeen Councils of Derna, Benghazi and Adjabiya Controlled by local forces Controlled by Tuareg forces

=== Notes ===
The Tripoli brigade and Tajoura battalion are in fact currently fighting against haftar in Tripoli (April 2019)

- The Shura Council of Benghazi Revolutionaries are fighting on the part of the GNA at the Gulf of Sidra Offensive (2017).
- Parts of the Gaddafi loyalists are allied with the Libyan National Army.
- The Libya Shield 1 is a part of the Libya Shield Force.

== See also ==
- List of armed groups in the Syrian Civil War
- List of armed groups in the War in Iraq (2013–2017)
- List of armed groups in the Yemeni Civil War
- List of armed groups in the Syrian Civil War spillover in Lebanon
- Combatants of the Iraq War
