= List of wars involving Libya =

This is a list of wars involving the State of Libya and its predecessor states.

== Ottoman Tripolitania (1551-1911) ==
Conflict	Combatant 1	Combatant 2	Results
Mari Stephano De expidition againt Tripoli (1559-1560)	Ottoman Tripolitania	Republic of Genoa	Tripolitanian Victory • Failure to Capture Tripoli
Action Of 1561	Ottoman Tripolitania	Spanish Empire	Tripolitanian victory • Spanish galleys rooted
Cretan War (1645-1669)	Ottoman Empire; Ottoman Tripolitania; Ottoman Tunis; Regency of Algiers	Republic of Venice; Knights of Malta; Papal States; France; Greek revolutionaries; Maniots	Ottoman Victory: Crete conquered by the Ottoman Empire; Venetian gains in Dalmatia
Narbrough Campaign on Tripoli (1675)	Ottoman Tripolitania	British Empire	Tripolitanian Victory • Failure of the Campaign and a Peace Treaty
Morean War (1684-1699)	Ottoman Empire; Ottoman Tripolitania (Beylik of Tunis) Ottoman Tunisia; Regency of Algiers	Republic of Venice Habsburg Monarchy	Defeat •Morea Ceded to venice
French-Tripolitania War (1681-1685)	Tripolitania; Tunis	France	French victory
Bombardment of Tripoli (1686)	Ottoman Tripolitania	Spanish Empire	Inconclusive • Failed to capture Tripoli • Peace Treaty
Tripoli Naval Skirmish (1689)	Ottoman Tripolitania	Holy Roman Empire; Tsardom of Russia; Republic of Venice; Knights of Malta; Papal States	Victory
Maghrebi war (1699–1702)	(Ottoman Tripolitania) Beylik of Tunis; Sultanate of Morocco; Regency of Tripoli	Regency of Algiers	Algerian victory: Moroccan and Tunisian forces routed; Very minor, or no changes
Siege of Tripoli (1705)	Ottoman Tripolitania	Ottoman Tunisia	Tripolitanian victory
Ottoman–Venetian War (1714–1718)	Ottoman Empire; Ottoman Tripolitania; Regency of Algiers; Beylik of Tunis	Republic of Venice; Habsburg Monarchy (Note: from 1716); Kingdom of Portugal (Note: 1716–1717); Order of Malta; Papal States; Spain; Himariotes; Hajduk	Victory • Morea Ceded to the Ottoman Empire
Bombardment of Tripoli (1728)	Ottoman Tripolitania	Kingdom of France	Inconclusive • Tripolitanian Remained Undefeated
Venetian Siege of Tripoli (1766)	Ottoman Tripolitania	Republic of Venice	Victory • Venetian Galleys rooted, and expedition Failed
Tripolitanian civil war (1790–1795)	1790–1793 Yusuf Karamanli 1793–1795 Ottoman Tripolitania	1790–1793 Ali ibn Mehmed; Hamet Karamanli 1793–1795 Karamanli Tripolitania; Beylik of Tunis 1794–1795	Karamanli victory
Action of 16 May 1797	Tripolitania	Denmark–Norway	Victory
Barbary Wars (1801–1815)	Algiers; Tripolitania; Morocco(1802–1804)	United States; Sweden (1800–1802); Sicily (1801–1805)	Inconclusive
First Barbary War (1801–1805)	Ottoman Tripolitania; Morocco (1802)	United States; Sweden; Sicily	Peace treaty: The United States paying ransom; Tripolitania ships allowed to inspect American ships; Freeing prisoners of American ships
Battle of Tripoli (1825)	Tripolitania	Sardinia	Sardinian victory: Sardinia Destroyed two tripolitanian ships; Tripolitanian soldiers routed; Peace treaty concluded
Bombardment of Tripoli (1828)	Ottoman Tripolitania	Kingdom of the Two Sicilies	Tripolitanian victory
Italo-Turkish War (1911-1912)	Ottoman Empire; Senussi Order	Italy	Italian victory: Italy gains Tripolitania, Cyrenaica and the Dodecanese Islands
Italian invasion of Libya (1911)	Ottoman Empire; Senussi Order	Kingdom of Italy	Italian victory: Italian annexation of Libya

== Colonial period (1911-1951) ==
Conflict	Combatant 1	Combatant 2	Results
First Italo-Senussi War (1911–1917)	Senussi	Italy United Kingdom	Defeat: Libyan resistance put down
Second Italo-Senussi War (1923–1932)	Senussi Order Tripolitanian rebels Fezzan rebels	Italy	Italian victory: Stabilization of Italian rule in Libya
North African Campaign (1940–1943)	Allies; British Empire: United Kingdom; India; Australia; New Zealand; Transjordan; Newfoundland; (Cyrenaica) Libyan Arab Force; United States (Note: November 1942 to May 1943.); Free France: Algeria; Tunisia; Morocco; Australia; South Africa; Poland; Greece; Czechoslovakia	Axis; Italy: Libya; Germany Vichy France (Note: 8–11 November 1942. Vichy officially pursued a policy of armed neutrality and conducted military actions against armed incursions from Axis and Allied belligerents. The pledging of allegiance of the Vichy troops in French North Africa to the Allies convinced the Axis that Vichy could not be trusted to continue this policy, so they invaded and occupied the French rump state (Case Anton)): Algeria; Tunisia; Morocco	Allied victory: Italian Libya placed under British and French military administration

== Libyan Kingdom (1951-1969) ==
Conflict	Combatant 1	Combatant 2	Results
Arab Cold War (1952-1991 (Note: Some sources variously date the end of the period to c.1979 or F1990, particularly Yemeni unification, the end of the Lebanese Civil War, the Gulf War or the end of the Western Sahara War. Some sources say ongoing.))	Saudi Arabia; Kingdom of Iraq (until 1958); Ba'athist Iraq (1979–1990); Jordan; Morocco; Kingdom of Egypt (until 1953); Arab Republic of Egypt (since 1974); Syria (before 1954, 1961–1963); Right Wing of Fatah; Libya (until 1969); Federation of the Emirates of South Arabia / Federation of South Arabia (until 1967); Protectorate of South Arabia (until 1967); Kingdom of Yemen (until 1970); North Yemen (1970–1974, since 1978); Muscat and Oman (until 1970); Imamate of Oman (until 1959); Oman (since 1970); (Sultanate of Zanzibar) Zanzibar (until 1964); Bahrain; Kuwait; Qatar; Somalia (since 1977); Chad; Senegal; Comoros; Djibouti; Sudan (before 1969, since 1985); Trucial States (until 1971); United Arab Emirates (from 1971); Muslim Brotherhood; Arab Federation (1958): Iraq; Jordan	Republic of Egypt (1953–1958); United Arab Republic (1958–1971); Arab Republic of Egypt (1971–1973); Iraqi Republic (1958–1968); Ba'athist Iraq (1968–1979, 1990−1991); Syrian Republic (1954–1958/1961); Ba'athist Syria (from 1963); Libya (after 1969); Algeria; Sudan (1969–1971); South Yemen; North Yemen (1962–1970, 1974–1978); Mauritania (until 1984); Palestine Liberation Organization; Abu Nidal Organization; Polisario Front / Sahrawi Arab Democratic Republic; Somalia (1969–1977); Arab Nationalist Movement; Ba'ath Party (until 1966); DLF(1963–1968); PFLOAG (1968–1974); NDFLOAG (1969–1971); PFLO (1974–1976); Hezbollah (from 1985); Federation of Arab Republics; Arab Islamic Republic United Arab States (1958–1961): United Arab Republic; Kingdom of Yemen	Inconclusive: Decline of pan-Arabism and Nasserism after the death of Gamal Abdel Nasser; Rise of Wahhabism, Salafi jihadism, and Islamism after the death of Nasser; International propagation of Salafism and Wahhabism in several countries financed with Saudi oil exports; Beginning of the 1969 Somali coup d'état, establishing the Somali Democratic Republic; Creation of Gulf Cooperation Council; Failed attempts of an Arab Union: Arab Federation; United Arab Republic; United Arab States; Federation of Arab Republics; United Arab Kingdom; Union of Arab Republics; Arab Islamic Republic; Successful attempts of an Arab Union: Unity of nine Arab emirates to form UAE; Yemeni unification
Battle of Essien (1957)	Libya (Algeria) FLN	France	Libyan-Algerian victory: French forces withdraw from the region

== Libyan Arab Republic (1969-1977) ==
Conflict	Combatant 1	Combatant 2	Results
1969 Libyan revolution	Free Officers Movement	Kingdom of Libya; Cyrenaican Defence Force (CYDEF)	Free Officers victory: Overthrow and abolition of the Monarchy; Establishment of Libyan Arab Republic; Start of Muammar Gaddafi's rule
First Sudanese Civil War (1955-1972)	(Egypt) Anglo-Egyptian Sudan (1955–1956); Republic of the Sudan (1956–1969); Democratic Republic of the Sudan (1969–1972); Combat support: Uganda (Joint operations on Ugandan territory, 1965–1969); Libyan Arab Republic (From 1969 and combat involvement at least in 1970); Non-combat support: United Arab Republic; Soviet Union; United Kingdom; China; Yugoslavia; East Germany; Czechoslovakia; Saudi Arabia; Kingdom of Libya (until 1969); Algeria; United States; West Germany	SDF mutineers, bandits, and unaffiliated separatist militias ALF (1965–1970); Anyanya (from 1963); Israel (from 1969); Supported by: Ethiopia; Uganda (from about 1970) (Democratic Republic of the Congo) Congo-Léopoldville; Kenya; France	Stalemate: Addis Ababa Agreement
Invasion of Uganda (1972)	Uganda; Libya; Palestine Liberation Organization (PLO)	Ugandan rebels: People's Army; UPC supporters; Tanzania	Ugandan government victory: Invasion by Obote loyalists repelled
Lebanese Civil War (1976)	(Arab League) ADF: Syrian Arab Republic; Saudi Arabia; Sudan; United Arab Emirates; Libya; South Yemen	LF	Withdrawal: Libyan forces essentially abandoned; Eventual termination of ADF mandate

== Great Socialist People's Libyan Arab Jamahiriya (1977-2011) ==
Conflict	Combatant 1	Combatant 2	Results
Egyptian–Libyan War (1977)	Libya	Egypt	Ceasefire
Uganda–Tanzania War (1978–1979)	Uganda; Libya; Palestine Liberation Organization; Supported by: Pakistan; Saudi Arabia	Tanzania; Uganda National Liberation Front: Kikosi Maalum; Front for National Salvation; Save Uganda Movement; Others; Mozambique; Supported by: Zambia; Angola; Ethiopia; Algeria	Tanzanian victory: Collapse of the Second Republic of Uganda
Chadian–Libyan conflict (1978–1987)	Libya: Islamic Legion; Pro-Libyan Chadian factions: FROLINAT; GUNT (1979–1986); Codos (1983–1986); FAP (1978–1986); Pro-Libyan Palestinian and Lebanese groups: PLO (1987); Abu Nidal Organization; Supported by: Algeria; East Germany; Soviet Union	Anti-Libyan Chadian factions: FAT (1978–1979); FAN (1978–1983); FANT (1983–1987); GUNT (1986–1987); France; Inter-African Force: Zaire; Nigeria; Senegal; NFSL Supported by: DR Sudan (1978–1985); Sudan (1985–1987); Egypt (1977-1981); Israel; Iraq; Algeria (pre-reapproachment); United States	Defeat: Chad regains control of the Aouzou Strip.
United States bombing of Libya (1986)	Libya	United States	Both sides claimed victory: Ground targets destroyed; Failed assassination attempt against Gaddafi; Failed Libyan Scud missile response; Libya renamed from Socialist People's Libyan Arab Jamahiriya to Great Socialist People's Libyan Arab Jamahiriya.
Second Sudanese Civil War (1986–1988)	Sudan: Armed Forces; PDF; Army of Peace; Muraheleen; (Rwanda) Ex-FAR and Interahamwe; SSDF; SPLA dissidents: SPLA-Nasir; SPLA-United; SSIM/A; Nuer White Army (Uganda) Ugandan insurgents: LRA; WNBF; UNRF (II); Iraq (Note: Iraqi support for Sudan during the war mostly consisted of weapons shipments; according to the South Sudanese, however, at least one unit of Iraqi paratroopers fought alongside the SAF near Juba. About 200 Iraqi soldiers were allegedly killed, and the site of their remains became known as "Jebel Iraqi". The International Institute for Strategic Studies also stated that Iraqi forces fought alongside Sudanese government troops.); China (Note: Although China was not officially involved in the war, it sent troops to the country in order to protect oil fields and thereby aid the Sudanese military. China also provided Sudan with weaponry.) Combat aid: Libya (1986–1991) Non-combat aid: Iran	SPLA: SPLA-Mainstream; SPLA-Agar; SPDF; ALF; Titweng; SSLM; NDA; Sudanese Alliance Forces; Anyanya II; Eastern Coalition; Derg (until 1987); PDR Ethiopia (1987–1988); Non-combat aid: Libya (1983–1985); Israel; Cuba (until 1991)	Stalemate: Libyan withdrawal in 1988; 2011 referendum and independence of the Republic of South Sudan
Second Congo War (1998-2003)	Libya; DR Congo; Chad; Namibia; Zimbabwe	Rwanda; Burundi; Uganda	Victory
2008 Kufra conflict (2008)	Libya	Toubou Front for the Salvation of Libya	Victory

== State of Libya (2011-present) ==
Conflict	Combatant 1	Combatant 2	Results
First Libyan Civil War (2011)	Libyan Arab Jamahiriya	(Libya) Anti-Gaddafi forces Qatar NATO: Belgium; Bulgaria; Canada; Denmark; France; Greece; Italy; Netherlands; Norway; Poland (only humanitarian and medical aid); Romania; Spain; Turkey; United Kingdom; United States; Other countries: Jordan; Qatar; Sweden; United Arab Emirates; Minor border clashes: Tunisia: Tunisian Army; Tunisian Police; Supported by: Egypt	Libyan opposition/NATO victory: Complete overthrow and collapse of the Gaddafi regime.; Killing of Muammar Gaddafi and end of his rule over Libya on 20 October 2011; Start and continuation of the Libyan Crisis; Assumption of interim control by National Transitional Council; remained in power until August 8, 2012; UN authorisation of NATO led military intervention; Diplomatic recognition of NTC as sole governing authority for Libya by 105 countries, UN, EU, AL and AU; Factional violence in the aftermath of the war leading to another civil war in 2014
War against the Islamic State (2013–present)	In multiple regions: CJTF–OIR; IMCTC; In Iraq: Iraq; Iraqi Kurdistan; United States; Iran; In Syria: Ba'athist Syria (2013–2024); Iran (2013–2024); Russia (2015–2024); Syrian caretaker government (2024–2025); Syrian transitional government (since 2025); Turkey; Syrian Salvation Government (2017–2024); Syrian Interim Government (2013–2025); Autonomous Administration of North and East Syria (2015–present); United States; In Egypt: Egypt (conflict since 2014); Israel; Hamas; In Libya: Libya Government of National Accord (2015–2021) Government of National Unity (since 2021) Tobruk-based government (2014–2021) Government of National Stability (since 2022); Egypt; France; United States; In Afghanistan: Islamic Republic of Afghanistan (2015–2021); Islamic Emirate of Afghanistan (since 2021) (the Taliban, in a conflict with IS since 2015); In Pakistan: Pakistan; China; In West Africa: Multinational Joint Task Force	Islamic State: Wilayat Libya (in Libya); Wilayat Sinai (in the Sinai peninsula); ISWAP (West Africa); IS-GS (Sahel); IS-CAP (Central Africa); Ansar al-Sunna (in Mozambique); Wilayat Khorasan (in Afghanistan and Iran); Wilayat Qavqaz (in the North Caucasus); Abu Sayyaf (in Southeast Asia); Wilayat Somalia (in Somalia); Wilayat Pakistan (in Pakistan)	Ongoing; IS militarily defeated in Iraq, Syria and Libya: Airstrikes on IS positions in Iraq, Syria, Libya, Nigeria and Afghanistan; Multinational humanitarian efforts; Arming and supporting local ground forces; Millions of civilians in Iraq and Syria flee their homes, sparking a refugee crisis; Terrorist attacks in Paris (Jan 2015 and Nov 2015), Brussels (Mar 2016) and many other places; Thousands of civilians executed by IS forces in Iraq and Syria; IS controlled around 40% of Iraq at its peak in mid-2014; IS controlled around 50% of Syria by late May 2015; Emergence of independently-governed Kurdish regions; IS military defeated and lost all of its territory in Libya in December 2017; Boko Haram loses territory, but its insurgency continues; IS controlled 5.67% of Syria's land by November 2017 and around 3% of Iraq by October 2017; IS loses all territory in Iraq and most territory in Syria in December 2017; IS loses all remaining territory in Syria in March 2019
Second Libyan Civil War (2014–2020)	House of Representatives (Tobruk-based): Libyan National Army; Libyan Air Force (LNA–aligned); Libyan Navy (LNA–aligned); Others: Zintan brigades; JEM (from 2016); SLM/A-Minnawi; Gaddafi loyalists; Popular Front for the Liberation of Libya; Warshefana militias; Wagner Group (from 2018) Egypt; United Arab Emirates; RSF (from 2019); Ba'athist Syria (2020); Hezbollah (allegedly); Israel (allegedly, denied by LNA); Iran Support: Russia; France; Saudi Arabia; Chad; Jordan; Belarus; Greece; Cyprus; United States; United Kingdom	(Libya) Government of National Accord (Tripoli-based) (from 2016): Libyan Ground Forces; Libyan Air Force (GNA–aligned); Libyan Navy (GNA–aligned); Others: Presidential Guard; Misrata Brigades; Sabratha Revolutionary Brigades; Petroleum Facilities Guard; Tripoli Protection Force (from 2018); Misratan Third Force; Tuareg militias of Ghat; Toubou Front for the Salvation of Libya; Chadian rebels (FACT, CCMSR, URF and UFDD); Turkey (2020) (Syrian opposition) Syrian National Army (from 2019) (Yemen) Popular Resistance Committees; Hamas (LNA claim, denied by Hamas) Support: Qatar; Sudan (until 2019); Pakistan; Iran; Morocco; Malta; Italy; European Union (except Greece, Cyprus and France); United Kingdom; United States (until 2019); Ukraine; Algeria; United Nations; (Libya) National Salvation Government (2014–2017): Libya Shield Force; LROR; Libyan National Guard; Support: Sudan (2014–16); Turkey (2014–16); Qatar (2014–16); Iran (allegedly); Ukraine; Islamic State (from 2014): Wilayat Barqa; Wilayat Tarabulus; Wilayat Fezzan; Support: AQIM (2014–2015; alleged in 2016); al-Qaeda in the Islamic Maghreb (2014–2017); Shura Council of Benghazi Revolutionaries (2014–2017) SCBR militia: Ansar al-Sharia (2014–2017); Libya Shield 1 (2014–16); Rafallah al-Sahati Brigade; Others: (Libya) Benghazi Defense Brigades; Ajdabiya Revolutionaries Shura Council (2015–16); (Libya) Derna Protection Force	Ceasefire: Permanent ceasefire ratified on 23 October 2020; LNA failed to conquer Tripoli; Government of National Unity formed on 10 March 2021; Continued Libyan Crisis

== See also ==
- Libyan resistance movement
