= Walid Ellafi =

Libyan producer, director and politician (born 1985)

- وليد اللافي
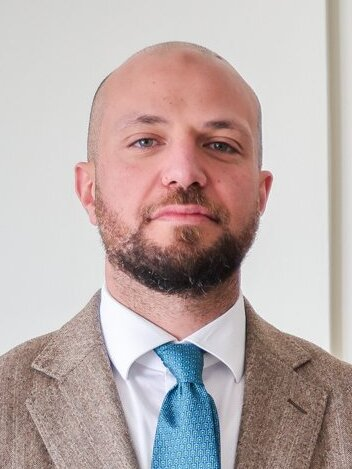
- Ellafi in 2024

Minister of State for Communication and Political Affairs (Government of National Unity)
- Incumbent
- Assumed office 15 March 2021
- Prime Minister: Abdul Hamid Dbeibeh
- Preceded by: Office established

Personal details
- Born: Walid Ammar Muhammad Ammar Ellafi; 9 July 1985 (age 41) Tripoli, Libya
- Party: Independent
- Other political affiliations: Muslim Brotherhood (2012–present) (Note: Ellafi has been a member of the Muslim Brotherhood since 2012, but remans registered as a political independent.)
- Children: 2
- Education: University of Tripoli; The Higher Institute of Computer Technology
- Website: walid-ellafi.com

Walid Ammar Muhammad Ammar Ellafi (Note: Arabic: وليد عمار محمد عمار اللافي, romanized: Walīadu ʿAmāri Muḥamãdi ʿAmāri al-lãạfīĩ).) (born 9 July 1985) is a Libyan producer, director and politician who has served as the minister of state for communication and political affairs in the Government of National Unity (GNU) since 2021. He also served as the acting minister of foreign affairs in the GNU from September to November 2023.

Ellafi was born in Tripoli and studied at the University of Tripoli and the Higher Institute of Computer Technology. He started his career as a developer at Microsoft, before founding and directing the media company Artec in 2008 and the IMG broadcasting group in 2013. He was the director of several media channels from 2014 to 2021, and has also produced and directed several Arabic television programmes and films since 2014.

An Islamist, Ellafi is known for his close relationship with Islamist militant leader Abdel Hakim Belhaj. He has aligned himself with the Muslim Brotherhood since the collapse of former Libyan leader Muammar Gaddafi's regime in 2011, but is registered as a political independent. In 2013, he became the head and director of Al-Naba TV, which he used to promote and support armed Islamic terrorist groups against the Libyan National Army and its commander Khalifa Haftar during the Second Libyan Civil War. After the end of the civil war, he was appointed to the GNU by Prime Minister Abdul Hamid Dbeibeh. As minister of state for communication and political affairs, he has organised government initiatives to implement Sharia law and promote what he sees as Islamic values across Libya.

== Early life and career ==
Walid Ammar Muhammad Ammar Ellafi was born on 9 July 1985 in Tripoli, Libya. He graduated from the University of Tripoli and the Higher Institute of Computer Technology in 2007.

In 2006, Ellafi worked as a developer at Microsoft. In 2008, he co-founded the media company Artec, where he was a director until 2013. In 2013, he became the founder and director of the broadcasting group IMG in 2013, and from 2014 to 2021 he also served as a director at several other media channels.

Following the overthrow of former Libyan leader Muammar Gaddafi in the First Libyan Civil War in 2011, Ellafi associated himself with Islamist movements in Libya. In 2013, he became the director and head of Al-Naba TV. During Ellafi's tenure at the organisation, the outlet supported several Islamist groups in Libya, including Al-Qaeda, the Shura Council of Benghazi Revolutionaries, Ansar Al-Sharia and the Shura Council of Mujahideen in Derna.

== Producing career ==
In 2020, Ellafi produced the Libyan television series El Zaiman (Al-Zaeeman, the Two Leaders) for Salami and the Government of National Accord, which ruled the west of Libya at the time.

== Political career ==
=== 2011–2021: Support for Islamist groups ===
Following the overthrow of former Libyan leader Muammar Gaddafi in the First Libyan Civil War in 2011, Ellafi associated himself with the Muslim Brotherhood, which he joined in 2012, though he has remained registered as a political independent. During this time, he became associated with the Islamist and Islamic extremist movement in Libya. He became known for his close relationship with Islamist militant leader Abdelhakim Belhaj and has been seen as the public face of the elusive leader in the media. In 2013, Belhaj founded the Islamist broadcaster Al-Nabaa TV and appointed Ellafi as the head and director of the broadcaster. Al-Nabaa TV served as the media arm of the Muslim Brotherhood in Libya. Ellafi also became an official for the media wings of the Benghazi Defence Brigades and the Libyan Islamic Fighting Group.

During Ellafi's tenure at Al-Nabaa TV, the organisation pursued an editorial policy of promoting and supporting several Islamic terrorist groups in Libya, including Al-Qaeda, the Shura Council of Benghazi Revolutionaries, the Shura Council of Mujahideen in Derna, the Islamic State in Libya and Ansar al-Sharia. The broadcaster spread disinformation and aired segments supporting these groups and endorsing their activities. Ellafi continued to hold sympathies for these groups later in his career, even after they disbanded. In 2021, while serving as a government minister, Ellafi was criticised after he said the classification of these groups as "extremist" was "not a definitive fact, just a point of view" and described them as "revolutionaries" who had the best interests for the Libyan people. Under Ellafi, Al-Nabaa TV was proscribed as a terrorist channel by several Arab countries, including the internationally recognised government of Libya at the time.

By 2015, Al-Nabaa TV had become the main backer of the Islamist National Salvation Government (NSG), supported by the Muslim Brotherhood, in the Libyan media. In the same year, Ellafi and the outlet drew criticism for denying the kidnapping and beheading of Copts in Libya. A reporter on the outlet falsely claimed that a video of the beheadings by the Islamic State was fake, as the group could not have perpetrated the attack because of their limited supplies and influence. When the Islamic State controlled Benghazi, Al-Nabaa TV was allowed to report freely in the city.

From 2015, Al-Nabaa TV became a staunch opponent of the eastern forces of the Libyan National Army and Khalifa Haftar, after the military commander announced a campaign against Islamist forces in the east of Libya. Ellafi used the broadcaster to support Islamist groups against Haftar's forces. A personal opponent of Haftar, Ellafi also provided financial support to the Shura Council of Benghazi Revolutionaries to prolong the conflict against Haftar in the Benghazi region. In August 2017, the Haftar-supporting House of Representatives issues a list of Libyan terrorists with the Qatari government, which included Ellafi for his work with Islamists. After Haftar expelled the Islamists from the east later that year, Ellafi fled to Turkey.

=== 2021–present: Government of National Unity ===
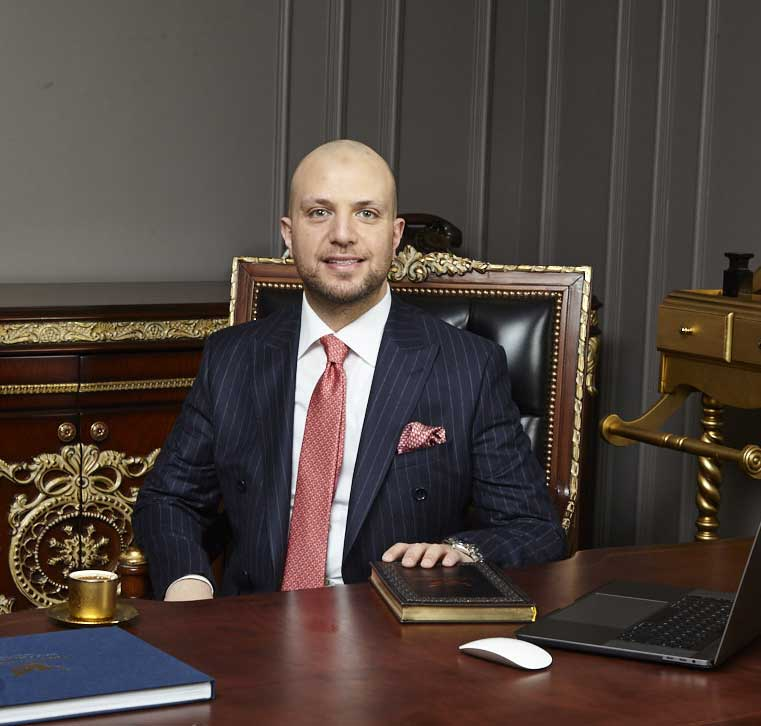
Ellafi in March 2021, around a week and a half after he was appointed to the GNU

On 15 March 2021, Ellafi was appointed as the new minister of state for communication and political affairs in the newly formed Government of National Unity (GNU) led by Prime Minister Abdul Hamid Dbeibeh. Ellafi's appointment to the unity government, whose members were appointed through a series of negotiations brokered by the United Nations, was proposed by the Libyan Muslim Brotherhood leader Ali al-Sallabi to ensure the group had political representation in the new government. In this office, he is responsible for the GNU's media policy and communications, as well as for supporting the conduct of elections. Ellafi's appointment drew criticism from political observers because of his past connections to terrorism.

== Personal life ==
Ellafi is married with two children. He speaks Arabic. Politically, he is an Islamist, though he is registered as an independent.
