= List of organizations designated as terrorist by Bahrain =

Organizations designated as terrorist by Bahrain are organizations that have been designated by the Bahrain government as terrorist organisations. The Ministry of Foreign Affairs maintains a public list of designated terrorist individuals and entities.

== List ==
As of 28 March 2024, the list of designates 95 entities as terrorist:

1. Hezbollah
2. Ansar al-Islam fi Kurdistan
3. Islamic State of Iraq and the Levant
4. Al-Qaeda in the Arabian Peninsula
5. Al-Nusra Front
6. Abu Sayyaf Group
7. Harkat-ul-Mujahideen
8. Al-Qaeda
9. Islamic Movement of Uzbekistan
10. Jaish-e-Mohammed
11. Lashkar-e-Taiba
12. Osbat al-Ansar
13. Al-Qaeda in the Islamic Maghreb
14. Tehrik-i-Taliban Pakistan / Pakistani Taliban
15. Abdullah Azzam Brigades
16. Ansar Dine
17. Boko Haram
18. Ansar al-Sharia in Benghazi
19. Ansar al-Sharia in Derna
20. Jemaah Islamiyah
21. Lashkar-e-Jhangvi
22. Harkat-ul-Jihad al-Islami
23. Jamaah Ansharut Tauhid
24. Ansaru
25. Al-Mulathameen
26. Ansar al-Sharia in Tunisia
27. Al-Mourabitoun
28. Armed Islamic Group of Algeria
29. Dhamat Houmet Da'wa Salafia
30. Eastern Turkistan Islamic Movement
31. Egyptian Islamic Jihad
32. Caucasus Emirate
33. Global Relief Foundation
34. Harakat Sham al-Islam
35. Hilal Ahmar Society Indonesia
36. Islamic Army of Aden
37. Islamic International Brigade
38. Islamic Jihad Group
39. Jama'atu Ahlis Sunna Lidda'awati wal-Jihad (Boko Haram)
40. Jund al-Khilafah (ISIL-AP)
41. Libyan Islamic Fighting Group
42. Services Centre
43. Moroccan Islamic Combatant Group
44. Muhammad Jamal Group
45. Mujahidin Indonesia Timur
46. Movement for Oneness and Jihad in West Africa
47. Rajah Sulaiman Movement
48. Society of the Revival of Islamic Heritage
49. Riyad-us Saliheen Brigade of Martyrs
50. Islamic Jihad Battalion (Russia)
51. Jaish al-Muhajireen wal-Ansar
52. Tunisian Combatant Group
53. Ummah Tameer-e-Nau
54. The Wafa Humanitarian Organization (Afghanistan)
55. Islamic Union (Somalia)
56. Al-Akhtar Trust International
57. Al-Haramain Foundation
58. Afghan Support Committee
59. Signers in Blood (Mali)
60. Al Furqan
61. Al Rashid Trust
62. Al Ihsan Charitable Society
63. Society of Islamic Cooperation (Jam'yah Ta'awun Al-Islamia)
64. Rabita Trust
65. Taibah International-Bosnia Offices
66. February 14 Youth Coalition
67. Al-Ashtar Brigades
68. The Popular Resistance Brigades (Bahrain)
69. Qatar Volunteer Center
70. Doha Apple Company
71. Qatar Charity
72. Sheikh Eid bin Mohammad Al Thani Charitable Association
73. Foundation Sheikh Thani Ibn Abdullah for Humanitarian Services
74. Benghazi Defense Brigades
75. Bahraini Hezbollah
76. Al Mukhtar Bridges
77. Bahrain Freedom Movement
78. Al-Balagh Charitable Foundation
79. Al-Ihsan Charitable Society (Yemen)
80. Al Rahma Charitable Organization
81. Shura Council of Benghazi Revolutionaries
82. Al-Saraya Media Center
83. Boshra News Agency
84. Rafallah al-Sahati Brigade
85. Nabaa TV (Libya)
86. Tanasuh Foundation for Dawa, Culture and Media
87. Rahmah Charitable Organization
88. Al Khayr Supermarket
89. International Islamic Council
90. International Union of Muslim Scholars
91. Al-Inma Group
92. Al-Inmaa Engineering and Contracting
93. The SPECTRUM Group (Spectrum Investment Group Holding SAL)
94. Maher Trading and Construction Company
95. Islamic Revolutionary Guard Corps
96. Basij
97. Bonyad Tavon Basij (also known as: Basij Cooperative Foundation).
98. Bank Eghtesad Mehr (also known as: Non-Profit Bank Mehr).
99. Bank Mellat
100. Iran's Eghtesad Mehr Investment Company (also known as: Iran's Eghtesad Mehr Investment Company, Iran's Mehr Economic Investment Company, Iran's Mehr Economic Investments). 101. Tadbergan Atieh Iranian Investment Company.
101. Negin Sahel Royal Investment Company (also known as Negin Sahel Royal Company).
102. Mehr Financial Group.
103. Technotar Engineering Company.
104. Taktar Investment Company.
105. Iran Tractor Manufacturing Company (also known as Iran Tractor Manufacturing Company).
106. Iran Zinc Mines Development Company.
107. Calcinin (also known as Calcinin).
108. Qeshm Smelting and Reduction Company (also known as Qeshm Smelting and Reduction Complex).
109. Bandar Abbas Zinc Production Company.
110. Zanjan Acid Production Company. (Known as: Acid and Vanilla Makers, Zanjan Acid Makers, Zanjan Acid Manufacturers).
111. Iranian Chemical Catalysts Company.
112. Mobarakeh Steel Company
113. Andisheh Mahfaran Investment Company.
114. Farsi Bank.
115. Sina Bank
116. Bahman Group
117. Tawassul Company.
118. Al-Khalidi Exchange Company.
119. Najat Social Welfare Organization.
120. Africo 1 Offshore Foundation (SAL Shore-Off 1 Africo) (Location: Lebanon).
121. Kish BNA Club (Club I&P Kish) (Location: Iran). 124. Hokoul Offshore Company (L.A.S.) - Location: Lebanon.
122. Talaqi Group - Location: Lebanon.
123. Alumix - Location: Lebanon.
124. Hayat Al Nagham - Location: Syria.
125. Tawafuk - Location: Lebanon.
126. Hamrahan Pishro Trading Company - Location: Iran. -130
127. Quds Force - Iranian Revolutionary Guard Corps (GF-IRGC) (Force) – Location: Iran.
128. Ansar Brokerage Bank Company – Location: Iran.
129. Ansar Exchange – Location: Iran.
130. Atlas Exchange – Location: Iran.
131. General Janoob-Al Tharwat Manabea Company for General Trading (Company Trading) – Location: Iran.
132. Taif Mining Services LLC – Location: Sultanate of Oman.
133. Al-Fay Financial Services Company – Headquartered in Türkiye.
134. Sam Oil Trading and Oil Services Limited (Import and Export of Oil and Commercial Agencies / Headquartered in Yemen).
135. Al-Zahra Trading and Agencies Establishment (Import and Export of Oil, and Sale of Stationery and Office Supplies / Headquartered in Yemen).
136. Abraj Yemen and Black Gold Companies (Import and Export of Oil / Headquartered in Yemen).
137. Fuel Oil Company for Importing Petroleum Products (Import and Export of Oil / Headquartered in Yemen).
138. Salam Road Trading and Import Company (Import and Export of Oil / Headquartered in Yemen).
139. Abkar Services and Oil Company. 143. Al-Faqih International Trading, Industry, and Oil Services Limited (Manufacturing, trading, importing, and exporting plastics, petroleum derivatives, household appliances, foodstuffs, medical supplies, electronics, vehicle spare parts, agricultural materials, building materials, and others / Headquarters in Yemen).
140. Saba International Tobacco Limited (Trading, manufacturing, and importing tobacco and cigarettes, and commercial agencies / Headquarters in Yemen).
141. Oil Primer Company (Importing and exporting oil / Headquarters in Yemen).
142. Yemen Abbott Trading Limited (Manufacturing, trading, importing, and exporting tobacco, matches, plastics, household appliances, foodstuffs, medical supplies, electronics, vehicle spare parts, agricultural materials, building materials, and others / Headquarters in Yemen).
143. Sahari Exchange and Money Transfer Company (Buying and Selling Foreign Currencies and Domestic and International Money Transfers / Headquartered in Yemen).
144. FZE Trading General Adoon Company (General Trading / Somalia and the UAE).
145. LLC Trading General Adoon Company (General Trading / UAE).
146. Sirkti Anonim Ticaret Ve Sanayi Gida Trading General Adoon Company (General Trading / Turkey).
147. Sweid & Sons Exchange Company (CO Exchange For Sons And Sweid) (Exchange Company / Yemen).
148. Al-Amir Engineering, Construction and General Trading Company (Headquartered in Lebanon).
149. Offshore SAL Group Golden (based in Lebanon).
150. SARL Trading Group Golden (based in Lebanon).
151. Limited Construction Nail and Hammer (based in Zambia).
152. Limited Investment Hamidco (based in Zambia).
153. Construction S.A.L. (based in Lebanon).
154. Jamoul & Ayad for Industry and Trade (based in Lebanon).
155. SARL Metics Land (based in Lebanon).
156. Shore-Off SAL Metics Land (based in Lebanon).
157. Konfekionsbugelei GmbH Fashion Top (based in Germany).
158. Tourism (based in Lebanon).
159. Al-Qatarji Foundation (based in Syria).
160. Houthis
161. Muath Abdullah Dael Import and Export Company (based in Yemen).
162. Global Express Exchange and Money Transfer Company (based in Yemen).
163. Al-Hadha Exchange Company (based in Yemen).
164. Peridot Trading and Shipping Company (based in Sharjah, UAE).
165. Safiran Airport Services (based in Tehran, Iran).
166. Pars Paravar Company (based in Tehran, Iran).
167. DAMA Aircraft Engine Design and Manufacturing Company (based in Tehran, Iran).
168. Baharestan Company Kish (based in Tehran, Iran).

== See also ==
- List of designated terrorist groups
