= Battle of Benghazi (2014) =

Battle of the Second Libyan Civil War

- Part of the Libyan civil war (2014–2020)
Date	16 May – 29 July 2014 (2 months, 1 week and 6 days)
Location	Benghazi, Libya
Result	The Shura Council of Benghazi Revolutionaries victory: Beginning of Second Libyan Civil War; Withdrawal of Libyan National Army from Benghazi; Declaring of Benghazi as an Islamic emirate; Continue clashes between two Belligerents led to Battle of Benina Airport

Belligerents
(Libya) Libyan National Army	Shura Council of Benghazi Revolutionaries; ISIL linked Factions: Youth Shura Council Derna; Ansar al sharia brigades; Jund al-Khilafah

Commanders and leaders
Gen. Khalifa Haftar (Commander of Operation Dignity); Col. Wanis Abu Khamada (Commander of Libya's Special Forces); Brig. Gen. Saqr Geroushi (Commander of the Libyan Air Force)	Mohamed al-Zahawi (Ansar al-Sharia Leader); Wissam Ben Hamid (Libya Shield 1 Commander)

Strength
900+ soldiers	14,000+ rebels

Casualties and losses
196–367 killed	Unknown
- *The number of dead on the army side includes both opposition fighters and civilians

The Battle of Benghazi was a battle of the Second Libyan Civil War. It was fought in May and July 2014 between the Islamic Shura Council of Benghazi Revolutionaries (supported by the LROR and Misrata Brigades) and the Libyan National Army, and some residents which stood with the army in the city. The Shura Council of Benghazi Revolutionaries led by Ansar al-Sharia (Libya) has been designated as a terrorist organization by the United Nations, Turkey, the United Arab Emirates, the United Kingdom and the United States.

== Background ==
Hostilities first broke out early in the morning of Friday 16 May 2014 when Gen. Haftar's forces assaulted the bases of certain Benghazi Islamist militia groups, including the one blamed for the 2012 assassination of US ambassador Christopher Stevens. Helicopters, jets and ground forces took part in the assault, killing at least 70, and injuring at least 250. Haftar has vowed to not stop until the extremists groups are purged. Shortly before the assault Haftar reportedly asked a close friend, "Am I committing suicide?"

The operation, codenamed "Operation Dignity" by Haftar, began when forces loyal to General Haftar attacked units of the February 17th Martyrs Brigade, the Libya Shield No. 1 Brigade (also known as Deraa No. 1 Brigade), and Ansar al-Sharia. Fighting was largely confined to the south western Benghazi districts of Hawari and Sidi Ferej. In particular the fighting focused on the area between the south-western gate checkpoint and the cement factory; an area controlled by Ansar al-Sharia. As part of the fighting helicopters were seen over Hawari. Fighting was also reported in the port area between marines and the Libya Shield No. 1 (Deraa No. 1) Brigade.

== Result ==
On 29 July, Shura Council of Benghazi Revolutionaries including Ansar al-Sharia seized a military base in Benghazi that served as the headquarters of the Saiqa Special Forces Brigade; a unit that supports General Khalifa Haftar. Saiqa Special Forces officer Fadel Al-Hassi claimed that Saiqa abandoned the base, which included both Camp 36 in the Bu Attni district as well as the special forces school, after coming under heavy shelling. The battle for the base involved the use of rockets and warplanes, and resulted in the deaths of at least 30 people. During the fighting a pro-Haftar MiG crashed into waste ground in Kuwaifiya, although the pilot however managed to eject. Operation Dignity Spokesperson Mohamed Hejazi claimed that the aircraft had suffered a technical malfunction, and insisted it had not been shot down. Following the fall of the base, video footage emerged of Mohamed al-Zahawi, the head of Ansar al-Sharia, as well as Wissam Ben Hamid, the leader of Libya Shield 1, standing outside the base. Saiqa initially denied the loss of the base, although Saiqa Commander Wani Bukhamada acknowledged the loss by the afternoon of the 29th. A senior Saiqa official later claimed to the Libya Herald that Saiqa losses in Benghazi between the 21 and 30 July totaled some 63 dead and 200 wounded. Whilst the official was unsure of the number of Islamist dead, he claimed that it was in the dozens. The fighting, having involved indiscriminate shelling and bombing in and around the predominantly residential area of Buatni, also resulted in dozens of civilians being killed in crossfire.

== Aftermath ==
Beginning of Battle of Benina Airport.
