= Al-Mahdi Al-Barghathi =

Libyan politician

Al Mahdi Al Barghathi
- المهدي البرغثي

Minister of Defense
- In office 5 January 2016 – 29 July 2018 suspended: 1 May 2017 – 28 July 2018
- President: Fayez al-Sarraj
- Preceded by: Abdullah al-Thani (General National Congress)
- Succeeded by: Fayez al-Sarraj

Personal details
- Born: c. 1968 Benghazi, Libya
- Died: October 2023 (aged 54–55) Benghazi, Libya

Military service
- Allegiance: Libyan Arab Jamahiriya; Libya (House of Representatives); Libya (GNA)
- Branch/service: Libyan National Army (former); Libyan Ground Forces
- Rank: Colonel
- Commands: 204 Tank Brigade; Libyan National Army
- Battles/wars: Libyan Civil War Second Libyan Civil War: Benghazi Operation Dignity Battle; Second Battle of Benghazi; Sirte offensive (2016)

Al Mahdi Ibrahim Abdulhamid Al Barghathi was an important figure in the Awakir tribe and army commander based in Benghazi who was likely executed in October 2023. Al Barghathi was an army commander of the Libyan National Army the commander of the 204th Tank Battalion of the, serving under General Khalifa Haftar in the Libyan Civil War. Al Barghathi became disillusioned with Haftar's policies, and in 2016 became the Minister of Defense of the opposing Libyan Government of National Accord, serving in that function until 2018. Since 2016, Al Barghathi and allies have been targeted for assassination by Haftar, and on 6 October 2023, Al Barghathi was abducted in Benghazi, along with close supporters, family, and other friends. On 30 October 2023 Al Barghathi was reported to have died while in detention.

== Biography ==
Al Barghathi was born in Benghazi and fought in the Libyan Civil War against the forces of Muammar Qaddafi, being among the first officers to join the rebels. In 2014 he joined General Khalifa Haftar's Operation Dignity against the Islamists in the General National Congress and commanded the 204 Tank Battalion. He reportedly became a popular officer in the Libyan armed forces for personally fighting on the front line with the troops.

Al Barghathi's appointment as the minister of defense of the Government of National Accord in January 2016, formed with international support to reunify Libya, caused disagreements with Field Marshal Haftar. The general believed he was not fit for the role and opposed his appointment. Also, Al Barghathi was an ally of Ibrahim Jadhran, leader of the Petroleum Facilities Guards and rival of Haftar. Al Barghathi stated that he remained loyal to the army as an institution and was determined to run it effectively. The Libyan Air Force chief of staff under Haftar, Saqr Geroushi, said that al Barghathi should be arrested for becoming the defense minister in the GNA without the commander-in-chief's permission.

It was reported that he personally led Libyan unity government forces during the offensive to retake the city of Sirte from the Islamic State of Iraq and the Levant.

In March 2017, after Haftar's LNA seized control of the oil facilities in eastern Libya, Al Barghathi was accused of supporting the Benghazi Defense Brigades that fought against the LNA. However, he denied this allegation.

In May 2017, GNA Prime Minister Fayez Seraj announced that Al Barghathi was suspended as defense minister after being suspected of involving in the Brak Al-Shati massacre.

By December 2017 it appeared that he was no longer suspended and resumed his role as defense minister. Early that month, he visited Libyan soldiers receiving medical treatment in neighboring Tunisia.

In July 2018 he was removed from the office after disagreements with Prime Minister Fayez al-Sarraj.

Since 2018, Benghazi groups lobbied for Al Barghathi to be given amnesty and be allowed to return home. Eventually permission was given from Haftar, and on October 6, 2023, he returned to his family home. The day began with celebration, as Al Barghathi a prominent figure within his community, hadn't been home since 2016. At 5 pm, internet and communications were cut off in Benghazi, followed by members of the Tariq Ben Zeyad Brigade storming the house, and kidnapping Al Bargathi as well as 7 close allies and other friends and family members. Besides the 7 other men, all women and children were eventually released. 60 to 70 people are also reported to have died during the kidnapping. On 30 October 2023, it was announced by the municipality of Benghazi Facebook account that Al Barghathi had died of a stroke during his detention, however it is suspected that he was executed earlier.
