= Battle of Benghazi (2014–2017) =

Battle during the Second Libyan Civil War

- Part of the Libyan civil war (2014–2020)
- The situation in August 2016; before the LNA captured the Gwarsha and Ganfouda districts
Date	15 October 2014 – 30 December 2017^{[a]} (3 years, 2 months, 2 weeks and 1 day)
Location	Benghazi, Libya 32.1167°N 20.0667°E
Result	Major Libyan National Army victory; Ansar al-Sharia dissolves itself; BRSC's Libya Martyrs' Brigade announces withdrawal of surviving fighters to Derna

Belligerents
(Libya) Libyan National Army; Benghazi Security Directorate; Supported by: France; DGSE; Special Forces	Shura Council of Benghazi Revolutionaries; (Libya) Benghazi Defense Brigades; Ansar al-Sharia; Libya Shield 1; Supported by: (Libya) LROR	Islamic State of Iraq and the Levant (from Nov. 2014 to Jan. 2017): Wilayat Barqa

Commanders and leaders
Field Marshal Khalifa Haftar (Commander of Operation Dignity); Colonel Abdussalam Al-Hassi (Commander of the LNA's Benghazi operations room); Col. Wanis Abu Khamada (Commander of Libya's Special Forces); Brig. Gen. Saqr Geroushi (Commander of the Libyan Air Force); Salem Al-Naaili † (Libyan Special Forces top commander); Ahmed Abu-Bakr Huttea Al-Zwai † (Field commander)	Mohamed al-Zahawi † (Ansar al-Shariah Leader); Abu Khalid Al-Madani † (Zahawi's Successor); Ibrahim Bunuwara (POW) (Ansar al-Shariah top commander); Wissam Ben Hamid † (Libya Shield 1 Commander); Younis Al Louhicha † (Field commander); Jalal Makhzum †	Abdul Qader al-Najdi

Strength
25,000	SCBR: several thousand (in 2014)	ISIL: Unknown

Casualties and losses
(Libya) 5,000+ killed 3 DGSE operators killed, 1 helicopter downed	Unknown	Unknown
- ^{a} Despite the LNA's declaration of victory on 5 July 2017, the battle continued with militants still holding 150 m^{2} of territory, which was reportedly reduced to just one building by 27 July. The militant-controlled area was cleared on 30 December.

The Battle of Benghazi (2014–2017) was a major battle of the Second Libyan Civil War that raged from October 2014 to December 2017, between the Shura Council of Benghazi Revolutionaries, Islamic State of Iraq and the Levant in Libya, and the Libyan National Army (LNA), and paramilitaries supporting the LNA in the city. The battle was a direct consequence of the failed Benina Airport Offensive by the Benghazi Revolutionaries and their allies, which allowed LNA forces to regroup and attack deep into Benghazi.

By May 2016, the LNA controlled at least 90% of the city, including Ansar Al-Sharia's main neighborhood of Al-Laithi, Benghazi University, and the Cement Factory.

A number of Benghazi revolutionaries regrouped later on and announced the formation of the Benghazi Defense Brigades in June 2016, to support the Shura Council. Despite LNA General Khalifa Haftar's declaration of the "liberation" of the city, dozens of gunmen remained fortified and besieged in Sidi Akribesh, according to sources close to military, with the final pocket persisting until December 2017.

== Background ==
Heavy clashes broke out in Benghazi on 16 May 2014 with the LNA attacking the militias in the city. The attack was led by Khalifa Haftar, the commander of the LNA. He declared it was launched to clear the city of Islamist militias and "restore Libya's dignity". However during the summer of 2014, the Benghazi revolutionaries, an alliance of former rebels and Islamist militants, launched constant attacks against LNA bases and headquarters, eventually forcing the LNA to retreat to the nearby town of Benina. On 30 July 2014 Ansar al-Sharia, one of the militant Islamist groups within the Shura Council, stated it had taken complete control over Benghazi. The announcement came after they had seized the headquarters of the special forces of the Libyan National Army.

With the retreat of the LNA from Benghazi proper, the city's airport (located 15 km east in the town of Benina) became one of the last areas still held by the army. The LNA managed to repel the attempt by militants to seize the airport in the Battle of Benina Airport, inflicting high casualties on the Islamist fighters, and setting the stage for the LNA operation to recapture Benghazi.

== Timeline of the battle ==
=== Operation launched ===
On 14 October 2014, Khalifa Haftar declared he would "liberate the city" from "terrorists". Troops loyal to him and allied to the army, launched an offensive on 15 October with some residents allying with his forces to dismantle checkpoints set up by Islamists. Per hospital medics, at least nine soldiers and four civilians were found dead on a street during the clashes, with two soldiers wounded. Haftar's forces and the army stated on 17 October they were in complete control of the camp of February 17th Martyrs Brigade. Meanwhile, Red Crescent called for a ceasefire.

At least 18 people were killed in fighting on 17 October according to Benghazi Medical Centre, with the dead being mostly soldiers and allied civilian from the central al-Majouri neighbourhood. The total death toll climbed to 52 according to hospital figures. Farraj Hashem, the spokesman of Libya's elected parliament called House of Representatives which had relocated to Tobruk, announced that the parliament had endorsed Haftar's "Operation Dignity" against the Islamists and had given him an official role.

After the militants were expelled from the airport and the February 17 camp, fighting broke out in the campus of University of Benghazi between Ansar al-Sharia and the army, as well as areas around the February 17 camp. Units of the Libyan Army also clashed with the Islamists in other areas according to residents. Meanwhile, the death toll in the clashes rose to 130 by 26 October. Ten people were killed on 29 October according to medics as several residential districts were hit by rockets and artillery shells, with the death toll rising to at least 180.

Special Forces commander Wanis Bukhamada stated on 31 October that his troops had recaptured four army barracks after two weeks of clashes, as well as the eastern road leading out of the city. He also claimed the army was in control of 80% of the city. The death toll meanwhile rose to 210 according to medics.

=== Stalemate and Port of Benghazi ===
On 3 November, Libyan Army urged residents to evacuate Islamist-controlled Assabri district which houses the Port of Benghazi. Ansar al-Sharia had retreated to the district after the Army had taken control of other areas. A ship of the Libyan Navy was struck during heavy clashes that involved airplanes and tanks according to residents. Five pro-government soldiers were killed and 28 wounded on 8 November, with the death toll rising to 300 according to medics.

Fighters loyal to Islamic State of Iraq and Levant were reported to have expanded their presence westwards from Derna along the coast, including in Benghazi.

About 400 were killed by 29 November according to medics, with the fighting focused on the port in the past three weeks. About 50 were killed in the next 10 days, medical personnel stated on 10 December. The fighting had become a stalemate around the port. Mohamed El Hejazi, Haftar's spokesman as well as the spokesman for the army in eastern Libya, stated that reinforcements were arriving from Tobruk and Ajdabiya.

By 18 December, at least 25 people had been killed and 103 wounded over the previous eight days according to medics, bringing the death toll to 475 as clashes continued in the port. The death toll climbed to 600 by 18 January 2015, according to medics, with the army trying to capture the port and two other districts where they claimed Ansar al-Sharia was holed up, with the army controlling most of the city according to Reuters. Mohamed El Hejazi claimed the army controlled 90% of the city.

=== Renewed advance ===
Heavy clashes erupted on 6 February 2015 as pro-government forces pushed to capture the port. Army vehicles advanced along the Corniche gate to the gate of the port and a nearby court building. They also captured several government buildings. Seven soldiers were killed and 25 wounded according to military officials. Two people were killed and 20 wounded, according to medics and military officials, in a car bomb attack on a military base in Lithi neighborhood where the military and Islamists were fighting.

The death toll of the battle rose to 700 on 8 February according to medics. Libyan special forces declared on 9 February 2015 that they had captured the main military base, on a road to the airport, from the Islamists. Military official Fadil Hassi stated that two people were killed and 30 injured when at least two rockets struck downtown Benghazi. Bukhamada meanwhile claimed that his troops had captured a large part of the airport road.

=== Slowdown ===
The House of Representatives appointed Haftar as the commander of the armed forces in early March. Seven soldiers were killed according to Fadl al-Hasi, in a suicide car bomb attack on an army checkpoint in Laithi district. ISIL claimed the attack with the military carrying out air strikes in response. Meanwhile, two people were killed when a rocket hit a residential building. Medics stated on 11 April that ten soldiers were killed and 55 wounded with a tank battalion and armed youths clashing against the Shura for most of the previous day.

Two civilians were killed and four wounded when a residential building was struck by a rocket on 7 May. The death toll of the battle rose to 53 in the past five weeks. Around 17 civilians were killed since April while 90 were wounded in artillery and rocket strikes. Thirty-six soldiers and armed youths were killed while about 270 were wounded in street clashes since April. Hejazi blamed the Islamists for firing rockets whenever the army attacked their areas, though this was denied by the Islamist faction.

Nine soldiers were killed in clashes on 20 May. Thirty soldiers were wounded according to a military spokesman. He also stated that the special forces, backed by helicopters, had recaptured several government buildings. A military spokesman stated on 1 June that they were facing an ammunition shortage. Progress had stalled as Shura fighters were holed up in several districts as well as the port. Meanwhile, hospital sources said that 57 soldiers had been killed and 170 were wounded in May.

=== Offensive stalls ===
Medics stated on 11 July that around 19 people were killed and 80 wounded in clashes in past three days with heavy clashes in the Laithi area where Islamist fighters attacked soldiers who had cut off the main streets into the district. ISIL stated on 15 July that it had killed a Libyan Army commander Salem al-Naili as the offensive appeared to stall. Army officials stated he was killed in clashes in Laithi along with another soldier.

The offensive stalled by August with the army receiving high casualties as it lacked training and weapons for street clashes. Special forces spokesman Milad al-Zwai stated that 25 soldiers were killed and 35 wounded in July. A tank battalion fought against Islamist brigades trying to advance on 30 August. Four soldiers were killed and six wounded according to medics. Pro-ISIL fighters trying to capture tanks attacked a LNA post in Annawaghia, a town 8 kilometres (5 mi) southwest of Benghazi. At least seven soldiers were killed while repelling the attack.

At least 16 people were killed according to a military commander on 11 November. Military spokesman Milad Zwei, meanwhile, stated that they had captured the air defense camp between Mash'hash and Sidi Faraj districts. Medical officials stated on 20 February 2016 that 14 people were killed in clashes between LNA and Islamist militants. A military spokesman told Reuters that most of the clashes were occurring in the neighborhood of Botani.

=== Summer 2016 advance ===
LNA claimed on 21 February that they had pushed back Islamists in several areas and had taken further territory including the strategic port of Marisa as well as the nearby Al-Halis district. On 23 February, the army captured the Laithi area, which was notorious as a nerve centre of ISIL. The military stated it had seized complete control of Boatni and Laithi districts.

A hospital source stated on 16 April that at least 15 soldiers were killed in clashes in the past two days with 40 being wounded. ISIL had attempted two suicide attacks near a cement factory to the west of the city where fighters were holding out, though only one struck the troops per Milad al-Zawie. ISIL claimed to have killed dozens of soldiers, though Zawie stated 6 were killed and 25 wounded.

Zawie stated on 18 April that the troops had captured a cement factory and cemetery in El Hawari district where pro-ISIL fighters had been holding out. He also stated that they had captured a camp behind Garyounis University. They thus built on their advance in February when they had captured Laithi and Boatni districts.

By 22 June, the LNA captured the Gharyounis district and most of the tourist village at Ganfouda, under the control of Benghazi Shura. On the same day, 11 fighters affiliated with Khalifa Haftar-led Dignity Operation forces were killed and almost 5 others were injured due to clashes with the Benghazi Shura Council, according to a source.

=== Attempted BDB offensive towards Benghazi ===
The Benghazi Defense Brigades (BDB), a new grouping allied with the Shura Council Islamists, was founded on 1 June 2016, combining soldiers, ex-policemen and Islamist mujahideen previously expelled from Benghazi by the LNA. After an attack on Ajdabiya in late June, its commander Mustafa al-Sharkasi announced their intention to advance and retake Benghazi. BDB sources stated on 10 July 2016 that it had captured Sultan and Al-Jeldaya checkpoint, however LNA refuted this, stating the attack was repelled. BDB's media wing announced on 16 July it had started moving towards Benghazi after capturing many areas west of it including Al-Magroon and were 60 to 70 kilometres away from Benghazi.

On 17 July, BDB claimed it had shot down a LNA helicopter in Al-Magroon. The militia later on 19 July reported that two French special forces troops were possibly among the crew killed in the crash. A day later, French government confirmed that three French special forces soldiers had died in the crash. French military and intelligence presence was announced in February 2016, after a small detachment of Special Forces and DGSE based out of Benina Airport assisted the Tobruk-based Libyan National Army. The detachment had been in Libya for several months, and coordinated the November US strike on Derna which killed the most senior ISIL leader in the country, Iraqi Abu Nabil al-Anbari.

BDB stated on 20 July that 13 of its fighters were killed in retaliatory French airstrikes near Benghazi. Red Crescent stated that it had received 17 bodies from districts bombed to east of Benghazi. After an overnight air attack and LNA advance, BDB were reported to be retreating towards Sultan while LNA entered Magroon. BDB was reported to have retreated back to Al Jufra Airbase on 22–23 July.

Libyan Air Force commander Saqr Geroushi meanwhile in July confirmed the presence of soldiers of Western nations in Libya. He stated that 20 troops from United States, France and United Kingdom were stationed at Benina airbase, stating they were only "monitoring the movements of the Islamic State jihadists and how they store ammunition" but "there are no (foreign) pilots fighting in the place of our pilots and fighters."

However many sources indicates that French Special Forces and DGSE along with other unit were actually operating on the ground during the battle for the city. It seems that French leads at least 4 raid in February and were active in fight alongside the LNA.

=== LNA capture of Gwarsha and advance into Ganfouda ===
On 20 August 2016, the LNA captured several parts of the Gwarsha district and offered ceasefire to the militants if they surrendered. On 2 August 2016, a car bomb attack claimed by the Shura Council of Benghazi Revolutionaries in a residential district in Guwarsha district of western Benghazi targeting Libyan National Army killed at least 22 and injured another 20 more people.

On 30 August 2016, media sources reported five fighters from Dignity Operation were killed and others were injured in fierce clashes when pro-Haftar forces tried to advance into the Al-Yasameen Summer Resort which was captured by Benghazi Shura Council the day before. On 6 September, sources from the Benghazi Shura Council reported Tuesday that four fighters from Dignity Operation forces of Khalifa Haftar were killed and others were wounded by a landmine blast in Gawarcha frontline.

On 16 November, the LNA captured Gwarsha Gate, as well as the Gwarsha district on the next day and were besieging fighters from the Benghazi Revolutionary Shura Council in Ganfouda. Twenty-three soldiers were killed in the clashes, while 60 were wounded.

LNA captured over 20 square kilometres of area in Ganfouda by 20 November, with Shura-held territory being reduced to less than 6 square kilometres. A mufti of the Shura Council was also killed in the clashes. On 22 November, LNA started shelling Sabri and Suq al-Hout in preparation for a future offensive to retake the two districts. On 30 November, it launched an assault on Ganfouda, with tanks attacking from the west, while soldiers advanced across the whole perimeter and naval forces bombarded from offshore. It had captured about 90% of the district by this point and had destroyed the last tank of the Shura.

On 21 December 2016, an ISIL suicide bomber killed eight troops in fighting near Benghazi, media reports said.

=== Ganfouda and Bosnaib ===
On 5 January 2017, ISIL militants operating in Benghazi decided to flee the city after more than two years of clashes. There were conflicting reports about the reasons behind it. The Shura council said all the militants in Al-Sabri and Ganfouda districts were given a safe corridor by LNA to leave from the western gate of the city, while LNA claimed that the fighters had secretly escaped. The Shura council also stated that it had taken control of the districts and areas that were earlier under the group's control. Thirteen pro-LNA fighters were reportedly killed as the group withdrew, according to media sources. 2 ISIL fighters were also reportedly killed in the clashes, while another two were captured.

LNA stated on 6 January that the captured spokesman of the Shura Council confirmed that Wissam Ben Hamid, the leader of the pro-Shura groups, was killed in an airstrike in December 2016.

On 15 January 2017, Benghazi Shura Council fighters shot down a MiG 23 warplane of LNA. On 16 January 2017, pro-Haftar forces retook the Abu Sneib district in the city from Benghazi Shura Council militants after two days of fighting. A commanding officer stated that around 52 troops had died in fighting since 1 January in and around Benghazi. On 17 January, Fadel al-Hassi stated that LNA had captured the Bosnaib district.

LNA made gains around the Ganfouda district on 23 January. On 25 January 2017, LNA captured the Ganfouda district and stated that the remaining militants had fled to an area known as "12 Blocks". According to spokesman of LNA's Zawiya Martyrs' brigade, Wahid al-Zawi, the army was yet to secure the "12 Blocks" area which lies between Ganfouda and Bosnaib. A LNA commander told broadcaster Libya Channel that their forces had freed more than 60 people from captivity, following the fighting.

=== 12 Blocks siege ===
On 27 January 2017, the remnants of jihadists in the "12 Block" pocket were reported to have been defeated by the LNA. On 1 and 2 February 2017, 9 LNA soldiers were killed while clearing the "12 Blocks" area. The "12 Blocks" area was reported to have been fully secured on 2 February. However, clashes kept ongoing in the area despite the claims. BRSC announced on 21 February that one of its field commanders, Younis Al-Louhaishi, was killed in an airstrike. On 28 February it announced that Omer Ishkel, who is reported to be a former regime officer and Muammar Gaddafi's cousin, was killed in an airstrike on "12 Blocks". On 15 March, it stated that its commander Jalal Makhzum had been killed in 12 Blocks area during the clashes.

LNA captured the 12 Blocks complex on 18 March after an assault. The siege ended after the BRSC fighters attempted to escape. Milad al-Zwai, spokesman of LNA's special forces stated that 23 BRSC fighters were killed while six were arrested though some managed to escape along with civilians. In return, seven LNA soldiers were killed and six wounded. LNA also stated it lost a MiG-21 fighter jet over the Sabri district. It also detained and was investigating some of the civilians who had remained in the area after its capture.

=== Entering Al-Sabri and Souq al-Hoot ===
On 28 March, the LNA announced the beginning of the "final operation" to retake the remaining areas in central Benghazi that was still held by Shura Council militants. On 3 April, it was reported that the last Shura Council pocket in the Al-Sabri and Souq al-Hooq Districts had been heavily bombed by warplanes of LNA and ally nations. It was reported that the airstrikes caused the collapse of the Al-Lathamah Bridge in eastern Al-Sabri. On 3 May 2017, three civilians were killed and seven to 14 people were also wounded when a rocket hit a building in Shibna of Hay Dollar district. Meanwhile, four LNA engineers were killed when trying to defuse an explosive device when it detonated in Al-Sabri. On 9 May 2017, Riyadh al-Shahiebi, of the Saiqa special forces media office, said that 17 LNA troops were killed and that they had entered the Souq al-Hout and Sabri areas, but their advance has been slowed by roadside bombs. Another 55 LNA soldiers were also wounded. On the same day, LNA managed to recapture the National Library of Libya in Sabri district after heavy fighting with Islamic militants. At least 24 troops were killed and over 110 wounded during the previous 24 hours.

=== Final LNA push ===
On 19 June 2017, LNA soldiers were able to advance along Dernah, Al-Ageeb and Zuwara streets in Suq Al-Hout while also pushing militants out of the century-old Erkheis mosque.

On 23 June 2017, LNA announced that it had taken control of Souq al-Hout district. According to a medical official, at least 13 LNA soldiers were killed and 37 wounded during the past two days of fighting with many of those killed by landmines.

On 28 June 2017, the LNA took control of the Al-Thadi football club and surrounding buildings in Sabri during fighting, killing at least three LNA soldiers and injuring dozens. Field Marshal Haftar assigned Colonel Abdulmalik al-Awkali as the new military commander of Benghazi, while official reports that 44 soldiers were killed in fighting with the militants. LNA spokesman Khalifa al-Abidi stated that troops had made progress and the militants were besieged in an area of two square kilometres. On 4 July 2017, at least 17 LNA troops have died and 50 injured during the past 24 hours, according to a medical source. Meanwhile, LNA claimed that 19 militants were also killed in fighting and took control over important sites.

On 5 July 2017, LNA overran militants' position in Sabri district by retaking Gumhoriya Hospital and the unfinished Hyatt Regency hotel. Five LNA soldiers were killed, including Colonel Saleh Al-Rishi. Troops were meanwhile surrounding Sidi Akribesh area where the last holdout of the militants. Later in the evening, Field Marshal Khalifa Haftar declared that LNA forces had taken full control of the city from the Islamist militants.

Fighting in Benghazi continued two days after Haftar's declaration of victory, with 12 LNA men being killed and 35 wounded as it attempted to clear the last pockets of resistance in Sabri district. At least five militants were meanwhile killed and 11 arrested, while 10 prisoners held by them were freed according to LNA officials.

On 8 July, fighting with cornered militants continued with 18 LNA soldiers being killed during the day in mop-up operations. LNA claimed it killed Nasser Al-Tarshani, also known as Abu Khaled Al-Madani, a leader of Ansar al-Sharia. LNA spokesman Colonel Miloud Zwei stated on the next day that 20 LNA soldiers had been killed since the declaration of victory, while several militants were also killed and 17 arrested. He stated that the clashes were still ongoing in Souq al-Jarid. On 9 July, LNA stated it had managed to capture Sabri's Sidi Akribesh, the last militant positions after four days of fighting which left at least 22 LNA soldiers dead.

In an official statement after Haftar's declaration of victory, the Egyptian foreign ministry meanwhile praised LNA for its role, welcoming their victory as a "purge of terrorist and extremist organisations" in Benghazi. France's foreign ministry too welcomed LNA's victory while calling on Haftar to integrate a Libyan army under the authority of a civil power. GNA issued a statement congratulating the Benghazi residents for the victory. Thousands of Libyan civilians in many cities of the country celebrated after LNA's declaration of victory. In mid-July 2017, according to scholars from Benghazi University, an estimated 5 to 10 billion Libyan dinars are needed to rebuild Benghazi with the help from central government.

On 18 July 2017, the LNA admitted that 78 soldiers had been killed since the start of the month, including 21 soldiers which were killed by land mines and booby traps. It was also revealed that Sidi Akherbish had not been fully secured by the LNA, with two pockets of militants resuming to fight from Sabri's vegetable market and Al-Ruyaain hotel. A local hospital said six dead and 20 wounded soldiers had been brought in during the past four days.

=== Sidi Akribesh siege ===
On 22 July 2017, heavy fighting erupted in Bela Square. Two Ansar Al-Sharia leaders were believed to be holed up in the area, identified as Abdullah Buzgeia and Ahmed bin Shatwan. Meanwhile, Saiqa Special Forces spokesman Milad Al-Zwai said that the militants controlled an area of just 150 square metres and that after its capture the LNA's operation in Benghazi would end. Six LNA troops were killed while eight were injured in the clashes. Five days later, the militants in Sidi Akribesh were confined to one building, with most of them wearing suicide vests, according to a Saiqa Special Forces spokesman.

Ibrahim Bunuwara, who was said to earlier have been one of Ansar al-Sharia's top commanders in Sidi Akribesh, was captured, reportedly in Al-Khums.

Though the LNA's operational focus had shifted to Derna by August 2017, it was reported that some militants were still holding out in Sidi Akribesh. It was reported during the next month that a group of militants was still holding out in the area and inflicting casualties on the LNA. The LNA continued to insist that the surviving militants were confined to a few buildings. Meanwhile, the Jalaa Hospital was reported to have stated that four soldiers died, while 66 were injured in August.

In November 2017, LNA commanders abandoned their plan to starve out the remaining militants. Meanwhile, an LNA warplane launched airstrikes on the district for the first time in weeks. After that, the LNA advanced, but apparently met stiff resistance, with three soldiers killed and 12 wounded. One of the militants was also killed. On 9 November, one soldier and several Islamists were killed when LNA special forces advanced into Khreibish district, one of the remaining pockets of resistance. Ten soldiers were also wounded. Commander Wanis Bukhamada stated that his forces had captured almost the entire district after one day of fighting.

The LNA declared complete control of Sidi Akribesh according to a report on 11 November, with a warplane flying above to salute the soldiers. After the LNA's initial attacks were beaten back in August, Saiqa Special Forces had been called in to end the siege. However, Saiqa forces' spokesman Melod Zawi denied these reports as baseless, stating that military operations were still ongoing in Sidi Akribesh.

Dozens of militants remained holed up until late November in Sidi Akribesh despite Haftar's declaration of liberation in the summer, according to sources close to the military, who estimated the militants to be 90 in number. A military officer told Asharq Al-Awsat that the gunmen were using al-Baladi hotel as their main headquarters. While LNA claimed the militants to be ISIL, a mediator close to the armed groups stated they were Libya Shield 1. Zwai stated on 25 November that two LNA fighters were killed in clashes against Shura fighters, while three were also injured in clashes that broke out near Baladi hotel. Ten militants and seven soldiers were killed in November.

One person was killed and 10 injured in renewed clashes in Sidi Akribesh on 1 December. Zwai stated that they had advanced to the municipal hotel area and captured new locations. Another soldier was killed on 4 December, while three were wounded according to Zwai. He also added that they had found a supply dump used by the militants. By 7 December, a hospital in Benghazi had received five dead bodies and 12 wounded of LNA from battles with BRSC over the past three days. Medical sources meanwhile stated on 11 December that four LNA fighters had been killed and 10 others injured since the beginning of December.

Fresh clashes erupted between the two sides on 14 December in response to the killing of two soldiers by a sniper from Ansar al-Sharia, according to army officer Saeed Wanees. He added that the army's assault aimed at "ending the battle in Benghazi and completing the liberation announced months ago." By this time, nine soldiers had been killed in the battle since the beginning of December.

The LNA took over the last remaining militant stronghold of Sidi Akribesh on 28 December., with the military announceing that it had captured this last district of Benghazi from the Islamist fighters. Commander Wanis Bukhamada, head of army special forces, said LNA now fully controlled the district. They also stated they had captured the Baladi hotel and its surroundings. Al-Jalaa Hospital received 17 dead and 76 wounded LNA fighters in December 2017.

An LNA source stated on 29 December that three militants were killed in clashes. The source added that they were still besieging a number of terrorists in the area and the three who were killed were hiding in the rubble of the municipal hotel while the army was searching for fleeing militants. A military source stated on 30 December that all military operations had been concluded after securing the area and pursuing fleeing militants, killing five of them.

Mohammed Salalbi, senior leader of the Libya Martyrs' Brigade, stated that the remaining BRSC fighters had retreated from Benghazi and arrived in Derna on 29 December after misleading the LNA to make their way out. Merhi al-Houti of the LNA, meanwhile, denied that they had retreated, claiming that the army had blocked the road to areas controlled by them and had liberated the entire region from the "terrorist groups". He reiterated that clashes had ended.

== See also ==
- Battle of Aleppo (2012–2016)
- Battle of Sirte (2016)
- Battle of Mosul (2016–2017)
- Siege of Marawi
- Battle of Derna (2018–2019)
