= Brak al-Shati Airbase raid =

Part of the Second Libyan Civil War (2017)

- Part of the Second Libyan Civil War
Date	18 May 2017
Location	Brak al-Shati Airbase, Wadi al Shatii District
Result	Raid successful: BDB and Misratan militias raid base, destroying equipment and killing present soldiers; Ceasefire in Fezzan collapses; LNA launches counter-offensive

Belligerents
(Libya) Benghazi Defense Brigades (Libya) Government of National Accord (denied involvement)	(Libya) House of Representatives

Commanders and leaders
(Libya) Ahmed Abduljalil Al-Hasnawi (attack planner) (Libya) Jamal Al-Treiki (13th battalion commander)	(Libya) Gen. Mohamed Ben Nayel † (Libya) Ali Ibrahim Ben Nayel †

Units involved
13th Misrata Battalion: Brigade 201 Misratan militias	Libyan National Army: 10th Battalion; 12th Battalion

Casualties and losses
35	141 killed (including civilians)

On 18 May 2017, an attack was launched by militiamen of the town of Misrata and Benghazi Defense Brigades against the Brak al-Shati Airbase controlled by LNA forces. LNA sources claimed 141 people, including 103 soldiers and numerous civilians were killed as a result of the raid. The base was completely overrun and partially destroyed along with numerous aircraft at the base. Accusations of executions of surrendering forces led to international condemnation of GNA forces.

Shortly after, the LNA launched airstrikes on militant sites near the area in retaliation.

== Background ==
The GNA and LNA forces in Libya had reached an informal truce after meetings between GNA Prime Minister Fayez al-Sarraj and LNA Commander Khalifa Haftar. The attack came as a surprise to soldiers, who LNA claimed were participating in a military parade in the area before the attack.

== Response ==
Ahmad al-Mismari, an LNA spokesman in Benghazi claimed 141 deaths in the attack, including execution of civilians and surrendering airbase forces.

GNA Minister of Defense Al-Mahdi Al-Barghathi was suspended by Prime Minister al-Sarraj following allegations of his involvement in the attack. Barghathi denied involvement, stating that the ministry had never ordered the attack.

On 20 May, after gathering of tribal elders in city of Sebha, southern tribes gave Misrata 13th battalion (former 3rd Force) 72 hours to vacate their main base at Sabha Air Base, threatening to destroy militia forces inside otherwise. Tribal elders declared all agreements with Misrata forces void and held them fully responsible for the killings at Brak al-Shati.

In the days following the attack, Libyan National Army heavily bombarded Benghazi Defense Brigades bases in Jufra District and at Al Jufra Air Base where both 13th Misrata battalion and Benghazi Defense Brigades relocated to continue in the "Martyrs of Brak al-Shati operation". This ended the previous ceasefire, restarting the violence.

Presidency Council Vice-President Fathi Al-Mijabri described the attack as a war crime and declared Benghazi Defense Brigades as terrorists, calling it an act of sabotage aimed at ending attempts of national reconciliation between authorities in East and West that in previous weeks saw multiple meetings between both parties.

== International response ==
Human Rights Watch accused the 13th Battalion, officially falling under the authority of Government of National Accord, and Benghazi Defense Brigades militia of summary executions of both civilians and soldiers. 75 bodies that were received by local hospitals showed sign of execution by shot in the head, including two 15 year old boys. Attackers were shouting slogans of "You apostates, you enemies of God" as they were executing captured soldiers according to one survivor who has been interviewed by HRW.

Arab League decried the events as a "barbaric massacre". Egyptian ministry of foreign affairs declared the event as a terrorist attack. Envoys from China, France, Russia, United Kingdom and United States of America issued a joint statement in which they described summary executions of both military personnel and civilians.
