= Battle of Benghazi =

Battle of Benghazi may refer to:

- Battle of Benghazi (1911), part of the Italo-Turkish War, 1911-1912.
- First Battle of Benghazi, part of the First Libyan Civil War, 17–20 February 2011.
- Second Battle of Benghazi, part of the First Libyan Civil War, 19–20 March 2011.
- Third Battle of Benghazi, part of the Second Libyan Civil War, 16 May – 29 July 2014.
- Fourth Battle of Benghazi, part of the Second Libyan Civil War, 15 October 2014 – 30 December 2017.

== See also ==
- 2012 Benghazi attack, assault on a U.S. diplomatic mission
