= Siege of Derna =

- Part of the Libyan civil war (2014–2020)
| Date | August 2016 – 12 February 2019 |
| Location | Derna, Libya |
| Result | Libyan National Army victory |

Belligerents
| House of Representatives | Shura Council of Mujahideen in Derna | ISIL (limited involvement) |

Commanders and leaders
| Khalifa Haftar; Salem Rifadi; Adel Jehani (executed) | Ahmed Al-Habib †; Moaz Tashani | (Islamic State) Mohamed Fathi Al-Jamayel (executed) |

Casualties and losses
- 15 civilians killed, 17 civilians wounded

The siege of Derna was a military campaign by the Libyan National Army (LNA) to capture the city of Derna, which began after the end of the Derna campaign (2014–16). After besieging the city for 21 months, the LNA assaulted the city on 7 May 2018, beginning the 2018–2019 battle of Derna and ultimately capturing the city on 12 February 2019.

The siege itself was criticized by the National Commission for Human Rights in Libya as a war crime, as well as by the Government of National Accord.

== Timeline ==
The siege began in August 2016.

In August 2017–after militants of the Shura Council of Mujahideen in Derna executed Air Colonel Adel Jehani, whose plane was shot down by the group–the head of the Omar Mukhtar Operations Room tasked with taking Derna, Brigadier Salem Rifadi, declared a total blockade of Derna. He was quoted as saying that no food, medicine, cooking gas, petrol or anything else would be allowed in.

By September 2017, Marshal Khalifa Haftar was being accused of war crimes in the siege of Derna. It was alleged that Haftar had been complicit in calling for extrajudicial killings, arguing that Haftar had called on LNA fighters to take no prisoners, and saying in a speech: "Never mind consideration of bringing a prisoner here. There is no prison here. The field is the field, end of the story".

In October 2017, an airstrike hit Derna, killing at least 15 civilians, including women and children, and wounding 17 or more.

In December 2017, Islamic State member Mohamed Fathi Al-Jamayel was executed by the Shura Council after a failed attempt to kill senior member Moaz Tashani.

On 7 May 2018, the LNA launched an offensive on Derna, and by February 2019 had taken the city, thereby also ending the siege.

== See also ==
- Battle of Derna (disambiguation)
