= Libyan conflict =

Libyan conflict may refer to:

- Libyan crisis (2011–present)
- Libyan civil war (2011)
- Libyan civil war (2014–2020)
- Chadian–Libyan conflict
- Libyan–Sudanese conflict
- Libyan–Egyptian War

== See also ==
- List of wars involving Libya
