= Battle of Benina Airport =

- Part of Second Libyan Civil War
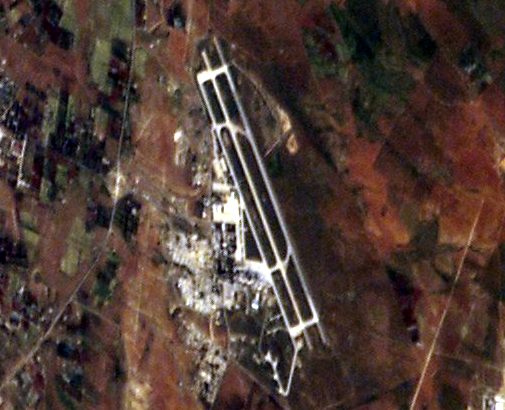
Date	1 August – 15 October 2014 (2 months and 2 weeks)
Location	Benina International Airport, Benghazi, in Libya
Result	Libyan National Army victory: Offensive on Benina Airport repelled by the Libyan National Army; Mohamed al-Zahawi, Leader of Ansar al-Sharia killed; Shura Council of Benghazi Revolutionaries forces pushed back towards the center of Benghazi; Emergence of Islamic State of Iraq and the Levant in Benghazi; Beginning of Battle of Benghazi (2014–2017)

Belligerents
(Libya) Libyan National Army	Shura Council of Benghazi Revolutionaries

Commanders and leaders
Gen. Khalifa Haftar (Commander of Operation Dignity); Col. Wanis Abu Khamada (Commander of Libya's Special Forces); Brig. Gen. Saqr Geroushi (Commander of the Libyan Air Force)	Mohamed al-Zahawi † (Ansar al-Sharia Leader); Wissam Ben Hamid (Libya Shield 1 Commander)

Strength
5,000+ soldiers	16,000+ fighters

Casualties and losses
82 soldiers killed	700+ fighters killed
- 20 civilians killed

The Battle of Benina Airport was a battle of the Second Libyan Civil War which lasted from August 2014 until October 2014 between the Islamic Shura Council of Benghazi Revolutionaries supported by extremist fundamental groups such as Ansar al-Sharia, who attempted to capture the airport, and the Libyan National Army led by General Khalifa Haftar.

== June–July 2014 ==
In June and July 2014, armed militants going by the name of Shura Council of Benghazi Revolutionaries began launching daily indiscriminate attacks on military bases and headquarters inside the city of Benghazi belonging to Libyan armed forces led by Khalifa Haftar, that later became known as the Libyan National Army, this forced the LNA to abandon all its headquarters and withdraw from the city. The LNA units managed to regroup their forces on the suburb district of Benina (15 km east of Benghazi) and took Benina Airport as its main headquarters for launching further operations and combating the militia groups inside Benghazi.

By the end of July 2014, forces of the Shura Council of Benghazi Revolutionaries fully took over the city of Benghazi from the Libyan National Army and Mohamed al-Zahawi, leader of Ansar al-Sharia and a commander of the Shura Council of Benghazi Revolutionaries declared Benghazi an "Islamic Emirate" and vowed to advance all his forces towards Benina and take Benina Airport from the Libyan National Army.

== August–October 2014 ==
On the beginning of August, the Shura Council of Benghazi Revolutionaries moved towards Benina and launched a full-scale offensive on Benina Airport in an attempt to capture it from the Libyan National Army. However, they were immediately pushed back to Sidi Faraj bridge after forces of the Libyan National Army outside the airport fired back with heavy weaponry and heavily bombarded their positions, causing them to pull back. On mid August The Libyan National Army carried out heavy airstrikes on Shura Council of Benghazi Revolutionaries forces positioned under Sidi Faraj bridge, killing hundreds of fighters. On beginning of September a suicide bomber managed to drive into the Libyan National Army under Benina bridge (few hundred meters away from the airport) and detonated, killing 12 soldiers and wounding others. After the suicide bombing the Shura Council of Benghazi Revolutionaries immediately attempted to advance to the airport once more, but failed again after soldiers positioned on Benina bridge and nearby buildings in the area began heavily firing on their positions, killing at least 60 fighters and forcing them to fall back to Sidi Faraj bridge. On the beginning of October the Libyan National Army began attacking Sidi Faraj bridge and the militia forces positioned there, heavy clashes took for a whole day and the Libyan National Army managed to take Sidi Faraj bridge, as a result of the operation, up to 150 militia fighters of the Shura Council of Benghazi Revolutionaries were killed, meanwhile the Libyan National Army lost 17 soldiers. As the forces of the Shura Council of Benghazi Revolutionaries began abandoning their positions near Benina Airport, the Libyan National Army began bombarding their last remaining pockets around the area with airstrikes just as the Shura Council of Benghazi Revolutionaries began to flee towards Benghazi, also killing their commander Mohamed al-Zahawi in the process. Despite many attempts by the Shura Council of Benghazi Revolutionaries to regroup and relaunch the attack on the airport again, all their attempts resulted in failure. By mid October the Shura Council of Benghazi Revolutionaries suffered a significant death toll among their ranks, including Mohamed al-Zahawi. This left their fighters leaderless in the middle of the battle and in a state of vacuum and disorder amongst their commanders and fighters. After learning of Zahawi's death, the Libyan National Army took advantage by launching heavier attacks on the Shura Council of Benghazi Revolutionaries killing hundreds more fighters, forcing the Shura Council of Benghazi Revolutionaries to fully abandon all their positions outside Benina and withdraw to the center of Benghazi. By 15 October the Libyan National Army advanced and managed to push back the Shura Council of Benghazi Revolutionaries to the center of the city of Benghazi, resulting in the beginning of the Battle of Benghazi (2015).
