= Libya Shield Force =

Islamist armed group

- قوة درع ليبيا
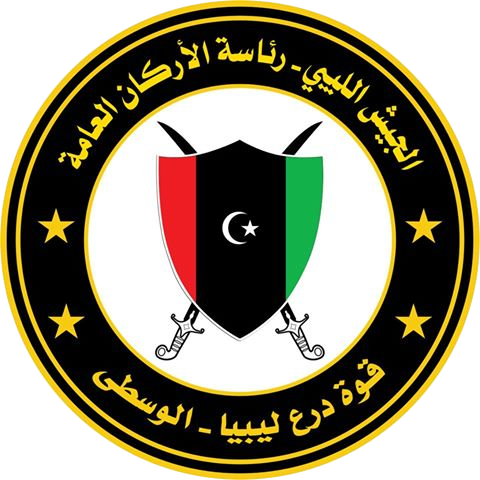
- Dates active: 2012–present
- Ideology: Islamism; Islamic fundamentalism

The Libya Shield Force is an armed organisation formed in 2012 out of anti-Gaddafi armed groups spread throughout Libya. The Libyan parliament designated much of the Libya Shield Force as terrorist and elements of the Libya Shield Force were identified as linked to al-Qaeda as early as 2012.

Since the outbreak of the Second Libyan Civil War, the Libya Shield Force has been associated with the Islamic fundamentalist side. In 2019, it reportedly aided the Government of National Accord in defending Tripoli from an LNA offensive.

== Branches ==
The major branches of the Libya Shield Force fighting for Islamists in the current conflict are:

- Libya Shield 1, now part of the Shura Council of Benghazi Revolutionaries which is designated "terrorist" by the House of Representatives
- Another Benghazi unit, Shield 2, is considered more sympathetic to the federalists. The force reports to the Libyan defense ministry under the command of Wisam Bin Ahmid (or Humid), who commanded a Benghazi brigade called Free Libya Martyrs.
- The Western Shield, serving the General National Congress. The Western Shield is involved in fighting to the south and west of Tripoli. It is linked to Al-Qaida leader Abd al-Muhsin Al-Libi, also known as Ibrahim Ali Abu Bakr or Ibrahim Tantoush (not to be confused with Abu Anas al Libi).
- The Central Shield, serving the General National Congress. The Central Shield was heavily involved in the fighting to capture Tripoli International Airport. Due to the large number of Misratans, the Central Shield is often identified as Misrata brigades. Officially designated as "terrorists" by the Libyan House of Representatives.

=== Creation ===
The Libyan Ministry of Defense, under decision No. 29, formed and named Libya Shield Forces on March 8, 2012. Decision No. 29 states, "A brigade shall be formed in the Central Region of Libya and is to be called Libya Shield – The forces of the Central Brigade shall consist, in general, of rebels from the following regions, Misrata, Sirte, Jafra, Bani Walid, Terhuna, Alkhmuss, Mslath and Zliten. Colonel Mohammed Ibrahim Moussa shall be the commander of the brigade and shall be stationed in Misrata." This decision was signed by the Minister of Defense, Osama Abdulsalam Aljuli. Thus, the name Libya Shield Forces was first coined by the Libyan Minister of Defense.

== Attacks ==
The group began its armed activity in 2012, it was not until the following year that they increased their armed activity. On April 14, 2014, assailants opened fire on the convoy of Fawaz al-Etan, Jordanian ambassador to Libya, in the Mansour neighborhood of the city of Tripoli, Tripoli district. Al-Etan, the Jordanian ambassador, was kidnapped and his driver was injured in the attack. Al-Etan was released on May 13, 2014. No group claimed responsibility for the incident; however, sources attributed the kidnapping to the Libyan Shield Force.

In July 13, members of the Zintan Militia members stationed at Tripoli International Airport were attacked, killing six people were killed and 25 others were wounded result of the subsequent clashes. Days later, two suicide bombers detonated explosive-laden vehicles at an Al-Saiqa Special Forces base in the city of Benghazi. The first bomber detonated at the base entrance, allowing the second bomber to detonate his explosives inside the base immediately after the first explosion. In addition to the two attackers, six members of the Saiqa Forces were killed and two others injured in the attack. No group claimed responsibility for the incident; however, sources attributed the attack to Ansar al-Sharia (Libya) and the Libyan Shield 1.

On August 1, an explosive charge detonated near a police building in Benghazi, leaving only property damage, days later another similar attack would be recorded in Benghazi, also causing material damage. In the days that followed, attacks would continue, which some sources would point out were the work of the Libyan Shield Force. Two suicide bombers detonated explosive-laden cars at a Haftar militia checkpoint near the airport in the city of Benghazi. In addition to the attackers, more than 10 soldiers were killed and 52 others injured by the blast. This was one of two coordinated attacks against the militia in the area that day. The Shura Council of Benghazi Revolutionaries claimed responsibility for the incident in coordination with the Ansar al Sharia and the Libyan Shield Forces.
