= Ateyah Al-Shaari =

Libyan rebel leader

- عطية سعد الشاعري
- Ateyah Al-Shaari in 2018.

Leader of the Derna Protection Force
- In office 11 May 2018 – 12 February 2019
- Preceded by: Position established
- Succeeded by: Unknown

Personal details
- Died: 2019 (Unconfirmed) Derna, Libya (Unconfirmed)

Military service
- Battles/wars: Second Libyan Civil War: Battle of Derna (2018–2019)

Ateyah Al-Shaari (fl. 2019; Arabic: عطية سعد الشاعري) is or was a Libyan rebel leader of the Shura Council of Mujahideen in Derna, which he dissolved into the Derna Protection Force on 11 May 2018, during the Libyan National Army's offensive on Derna. On 26 June, Agenzia Nova reported that Ateyah had been killed in a shootout with LNA forces the preceding day, but Libyan National Army spokesman Ahmed al-Mismari was unable to confirm this.
