= The Higher Institute of Computer Technology =

Higher education in Tripoli, Libya

College of Computer Technology Tripoli - CCTT
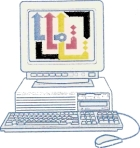
- The Emblem of the University
- Type: Public
- Established: 1990
- President: Prof. Agil M Agil
- Location: Tripoli, Libya
- Website: http://www.cctt.edu.ly/

College of Computer Technology Tripoli (Arabic: كلية تقنية الحاسوب طرابلس) sometimes abbreviated as CCTT is a government sponsored leading institute of higher education in Tripoli, Libya. Founded in 1990, College of Computer Technology Tripoli began with an emphasis on the computer science, programming, networking and automated control.

CCTT is known by its discipline and strict admission requirements. To be accepted in the institute, one need to take qualifying courses and set for entrance exams. The institute alumni have good reputation in the local technology market and research institutions and some of them holds sensitive positions in the government.

== Programs of Study ==
The college offers four years B.SC degree in the following fields:

- Department of (Hardware and Maintenance):
  - Computer Networks.
  - Automated Control Engineering.
  - Computer Engineering and Maintenance.
- Department of (Computer Science and IT):
  - Software Development.
- Department of Training Courses.
  - IT and Maintenance Courses.
  - Control Courses.
  - Systems administration Courses.
  - Networking Courses.

Around 1000 students studying at the Institute every year and the number is increasing every year.

== Academics ==
The institute offers a bachelor's degree in computer and software engineering, programming, networks and automated control. Which will be taken in four years of full-time study and final graduation project.

== Scholarships ==
The Institute is sponsored by the government so all tuition fees are paid by the government and there are very few positions for student every year especially foreign students.

== Research and Industry Corporations ==
Even though the research infrastructure in Libya is not very good-due to several causes like the embargo and lack of qualified researchers- the institute students have done outstanding graduation projects in robotics, control systems and networking, those project have got local and international awards.
