= Derna Protection Force =

Libyan militia

- قوة حماية درنة
- Leader: Ateyah Al-Shaari
- Spokesperson: Mohammed Al-Mansouri †
- Dates active: 11 May 2018 – 12 February 2019
- Active regions: Derna, Libya
- Ideology: Islamic extremism
- Size: 50–60 (HOR estimate, 14 June 2018); 46 (12 February 2019)
- Wars: the Second Libyan Civil War

The Derna Protection Force (DPF; Arabic: قوة حماية درنة), also known as the Derna Security Force, was a Libyan militia formed by Ateyah Al-Shaari on 11 May 2018, during the Libyan National Army (LNA) assault on Derna.

== History ==
The militia was founded on 11 May 2018 by Ateyah Al-Shaari, the leader of the Shura Council of Mujahideen in Derna.

Despite losing control of Derna on 28 June 2018, the Derna Protection Force survived the LNA assault. In July and September they clashed with the LNA. Despite these clashes, it had been commented in October 2018 that after "losing fighters, leadership and control of the city", the DPF had effectively "ceased to exist as an organization".

On 12 February 2019, the 46 remaining DPF fighters surrendered to the LNA, ending the DPF existence.

The LNA blamed 2 improvised explosive devices attacks in Derna on 2 June 2019 on the DPF, despite the group being defunct. On the following day, the attack was claimed by the Islamic State.
