= Abu Sufian bin Qumu =

Guantanamo Bay detainee (born 1959)

Abu Sufian Ibrahim Ahmed Hamuda Bin Qumu
- Born: 26 June 1959 (age 67); Derna, Libya
- Detained at: Guantanamo
- Other names: Arabic: أبو سفيان إبراهيم أحمد حمودة بن قمو; Soufian bin Qamou
- ISN: 557
- Charge: No charge (held in extrajudicial detention)
- Status: Repatriated to Libyan custody; allegedly became a rebel commander in the Libyan civil war, allegedly founded a branch of the Islamist Ansar al-Sharia group

Abu Sufian Ibrahim Ahmed Hamuda Bin Qumu (Arabic: أبو سفيان إبراهيم أحمد حمودة بن قمو, born 26 June 1959) is a citizen of Libya who was held in extrajudicial detention in the United States Guantanamo Bay detention camps, in Cuba. Joint Task Force Guantanamo counter-terrorism analysts report he was born on 26 June 1959, in Derna, Libya.

Bin Qumu was transferred to Libya on 28 September 2007. In 2011, he was the leader of a band of fighters in his hometown of Derna during the 2011 Libyan civil war. After the war, he led the militant Islamist group Ansar al-Sharia's Derna branch.

== Prior history ==
A disclosed file from 2005 on WikiLeaks alleged that he served as a tank driver in the Libyan army. He later allegedly traveled to Afghanistan and trained in Bin Laden's Torkham Camp. After fighting the Soviets in Afghanistan, he allegedly worked as a truck driver for Wadi Al-'Aqiq, one of Bin Laden's companies in Suba, Sudan. He later joined the Libyan Islamic Fighting Group, joined the Taliban in 1998, and he was a "probable member of Al Qaida and a member of the African Extremist Network."

== Repatriation and release ==
Bin Qumu was reported to have been released in October 2007. He was transferred to Libya on 28 September 2007 and was released from Abu Salim prison in 2010 following an amnesty for political prisoners.

== Libyan Civil War ==
Abu Sufian bin Qumu
- Born: 26 June 1959 (age 67); Derna, Libya
- Military career
- Allegiance: (Libya) National Transitional Council (2011–)
- Branch: National Liberation Army
- Conflicts: 2011 Libyan civil war

In 2011, Bin Qumu became the leader of a band of fighters in his hometown of Derna called Ansar al-Sharia during the 2011 Libyan civil war.

It was reported that Bin Qumu was possibly involved with, and may have led, the 11 September 2012 attack on the US Consulate in Benghazi, Libya, in which four US Diplomats were killed including US Ambassador Chris Stevens. A US national security official subsequently stated to Mother Jones: "[the] report is wrong, there's no intelligence suggesting that he was leading the attack on the consulate that evening." However, other US officials have since confirmed that Bin Qumu was likely present and played a role in the attack.

On 10 January 2014, the U.S. Department of State listed Bin Qumu as a Specially Designated Global Terrorist.

On 17 June 2018, Al Arabiya reported that bin Qumu was taken into custody when the Libyan Army captured the last stronghold of Ansar al-Sharia, in Derna. They reported he had not played a prominent role in the organization.
