= Ansar al-Sharia (Derna) =

Ansar Al-Sharia (Derna, Libya)
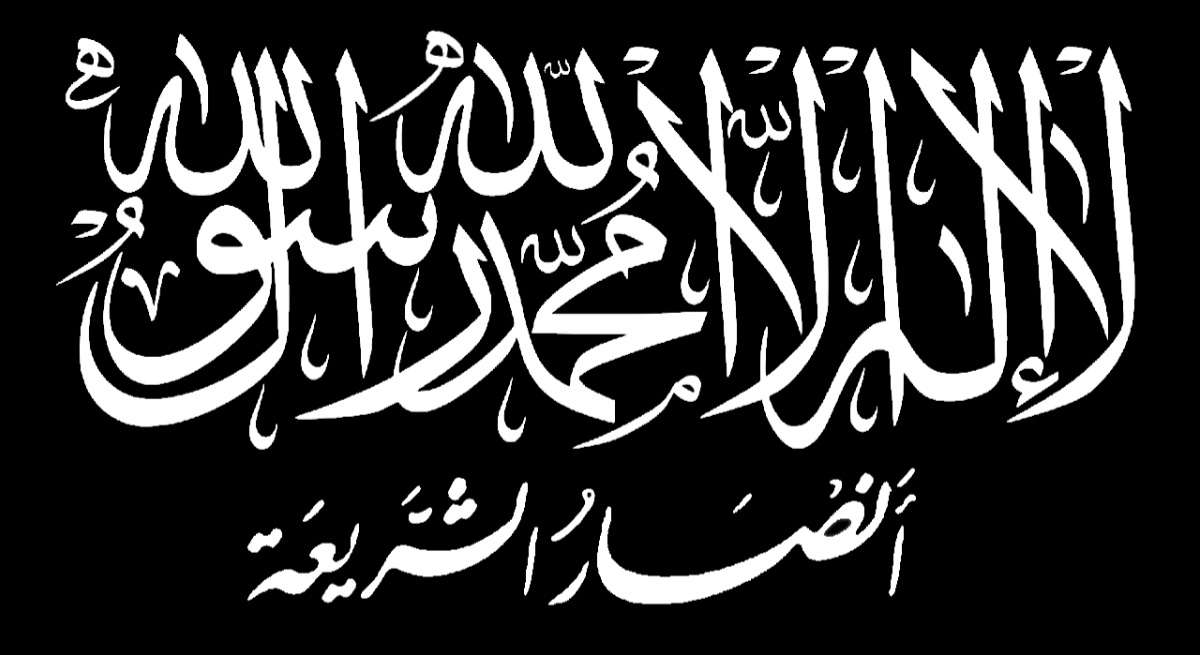
- The flag of the group
- Leader: Abu Sufian bin Qumu (POW)
- Dates active: 2011–2018
- Active regions: Eastern Libya (Cirenaica)
- Part of: Ansar al-Sharia (Libya); Shura Council of Mujahideen in Derna
- Wars: Libyan Civil War

Ansar al-Sharia is the Derna based branch of a larger Libyan group; the branch is headed by Abu Sufian bin Qumu. In 2011 bin Qumu became the leader of a band of fighters in his hometown of Derna during the 2011 Libyan civil war. The group was reported as disbanding itself following the U.S. Consulate attack in Benghazi however by late 2013 the group had re-emerged in the city as a branch of the Benghazi-based Ansar al-Sharia under the slogan "A step toward building the Islamic state".

In December 2014, Ansar al-Sharia joined the Abu Salim Martyrs Brigade and Jaysh al-Islami al-Libi in an umbrella organisation called the Majlis Shura al-Mujahidin Derna (Derna Mujahidin Consultative Council). The group has been involved in fighting with the forces of General Khalifa Haftar in the Second Libyan Civil War.

Ansar al-Sharia and the Majlis Shura al-Mujahidin Derna have opposed the Islamic State of Iraq and the Levant presence in Derna.

== See also ==
- Ansar al-Sharia (Libya)
