= Ajdabiya Revolutionaries Shura Council =

Militant group (possibly a terrorist group) in the Second Libyan Civil War

- Flag used by members of the Ajdabiya Shura Council
- Leader: Ibreik Maziq al-Zway
- Dates active: 25 March 2015 – 21 February 2016 (10 months, 3 weeks and 6 days)
- Allegiance: Islamic State (Alleged, Denied)
- Active regions: Ajdabiya
- Ideology: Islamism; Jihadism
- Wars: the Second Libyan Civil War

The Ajdabiya Revolutionaries Shura Council was a Libyan armed coalition active in the city of Ajdabiya. It was declared on 25 March 2015. The group opposed the Libyan National Army (LNA), led by Khalifa Haftar, during the Second Libyan Civil War.

On 15 December 2015, the LNA launched a military offensive in Ajdabiya despite objections from the city's mayor, initiating clashes with the Shura Council and its allies. The fighting ended with the defeat of the Council on 21 February 2016.

The Council denied any ties to the Islamic State, despite using a black flag with inverted colors resembling the flag of ISIS.
