= Libyan Presidential Guard =

- الحرس الرئاسي الليبي
- Active: May 2016
- Country: Libya
- Allegiance: Presidential Council
- Branch: Libyan Armed Forces
- Type: Presidential Guard
- Role: Presidential, VIP & strategic facilities protection
- Garrison/HQ: Tripoli
- Anniversaries: 9 Mei
- Website: https://pgl.gov.ly/

Commanders
- Current commander: Major General Dhiya-Aldeen al-Amrouni

The Libyan Presidential Guard was established in May 2016 by the internationally recognised Government of National Accord to protect politicians, government buildings, and other "sensitive sites including maritime, air and land borders, the sources and supply of water and electricity power plants." The Presidential Guard is intended to be a politically neutral force unaffiliated with any of the factions in the civil war. In June 2017, it was reported that the Guard had 4,000 recruits in Tripoli on different assignments.

Members of the Presidential Guard were allegedly involved in a corruption scandal.

Commanders:

- Major General Najmi al-Nakua (1 September 2016 – 24 October 2018)
- Major General Dhiya-Aldeen al-Amrouni (24 October 2018 – present)

== Structure ==
- mechanized infantry brigade
  - combat units
  - technical units
  - security battalion
- Special Tasks Unit
- Omar Al-Mukhtar Training Center
- Honor Guard
- Department of International Relations and Cooperation
  - Media Section
