= Rafallah al-Sahati Brigade =

- كتيبة راف الله السحاتي
- Active regions: Eastern Libya: Kufra
- Ideology: Islamism
- Size: ~1,000
- Part of: Shura Council of Benghazi Revolutionaries
- Wars: the Libyan Civil War, Post-civil war violence in Libya, and the 2014 Libyan Conflict

The Rafallah Sahati Brigade is named after one of the first Libyans to die while fighting Gaddafi's forces in March 2011 in Benghazi. The group began as a battalion of the 17 February Martyrs brigade, before expanding to become a group in its own right. Its members are estimated at 1,000 with presence in eastern Libya and in Kufra. The brigade took part in securing the national elections and other Ministry of Defence operations in eastern Libya. It has denounced the killing of the US ambassador in Benghazi.
