= Al Jufra Airbase =

Al Jufra Airbase Al Jufra Airbase
- IATA: none; ICAO: HL69

Summary
- Airport type: Military
- Operator: Libyan Air Force
- Serves: Aljufra , Libya
- Elevation AMSL: 846 ft / 258 m
- Coordinates: 29°11′53″N 16°00′04″E

Map
- Location of the airport in Libya

Runways
Direction	Length		Surface
Direction	m	ft	Surface
14/32	3,805	12,484	Concrete
- Source: GCM Google Maps

Al Jufra Airbase (ICAO: HL69) is a Libyan Air Force base in Al Jufra , 9 kilometres (5.6 mi) northwest of Waddan. It was originally used by the Libyan Arab Air Force during the Gaddafi-era from 1969 to 2011.

The runway length does not include 198 metres (650 ft) paved overruns on each end.

== History ==
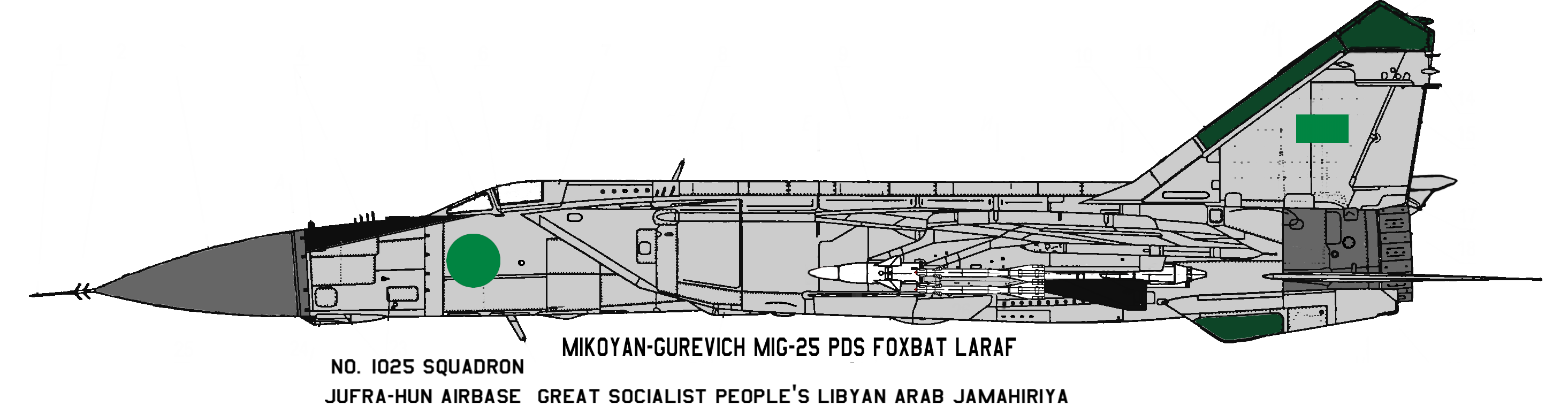
The Mikoyan-Gurevich Mig-25 PDS Foxbat Based at Al Jufra Airbase.

Prior to the First Libyan Civil War, during the 1980s, the No. 1025 Squadron operated Mig-25PDs at the Al Jufra-Hun Airbase for defense of the north coast. TU-22, G.222, and An-26 were based at Jufra, parked on open pavement, sand berm shielded pads, and in aircraft shelters. Considering the positioning of many of the aircraft visible in the satellite imagery, and what is known of the maintenance record of the Libyan Air Force, the operational inventory of combat aircraft based at Jufra in 2011 can be assumed to be quite low. The G.222 is believed to have not flown for more than a decade.

== No-Fly Zone enforcement ==
The airbase was bombed on 24 March 2011 by French aircraft, in accordance with the UN-backed enforcement of the No-Fly Zone over Libya. Over two and a half months later, on 13 June, the area was again struck by NATO forces.

== See also ==
- Transport in Libya
- List of airports in Libya
