= Shura Council of Mujahideen in Derna =

Former Libyan Islamic militia coalition

- مجلس شورى مجاهدين درنة
- Leaders: Salim Derby (unknown–2015) †; Yusuf Bin Tahir; Nasser Akr †; Ateyah Al-Shaari (unknown–2018)
- Dates active: 12 December 2014 – 11 May 2018 (3 years, 5 months, 4 weeks and 2 days)
- Groups: Ansar al-Sharia; Jaysh al-Islam; Abu Salim Martyrs Brigade (dissolved in 2015)
- Active regions: Derna
- Ideology: Islamism; Jihadism
- Wars: the Second Libyan Civil War

The Shura Council of Mujahideen in Derna (Arabic: مجلس شورى مجاهدين درنة) was a coalition of Islamist militias that advocated the implementation of Sharia law within Derna, Libya. Besides seeking to implement strict social mores in Derna, the alliance was known for its open opposition to Khalifa Haftar and the Libyan affiliates of the Islamic State (IS).

On 11 May 2018, the Shura Council was dissolved as result of reversals during the Battle of Derna, and replaced by the Derna Protection Force.

== Background ==
The Shura Council of Mujahideen in Derna was created by former Libyan Islamic Fighting Group member Salim Derby on 12 December 2014. The group frequently clashed with IS in Derna in disputes over power and resources in the city. In June 2015, IS gunmen killed senior Shura Council leader Nasser Akr. The group responded by declaring a Jihad against IS. Salim Derby was killed on 11 June 2015, as a result of the ensuing clashes.

The Shura Council was known to have close ties to the militant Egyptian al-Mourabitoun network of Hesham Ashmawy.

== Members ==
At its founding, the council included the following groups:

- Ansar al-Sharia
- Abu Salim Martyrs Brigade
- Jaysh al-Islam
