= Saqr Geroushi =

Libyan military officer

Lieutenant General Saqar Adam Geroushi
- صقر ادم الجروشي
- Military career
- Allegiance: Libyan Arab Jamahiriyah (until 2011); Libya (HoR) (since 2011)
- Branch: Libyan Air Force
- Rank: Lieutenant General
- Commands: Chief of Staff of the Libyan Air Force; Inspector General of the Libyan Armed Forces
- Conflicts: First Libyan Civil War; Second Libyan Civil War

Saqr Adam Geroushi (Arabic: صقر ادم الجروشي) is a Libyan military officer who is the Chief of Staff of the Libyan Air Force that supports Marshal Khalifa Haftar's Libyan National Army faction. Geroushi was reinstated as the head of the Libyan Air Force in January 2015. In March 2017, it was reported that Geroushi had suffered a heart attack and was in intensive care at a hospital. As of 2020, Geroushi is still the head of the pro-LNA air force and took part in the 2019–20 Western Libya campaign.

In 2021, Marshal Haftar appointed Lieutenant General Geroushi as the Inspector General of the Libyan National Army, succeeding Major General Abduljalil Al-Tarhouni.
