= February 17th Martyrs Brigade =

Islamist militia in Libya

- كتيبة شهداء 17 فبراير
- Logo of the February 17th Martyrs Brigade
- Ideology: Islamism
- Size: 1,500–3,500
- Part of: Shura Council of Benghazi Revolutionaries

The February 17th Martyrs Brigade is a Libyan armed rebel group that was active in Libya during the First and Second Libyan civil wars and was founded by members of the Muslim Brotherhood.

Their name refers to the 'Day of Rage' protests on February 17, 2011 against the former leader of Libya Muammar Gaddafi–during the Arab Spring–that were met by harsh military suppression and triggered the First Libyan Civil War.

== Composition ==
In 2015, the brigade consisted of 12 battalions and possessed a large collection of light and heavy weapons in addition to training facilities. Its membership was estimated at between 1,500 and 3,500.

== Activities ==
The February 17th Martyrs Brigade was called on for assistance by the US government during the 2012 Benghazi attack. Despite their call, the agency did not count on the help of the militia, which did not report on the advance of the initial mob that attacked the embassy. The militia adopted the roles of the Libyan state during the attack. Some CIA analysts called it "a mistake" to have trusted an irregular militia which had already stopped patrolling with Western troops in protest against low pay and long working hours, where the security of the American officers was quite poor. In an interview with the Los Angeles Times in October, 2012, two members of the militia told their story and account of the events, due to the FBI investigating and raising questions about their role in the attacks. The FBI insinuated that because the militiamen were not prepared to fight to the death, it brought into question their possible collaboration with the attackers. The two men deny any support of the assailants but also acknowledge that within their ranks, there could have been some anti-American elements.

Following the attack, together with the Bou Salim Martyrs brigade, the February 17th Martyr Brigades allegedly agreed to disband; however, only 150 to 200 militiamen moved from Benghazi to Jebel Akhdar.

In 2014, the militia carried out mortar attacks against some neighborhoods in Benghazi. On 17 October, the group claimed a suicide car bombing against a checkpoint of a non-governmental militia in Benghazi, killing four people (in addition to the attacker) and wounding one more.

In 2015, the brigade was considered to be the largest and best armed militia in eastern Libya. It was financed by the Libyan Defense Ministry. The group continues to carry out "security and law and order" tasks in eastern Libya and the southern region of Kufra.

The 17th February Brigade was featured in the 2016 action movie 13 Hours: The Secret Soldiers of Benghazi.
