= Libya Shield 1 =

Libyan islamist battalion

- درع ليبيا 1
- Leader: Wissam Ben Hamid †
- Dates active: 3 August 2012 - December 2016
- Headquarters: Ganfouda, Benghazi (until June 2015)
- Ideology: Islamism
- Part of: Shura Council of Benghazi Revolutionaries
- Wars: the Post-civil war violence in Libya and the Second Libyan Civil War

Libya Shield 1 was an Islamist armed group in Benghazi and eastern Libya. It is nominally part of the Libya Shield Force and is a member of the Shura Council of Benghazi Revolutionaries.

== History ==
The Libyan Ministry of Defense, under decision No. 29, formed and named Libya Shield Forces on 3 August 2012. Decision No. 29 states, "A brigade shall be formed in the Central Region of Libya and is to be called Libya Shield – The forces of the Central Brigade shall consist, in general, of rebels from the following regions, Misrata, Sirte, Jafra, Bani Walid, Terhuna, Alkhmuss, Mslath and Zliten. Colonel Mohammed Ibrahim Moussa shall be the commander of the brigade and shall be stationed in Misrata." This decision was signed by the Libya Minister of Defense, Osama Abdulsalam Aljuli bearing the name Libya Shield Forces.

== Organization ==
The Libya Shield Force is nominally divided into three main brigades in eastern, central and western Libya to carry out law and order and combat tasks. Libya Shield 1 was part of the Eastern region of the force.

On social media, reactions to the group are favourable across Libya in comparison to other militias, particularly over its charitable work.

Another Benghazi unit, Shield 2, is considered more sympathetic to the federalists. The force reports to the Libyan defense ministry under the command of Wisam Bin Ahmid (or Humid), who commanded a Benghazi brigade called Free Libya Martyrs.
