= Shura Council of Benghazi Revolutionaries =

Former military coalition in Benghazi, Libya

- مجلس شورى ثوار بنغازي
- Leaders: Mohamed al-Zahawi †; Ismail Muhammad al-Salabi; Mustafa al-Sharksi
- Dates active: 20 June 2014 – 29 December 2017
- Headquarters: Benghazi, Libya
- Ideology: Islamism
- Size: ~ 5,000
- Wars: Factional violence in Libya (2011–2014); Second Libyan Civil War

The Shura Council of Benghazi Revolutionaries (Arabic: مجلس شورى ثوار بنغازي, Majlis Shura Thuwar Benghazi) was a military coalition in Benghazi, Libya, composed of Islamist and jihadist militias, including Ansar al-Sharia, Libya Shield 1, and several other groups.

== History ==
The force was initially formed in June 2014, in response both to the anti-Islamist Operation Dignity being led by Khalifa Haftar, and also the defeat of Islamist candidates in the 2014 Council of Deputies election. Afraid of being sidelined and defeated, several Islamist brigades united under a shared umbrella. The consolidation and restructuring allowed the Islamist brigades to limit the success of Haftar's Operation Dignity, before allowing the Islamist groups to push back against the outnumbered forces allied to Haftar.

On 14 July 2014, the council claimed it had taken over Barrack 319, which is one of the largest army barracks in eastern Libya. In late July, they took control of more than five other barracks in Benghazi, including the headquarters of the Al-Saiqa Special Forces unit. On 31 July 2014, the council claimed to have had taken over Benghazi. However it lost control of much of the city to the Libyan National Army in the following months.

Mohammed Salalbi, senior leader of Libya Martyrs' Brigade, stated that the remaining SCBR fighters had retreated from Benghazi and arrived in Derna on 29 December 2017, after misleading the LNA to make their way out. Merhi al-Houti of LNA meanwhile denied that they had retreated, claiming that the army had blocked the road to areas controlled by them and had liberated the entire region from the "terrorist groups". He added that clashes had ended.

== Members ==
As of August 2014, the council was composed of the following groups, among others:

- Ansar al-Sharia (2014–2017)
- Libya Shield 1 (2014–2017)
- February 17th Martyrs Brigade (2014–2017)
- Rafallah al-Sahati Brigade (2014–2017)
- Jaysh al-Mujahidin (2014–2017)
- Brega Martyrs Brigade (2014–2017)

== Benghazi Defense Brigades ==
Formed in June 2016 to take control of Bengazi and protect the Shura Council from the Libyan National Army, the Benghazi Defence Brigades (BDB) included various Libya Dawn militias and was organized under the banner of Saddiq Al-Ghariyani. It pledged to support the Government of National Accord (GNA). The GNA members are ambivalent about the BDB with some calling for it to be demarcated as a "terrorist organization". It certainly has links with the jihadist militias, and is apparently opposed to the Presidential Council of the GNA, while at the same time working under Mahdi Al-Barghathi, the Defence Minister of the GNA.

Primarily the Benghazi Defence Brigades (BDB) were involved with the defense of Benghazi against both ISIS and the Libyan National Army (LNA), where they lost to the LNA. They were also involved in the 2016 offensive against ISIL's stronghold in Sirte, and occupied Ben Jawad and Nufliya on behalf of the GNA, but they withdrew when the LNA advanced into those towns. The BDB were apparently responsible for shooting down a French helicopter that the GNA said was violating Libyan sovereignty. The French denied retaliating with airstrikes against the BDB.

The BDB was headquartered at Al Jufra Air Base, along with other GNA forces, and were attacked there by the LNA in December 2016.
