= Ansar al-Sharia (Libya) =

Salafist jihadist group in Libya

Ansar al-Sharia in Libya
- أنصار الشريعة بليبيا
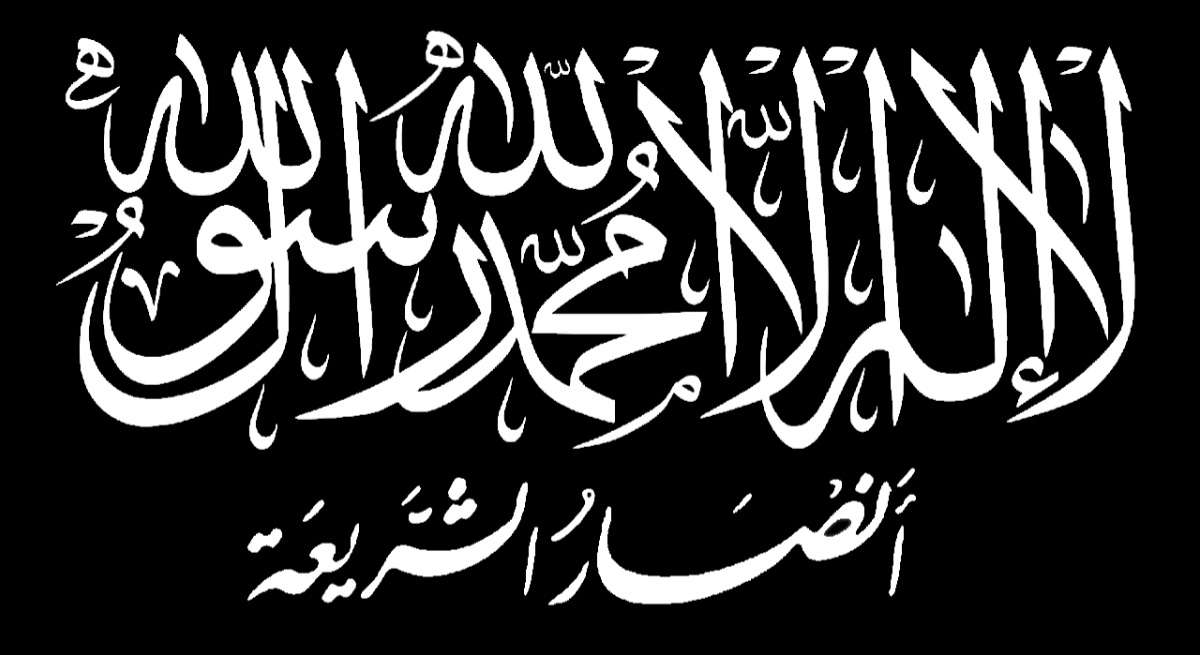
- Leaders: Abu Khalid al Madani; Mohamed al-Zahawi †
- Dates active: June 2012 – 27 May 2017
- Group: Ansar al-Sharia (Derna)
- Active regions: Benghazi; Other cities in Eastern Libya
- Ideology: Islamism; Salafi jihadism Anti-Gaddafism
- Size: 4,500–5,000+
- Part of: Al-Qaeda; Shura Council of Benghazi Revolutionaries; Ajdabiya Shura Council
- Wars: the Factional violence in Libya (2011–14) and the Second Libyan Civil War

Ansar al-Sharia in Libya (ASL, Arabic: أنصار الشريعة بليبيا, lit. 'Supporters of Sharia') was an Al-Qaeda-aligned Salafi Jihadist militia group that advocated the implementation of Sharia across Libya. Ansar al-Sharia came into being in 2011, during the Libyan Civil War. Until January 2015, it was led by its "Amir", Muhammad al-Zahawi. As part of its strategy, the organization targeted specific Libyan and American civilians for death and took part in the 2012 Benghazi attack. The group was designated as a terrorist organization by the United Nations, Iraq, Turkey, the United Arab Emirates, the United Kingdom and the United States.

On 27 May 2017, the group announced it was formally dissolving itself, amid heavy losses that killed most of its leadership and decimated its fighters.

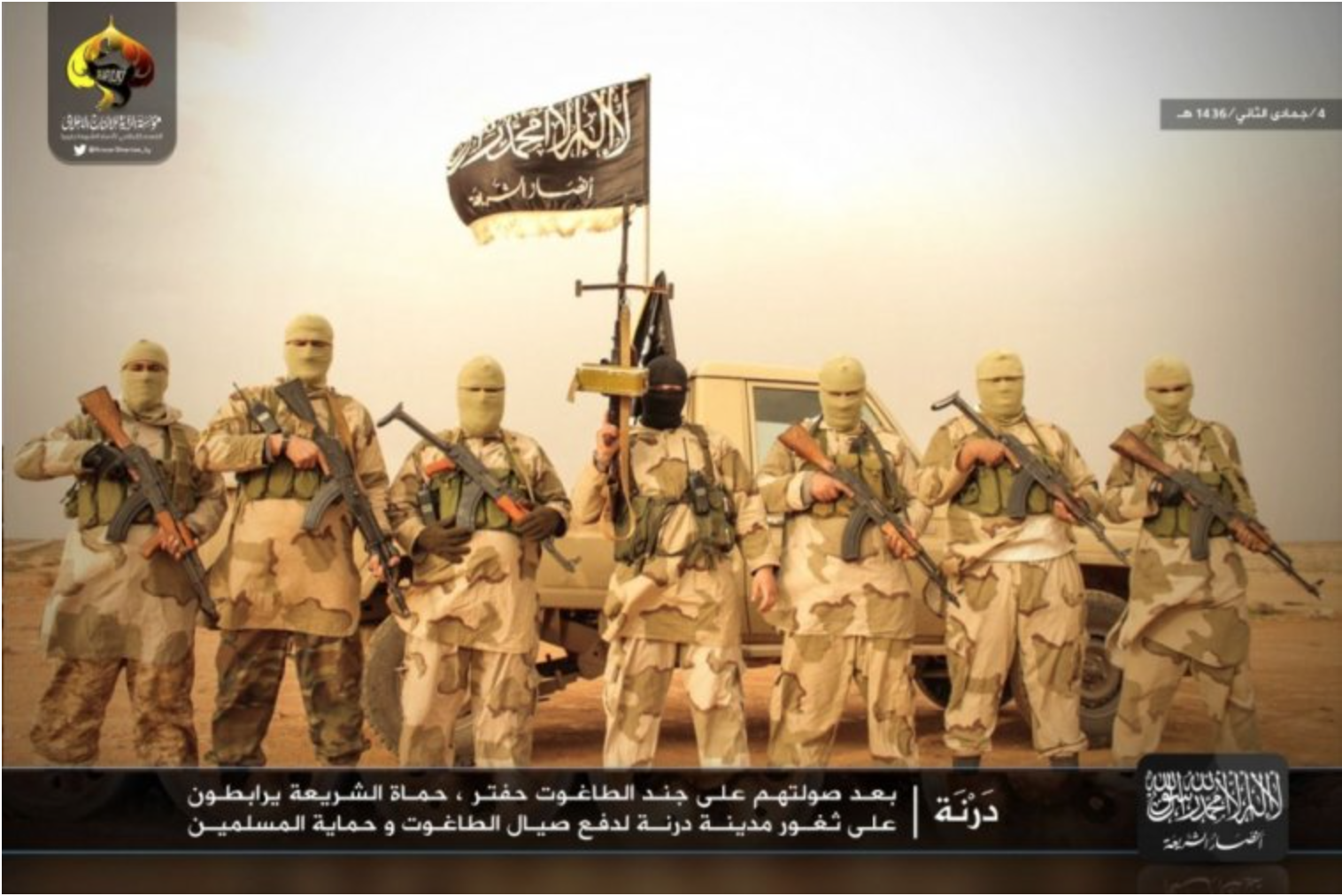
Ansar al Sharia Libya fighters

== Background ==
Ansar al-Sharia was formed during the First Libyan Civil War and rose to prominence after the killing of Muammar Gaddafi. Made up of former rebels from the Abu Obayda Bin Aljarah Brigade, Malik Brigade and February 17th Martyrs Brigade and several other groups, the Salafist militia initially made their name by posting videos of themselves fighting in the Battle of Sirte, the final battle in the war.

Their first major public appearance occurred on 7 June 2012, when they led a rally of as many as two hundred pickup trucks mounted with artillery along Benghazi's Tahrir Square and demanded the imposition of Sharia law. According to the New York Times, "Western diplomats who watched said they were stunned by the scale and weaponry of the display."

The leader of Ansar al-Sharia, Sheikh Muhammad al-Zahawi, later gave an interview on a local TV station forbidding participation in Libya's first post-civil war parliamentary elections on the grounds that they were un-Islamic. The militia went on to provide security to some public property in eastern Libya, including Benghazi's Al Jala Hospital. The group is reportedly the military arm of Al-Dawa wa Al-Islah, a charitable organization.

Noman Benotman, a former member of the Libyan Islamic Fighting Group and analyst of Libyan Islamism claims that Ansar al-Sharia is less an organization than a term applied to an amorphous coalition of Islamist and Salafist groups active in eastern Libya. The logo of the Ansar al-Sharia is a pair of AK-47 assault rifles, a clenched fist with one finger pointed up, an open Koran, and a black flag.

== Activities ==
Fawzi Bukatef, the leader in Benghazi of the rival Islamist militia February 17th Martyrs Brigade, claimed that members of the organisation had been responsible for the assassination of Abdul Fatah Younis, the commander of rebel forces during the Libyan Civil War.

Ansar al-Sharia carried out destruction of Sufi shrines in Benghazi, which they regarded as idolatrous. In November 2011, Libyan Salafis engaged in a series of attacks on Sufi shrines all over the country. Mohamed Yousef el-Magariaf, the president of the General National Congress (GNC) denounced the shrine attacks as "disgraceful acts" and said "those involved were criminals who would be pursued."

Ansar al-Sharia used its online presence to denounce the 2013 capture and removal from Libya of al-Qaeda operative Abu Anas al-Libi, by American military forces.

Aside from militant activities, Ansar al-Sharia has attempted to gain local support through Dawah (missionary activities), the provision of social services, ranging from security patrols to garbage collection, and the establishment of medical clinics and religious schools. In January 2015, the group introduced Islamic religious police and a sharia court in parts of Benghazi.

== 2012 U.S. diplomatic mission attack in Benghazi ==
On 11 September 2012, the United States Department of State Operations Center advised the White House Situation Room and other U.S. security units that Ansar al-Sharia was claiming responsibility for the attack on the U.S. diplomatic mission in Benghazi that had just occurred. Witnesses said they saw vehicles with the group's logo at the scene of the assault and that armed fighters there acknowledged at the time that they belonged to Ansar al-Sharia. Libyan witnesses also said they saw Ahmed Abu Khattala, a commander of Ansar al-Sharia, leading the embassy attack, a claim Khattala later denied.

According to FDD's Long War Journal, Ansar al-Sharia issued a statement the next day, on 12 September 2012, asserting that it "didn't participate as a sole entity" and that the attack "was a spontaneous popular uprising" in reaction to the YouTube film trailer of Innocence of Muslims, considered to be anti-Islamic.

On 6 August 2013, U.S. officials confirmed that Ahmed Abu Khattala, the Libyan leader of Ansar al-Sharia, had been charged with playing a significant role in the 2012 attack on the U.S. diplomatic compound in Benghazi. According to NBC, the charges were filed under seal in Washington, D.C., in late July 2013 Khattala was arrested by U.S. Delta Force special operations personnel in a raid in Libya on 15 June 2014. He was transported to the United States aboard the USS New York transport dock and was eventually tried in a U.S. criminal court.

== Temporary withdrawal and resurgence ==
On 21 September 2012, after massive anti-militia protests in Benghazi which largely blamed Ansar al-Sharia for the mission attack, hundreds of protesters stormed the militia headquarters, pulled down flags of the militia and torched a vehicle inside the base. The group was forced out of its bases in Benghazi the next day.

A few hours after the attack, Martyrs of 17 February, together with Bou Salim Martyrs brigade, allegedly agreed to disband, however about 150-200 militiamen moved from Benghazi to Jebel Akhdar area.

As of December 2012, the group still existed, although it had adopted a low-key position. By March 2013, the group had returned to Benghazi and began patrolling hospitals and manning checkpoints, as well as providing humanitarian services to residents. By late 2013, the group had opened up a branch in Derna, under the slogan "A step toward building the Islamic state". The group also established a presence in the Libyan cities of Ajdabiya and Sirte.

Ansar al-Sharia was also featured in the film 13 Hours: The Secret Soldiers of Benghazi.

== Second Libyan Civil War ==
Following prolonged tensions between Islamists and non-Islamists in Libya, on 16 May 2014 military forces loyal to General Khalifa Haftar launched a large-scale air and ground offensive codenamed Operation Dignity on Islamist militia groups in Benghazi, including Ansar al-Sharia. The offensive caused a country-wide military escalation that led to the beginning of the Second Libyan Civil War.

After initial reverses, Ansar al-Sharia, and other Islamist and jihadist militias fighting together as the Shura Council of Benghazi Revolutionaries, launched a counteroffensive against units loyal to Haftar in the following months, largely driving them out of the city by August of the same year. After capturing several army bases in this offensive, Ansar al-Sharia posted images on the internet of the weapons and equipment that had been seized, including D-30 Howitzers, multiple rocket launchers, Strela 2 man-portable air-defense systems, large quantities of ammunition and vehicles.

In late 2014, the group's leader, Mohamed al-Zahawi, died of wounds he had received from the fighting. In the months that followed, many members of Ansar al-Sharia, including the majority of its organisation in Sirte, reportedly defected to the Islamic State in Libya. On 30 March 2015, the group's chief Sharia jurist, Abu Abdullah Al-Libi, pledged allegiance to IS, and defected with a number of fighters. Ansar al-Sharia quickly announced that Abu Tamim al Libi had been selected as his replacement. For several years thereafter the group retained its independence from IS, but continued losses through casualties in fighting the Libyan National Army under Khalifa Haftar and further defections to IS, brought them to dissolution in 2017, with many of the remaining fighters going to IS.

The 2015 kidnapping and beheading of 21 Egyptian Copts in Libya for being "people of the cross, followers of the hostile Egyptian [Coptic] church," has been blamed on Ansar al-Sharia by Carol E.B. Choksy and Jamsheed K. Choksy of World Affairs.

== Terrorist organization designation ==
The United States officially listed Ansar al-Sharia as a terrorist organization in January 2014. The United Kingdom followed suit in November.
