= Battle of Sirte (2016) =

Battle in the spring of 2016, in the region of Sirte, Libya

- Part of the Second Libyan Civil War
- Map of the GNA's advances in Sirte from 16 June to 6 December 2016
Date	12 May – 6 December 2016 (6 months, 3 weeks and 3 days)
Location	Sirte District, Libya 31.2072°N 16.5917°E
Result	GNA victory: The GNA capture Abu Qurayn, Bin Jawad, Nofaliya, Harawa, Ghardabiya Air Base and Sirte power station, completely besieging the city; The GNA take control of Sirte in December 2016

Belligerents
(Libya) Government of National Accord; Libyan Army; Misrata Brigades; Misrata Military Council; Petroleum Facilities Guard; Libyan Navy; United States (since 1 Aug. 2016); U.S. Air Force; U.S. Navy; U.S. Marine Corps; United Kingdom; United Kingdom Special Forces; Royal Air Force; Royal Navy; France; French Special Forces; French Air Force; French Navy; Italy; Special Forces	Islamic State; Wilayat Tarabulus; Sirte Islamic Police

Commanders and leaders
(Libya) Fayez al-Sarraj (Head of Unity Government) (Libya) Colonel Al-Mahdi Al-Barghathi (GNA Minister of Defense) (Libya) Rida Issa (GNA navy commander) (Libya) Ibrahim Baitulmal (Head of Misrata military council) (Libya) Ismail Shukri (Head of military intelligence in Misrata) (Libya) Abdul Adeem al-Maadani † (Misrata Brigades senior commander) (Libya) Mohammed Issa (field commander) (United States) Daryl Caudle	Abu Hudhayfah al-Muhajir (ISIL governor of Wilayat Tarabulus); Abu Habib Jazrawi † (ISIL leader in Libya); Abu Omar al-Tunessi † (ISIL commander of Sirte); Hamid Malouqa al-Zliteni † (ISIL top commander); Hassan Kara † (ISIL field commander); Yusuf Mulaytan † (ISIL commander); Faiez Attiya † (ISIL commander); Qusai al-Jaili † (ISIL commander); Mirghani Badawi al-Bashir † (ISIL commander and preacher); Hassan al-Karami † (ISIL preacher)

Strength
6,000 fighters (in August 2016)	2,000–2,500 fighters

Casualties and losses
(Libya) 740 killed and 4,000+ wounded (GNA claim); 5,000 killed or wounded (ISIL claim) (United States) 1 killed (non-combat)	2,500 killed and 87+ captured (GNA claim)
- 37 civilians killed by air-strikes 35,000 people displaced (as of July 2016)

The Battle of Sirte during the Second Libyan Civil War started in the spring of 2016, in the Sirte District of Libya, between the Islamic State of Iraq and the Levant (ISIL) and the loyalist forces of the Government of National Accord (GNA) backed by the United States. ISIL forces had captured Sirte one year earlier, during the previous battle. The conflict for Sirte was described as ISIL's "last stand" in Libya.

The latter portion of this battle was concurrent with the Battle of Mosul against ISIL in Iraq, with the Raqqa campaign by the Syrian Democratic Forces on ISIL's de facto capital in Syria, and with the Battle of al-Bab in northern Syria.

== The offensive ==
=== GNA advance on Sirte, initial gains, and stalemate ===
The offensive on Sirte launched on 12 May 2016, under the name "Al-Bunyan Al-Marsoos", variously translated as "Impenetrable Wall" or "Solid Foundation". Fighting took place east of Assdada, around 80 km (50 miles) south of Misrata. On 16 May, GNA military forces recaptured Abu Grein from ISIL militants. The next day, the GNA took control over the al-Wishkah district, 25 km from Abu Grein. and eventually reached nearly 50 kilometers from Sirte.

On 19 May, an ISIL suicide bomber attacked GNA forces, 90 kilometers west of Sirte, killing 30 soldiers and wounding 50. In late May, pro-GNA military forces seized many locations near the city of Sirte from ISIL, including the Sirte power station, and advanced on the town of Jarif to the south of Sirte. Also in late May, the eastern front of Sirte saw action. The Petroleum Facilities Guard (PFG) captured the towns of Bin Jawad and Noufiliyah from ISIL.

On 4 June, GNA forces captured the Ghardabiya Air Base, 10–20 kilometers south of Sirte's center. However, ISIL recaptured the air base the following day.

On 8 June, GNA fighters entered Sirte for the first time after capturing a bridge on the city's western outskirts. The next day, fighting was concentrated near the Ouagadougou conference hall, where ISIL held religious instruction sessions, and GNA forces managed to surround the hall. Meanwhile, some ISIL fighters started retreating from Sirte, while PFG forces advanced within 70 kilometers to the east of Sirte and reached the town of Harawa.

On 10 June, the GNA captured two barracks, a bridge and an intersection in Sirte. In addition, the Libyan Navy secured Sirte's coast and blocked potential escape routes for ISIL via the sea. The following day, street fighting continued to rage in Sirte and heavy clashes took place around the Ouagadougou complex, with GNA forces hitting with artillery fire ISIL positions around the conference centre. On 12 June, GNA forces secured both Sirte's port, airport and a residential area in the east of the city, while fighting was continuing two kilometers from the conference hall. ISIL fighters in the city retreated into a densely built-up area, with snipers taking up positions against the advancing GNA forces. ISIL also started using waves of suicide-bombers to stall approaching GNA forces. Three ISIL suicide car-bombers targeted a field hospital in the west of Sirte, as well as two positions of GNA fighters, including at the Abu Hadi roundabout in the southeast of the city.

On 13 June, the GNA advance in Sirte slowed as they reached the residential areas near the city center. ISIL fighters were holed up in the central and northern part of Sirte and a GNA counter-attack against ISIL positions at the town's main western entrance, after the suicide bombings the previous day, was repelled. On 16 June, a suicide attack at a police station in Abu Grain, at a crossroad between Sirte and Misrata, killed 10 soldiers and wounded 7. Also, a six-man GNA scouting team in Sirte was killed and their bodies paraded by ISIL. On 21 June, GNA forces secured areas in the "700" neighbourhood, south of the city center, and gained ground to the west of the center of Sirte in the heavily damaged District No. 2. Other gains included: the Ben Hamal Mosque, the electricity headquarters and the radio station. During the advance, the GNA positioned themselves within a kilometer from the conference centre. Meanwhile, GNA fighters withdrew from the port, although they still controlled the port road, due to heavy ISIL sniper fire from a nearby hotel. Some 400 to 500 ISIL fighters were operating in the port area. During the advances, GNA fighters suffered heavy casualties with 39 being killed and another 140 wounded. Another report put the number of GNA dead at more than 40.

On 1 July, ISIL fighters were driven out of the "100" and "700" neighbourhoods and GNA forces had surrounded the conference hall. ISIL fighters were also still holed up at a nearby hospital, with snipers and landmines slowing the GNA's progress. The next day, the GNA captured the city center, or at least part of it, as well as the harbor. By 7 July, Mirghani Badawi al-Bashir, nicknamed "Abu-al-Harith", was killed by a drone strike. A leading local ISIL commander and a prominent Sudanese preacher, Mirghani's death was regarded as heavy blow to ISIL by experts.

On 9 July, a mass grave was discovered by GNA forces on a farm on the southern edge of Sirte. The next day, an ISIL ammunition store was hit in the city center by ground fire, while more air-strikes hit other ISIL positions. In turn, ISIL fired Grad missiles at GNA positions in the first, second and third residential districts and the university campus.

On 15 July, heavy clashes erupted around the conference centre leaving 21 GNA soldiers dead and 139 wounded. During the fighting, three ISIL suicide car-bombers, including a Libyan and an Egyptian, hit GNA forces in an unsuccessful counter-attack. GNA fighters managed to enter the conference complex, but had not been able to capture it. Some 10 days later, the GNA captured the largest ISIL bomb factory in Sirte, a hotel in the eastern part of the city, part of the "Dollar" neighbourhood, and the security headquarters.

== Operation Odyssey Lightning ==
On 1 August 2016, the Pentagon announced the U.S. military effort to support the Libyan government against ISIL would be code-named Operation Odyssey Lightning.

On 1 August, at the request of the GNA, the United States Navy and United States Marine Corps Harriers and helicopters launched from USS Wasp (LHD-1) and USS San Antonio, began to bomb Sirte, targeting ISIL tanks and vehicles in support of the GNA forces. The attacks put further pressure on the estimated 1,000 ISIL fighters who remained in the city center. The strikes hit two T-72 tanks, a fighting position and two construction vehicles. The next day, an ISIL rocket launcher and a heavy equipment excavator were also hit. During these airstrikes, another Sudanese ISIL commander, Qusai al-Jaili, was reportedly killed, though other sources said he had died of illness or wounds. Al-Jaili had achieved prominence by masterminding the escape of four assassins of U.S. diplomat John Granville from Kober Prison in Khartoum in 2009. By 4 August, "Dollar" was secured. On 7 August, GNA troops showed a small former ISIL training camp with an assault course, along with fox holes, that was taken by GNA forces.

On 8 August, the GNA seized an area of guest houses close to the Ouagadougou conference centre. Two days later, GNA forces took control of the Ouagadougou centre, Sirte's Ibn Sina hospital and the university campus. During the fighting, a GNA fighter jet was shot down over Sirte with both pilots missing. By 11 August, 70 percent of Sirte was under GNA control. At this point, the GNA started launching incursions into neighbourhoods 1 and 3, two of the districts that were still IS-held. The following day, bombardment commenced of neighbourhoods 1 and 2. Meanwhile, it was confirmed the GNA also took control of the Amina Hotel, the police academy building and the Al-Giza military zone.

=== "Macmadas" ===
On 12 August, the GNA announced the beginning of the final battle, dubbed Macmadas, to completely capture Sirte. On the next day, the city's radio station and the "Indian" buildings were captured by the GNA as they advanced into neighbourhood 2. During the fighting, there was an attempted ISIL suicide bomb attack against the advancing forces. Three days later, pro-GNA militias captured the neighbourhood 2 district and started advancing into neighbourhood 1. During the fighting for neighbourhood 2, ISIL fighters launched nine suicide bombings that killed 9 GNA fighters and wounded 82. Following the capture of this area, only neighbourhoods 1 and 3 remained IS-held.

On 18 August, ISIL fighters from outside the city attacked GNA fighters at a rallying area and a checkpoint, killing at least 10 GNA fighters and wounding 20. Another attack by three IS suicide-bombers was prevented and the attackers killed. Between 21 and 22 August, pro-GNA militias captured the Ribat mosque, the city's biggest and main mosque, as well as the internal security building that was used as an IS prison, a courthouse, the Al-Naga district and Dubai Street.

During their advances, the GNA discovered a major horde of gold, money and weapons inside the IS security headquarters. In one room, there were boxes of gold, jewelry, wads of Tunisian currency, rifles and shotguns, computers, radios and cartons of telephone cards. On 25 August, GNA's spokesman for the operation Mohamed al-Ghasry stated that ISIL had withdrawn from most of the neighbourhood 3 into a small part of the neighbourhood as well as the northern half of neighbourhood 1.

On 28 August, the GNA suffered heavy casualties in fighting while advancing into neighbourhood 1 and 3. Five car bombs were deployed by the militants in the battle though at least one was destroyed before it could reach its target. Hospitals in Sirte reported that 35 GNA fighters died and 150 more were wounded. U.S. and Libyan warplanes bombarded ISIL-held neighbourhoods in Sirte overnight. The Cordoba mosque which ISIL had renamed to Abu Musab Zarqawi mosque was captured on the same day along with other areas of neighbourhood 3. GNA militias announced the next day that they had completely captured neighbourhood 1 with ISIL still controlling half of neighbourhood 3. 10 GNA fighters were killed during the clashes while 12 were wounded.

On 3 September, pro-GNA militias launched an offensive on the last-ISIL held areas of Sirte and stated they had captured several buildings including two banks and a hotel. An attempted suicide bombing by ISIL was also thwarted by the militias. 7–10 pro-GNA fighters were reported to be killed, while 30–60 were wounded in the clashes. On 5 September, the media wing of Al-Bunyan Al-Marsous reported that it had captured ISIL pockets in the Jizah neighbourhood including a Wihda Bank branch. On 6 September, the pro-GNA forces captured the buildings of the civil court and the savings bank in neighbourhood 3 in addition to an ammunition stockpile belonging to the militants containing mines, explosives and warheads.

=== New stalemate ===
On 8 September, pro-GNA forces stated that ISIL was using civilians as human shields which was delaying the advancement of pro-GNA fighters. Some days later, they also pointed out that the slipping away of some militants as pro-GNA militias advanced was behind the delay. There were concerns that all of them hadn't been cleared behind the lines as some militants had carried out attacks on pro-GNA troops behind them. On 14 September, four foreigners and two Libyans were freed from ISIL's prisons in Sirte. The foreigners included two North Koreans and two Indians. Meanwhile, AFRICOM carried out airstrikes against ISIL, hitting six positions of the group and a car bomb. By 16 September, 15 people including nine Libyans, three Koreans, two Indians and a Palestinian had been freed.

On 18 September, al-Bunyan al-Marsous launched an offensive against the last ISIL holdouts in Sirte. During the clashes, two car bombs were destroyed, before they could reach pro-GNA fighters. Pro-GNA militias stated they had captured the Social Security headquarters, an ISIL field hospital, Fateh School, Grand Mosque and a workshop for manufacturing explosives. Three pro-GNA fighters were killed, while two ISIL commanders, Hassan al-Karami and Walid Al-Furjan, were confirmed to have been killed in the clashes. Clashes renewed on 22 September, with 10 militants and 9 pro-GNA fighters being killed. Three car bombs were destroyed before reaching their targets, while the spokesman for Misratan militias stated that the militants had been cut off from each other and surrounded in two different areas. Misrata's Central Hospital reported on 23 September that 10 pro-GNA fighters had been killed while 65 were injured during clashes from 22 to 23 September. As the situation for the besieged ISIL forces became increasingly dire, media reports started to emerge that ISIL began to employ female fighters as snipers in an extremely unusual move for the militant group.

Between 25 and 26 September, AFRICOM carried out airstrikes on an ISIL supply point and other positions around the "600 Buildings" neighbourhood.

On 2 October 2016, a group of ISIL militants who attempted to escape the city were killed. The same day, an attack by ISIL militants on a GNA checkpoint from outside Sirte, near Ghardabiya Air Base, in a possible attempt to lift the siege of the city, was repelled. Overall, 80 ISIL and 8 GNA fighters were reported killed during the clashes, while another 57 GNA fighters were wounded. A Dutch photojournalist, Jeroen Oerlemans, who was covering the government-backed offensive against ISIL, also died due to ISIL sniper fire.

=== ISIL pocket split ===
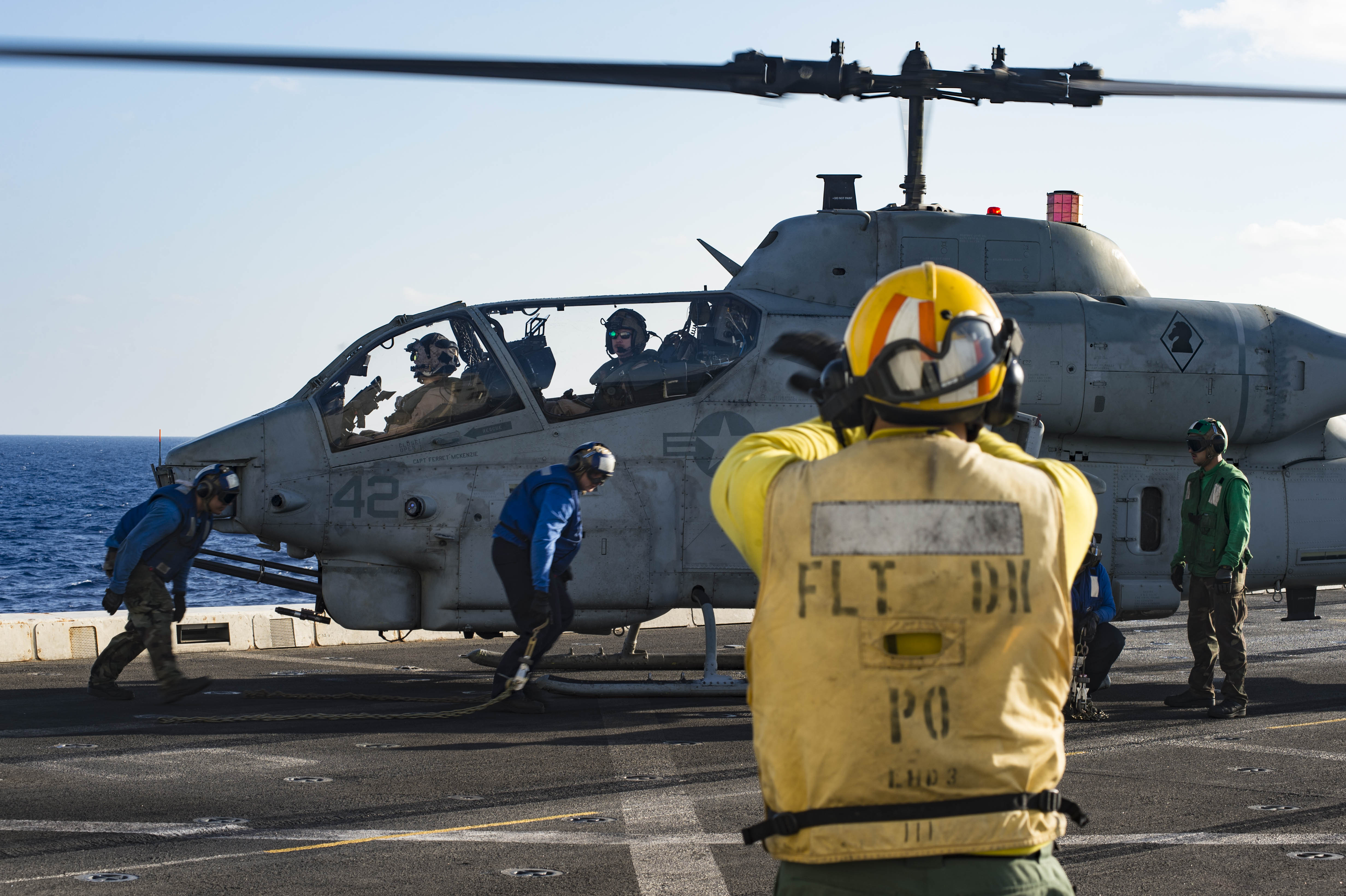
One Bell AH-1 SuperCobra preparing to take off from the USS Wasp on October 25, 2016 for a mission to Sirte.

On 7 October 2016, GNA forces managed to separate the last ISIL-controlled areas in Sirte, after taking control of the dividing line between the "600" neighbourhood and the sea-view Jizah apartment buildings. The control of the dividing line also cut ISIL aid routes. During their advances, the GNA discovered secret tunnels connecting the besieged areas in the city. During the day's fighting, the senior ISIL leader Abu al-Baraa al-Masri was killed on the frontline in Jizah neighbourhood, along with two ISIL snipers. On 9 October, GNA forces advanced across two streets in the "600" neighbourhood. The media officer of the Misratan militias stated that they had completely encircled the neighbourhood. Two female militants reportedly surrendered along with their children, in fear of being used as suicide bombers. Another media official reported that pro-GNA fighters had also advanced into the al-Manara neighbourhood.

As of 12 October, the GNA air force and artillery were intermittently bombarding ISIL positions in the "600" neighbourhood. U.S. airstrikes were also being conducted. Overall between 9 and 15 October, at least 22 pro-GNA fighters were killed in clashes, while more than half a dozen militants also died. On 14 October, street-to-street fighting, involving tanks and armoured vehicles, took place in the Jizah neighbourhood. On 16 October, the GNA captured the Cambo (al-Manara) neighbourhood, including tunnels and a field hospital, and advanced several hundred metres into Jizah neighbourhood.

On 22 October, pro-GNA militias announced they had captured the "600" neighbourhood, leaving only the Jizah area under ISIL control, although the last apartment blocks in the "600" neighbourhood were not cleared until the next day.

=== Attack on the last ISIL-held district ===
On 26 October, GNA militias launched an attack on the Jizah neighbourhood by shelling it with heavy artillery, managing to take control of several residential blocks by the following day. In the fighting between 19 and 26 October, 22 GNA fighters and more than 22 ISIL militants were killed, while 24 foreign hostages were freed by the GNA. Additionally, 24 civilians crossed the frontline into GNA territory, while seven unidentified and burned bodies were found. On 31 October, the GNA launched a new attack on the Jizah neighbourhood from the seaside.

By this point, about 100 ISIL militants were reportedly left, holding out in the city. The United States also ended its bombing campaign on ISIL in Sirte, after carrying out a total of 367 airstrikes. The United States Department of Defense stated that airstrikes would be resumed if they were needed. On 2 November, GNA forces gained a new foothold in the last ISIL-controlled area of the city and advanced further on 6 November. During the fighting, the GNA freed 14 civilians, while a senior GNA commander was killed.

On 9 November, after more advances by the GNA, only a few ISIL snipers were estimated to be left in the area still under their control. On 12 November, the GNA stated that it was delaying the final assault because it would result in intense street-to-street fighting. They also stated that they were taking a step-by-step approach to limit casualties among their ranks, as well as the civilians held as human shields by ISIL. On 16 November, GNA advanced to control the "20" street. The next day, they tightened the siege on the group and found bodies of 11 militants, likely killed in recent clashes. They also destroyed a car bomb and freed three women along with a number of children.

By this point, ISIL territory in the city had been reduced to just one square kilometer. About 400 ISIL militants, who had managed to escape Sirte since the beginning of the offensive, were conducting guerrilla attacks behind the frontline. The GNA advanced further on 21 November, capturing a fortified school. They seized a number of barricaded houses on the next day. The United States also resumed its airstrikes on ISIL at this point. Advancing GNA fighters were delayed by booby traps and mines. Some GNA units had to be pulled back from the narrow frontline and were reserved for relieving other fighters.

By 22 November, only 50 militants were remaining in a few dozen properties still controlled by ISIL. Between 22 and 24 November, the US conducted more than a dozen airstrikes, hitting 61 ISIL positions. GNA captured 25 houses in addition to a stash of arms on 24 November. On 26 November, GNA managed to take control of around 30 buildings, facing heavy resistance. During the clashes, two suicide bombers targeted them, while a woman, whom they were trying to provide a safe passage, started firing on them instead, before being killed.

By 1 December, the territory under ISIL control was reduced to around 50 buildings in the area of two city blocks. By this point, the GNA also closed off all pathways for the militants to escape. Only families, women and children were allowed to exit the area. On 2 December, several women, who pretended to surrender blew themselves up, killing four GNA fighters and wounding 38 others. ISIL had also recaptured a few buildings. The campaign was temporarily halted to preserve the lives of civilians, while a senior militant was arrested and 4 others surrendered. 42 women and children were rescued on the next day, while six militants, who tried to escape, were arrested. The GNA captured nine buildings on 4 December, with 10 women and children leaving ISIL-held area, while 2 militants, who tried to escape, were arrested.

On 5 December, GNA spokesman Ridda Issa claimed that the GNA was in control of Jizah neighbourhood, while another spokesman, Mohamed al-Gasri, stated that they were besieging the remaining militants. There were premature reports that Sirte had been fully captured by GNA. GNA fighters later confirmed that they still hadn't fully captured Jizah neighbourhood, with ISIL still controlling around 10 buildings.

By 6 December, ISIL was in control of less than 10 houses, with the GNA trying to neutralize a small number of militants still present in the area and rescuing a group of women and children. Sirte was completely captured by pro-GNA militias later in the day. The last holdouts were defeated after heavy clashes earlier in the day and a combing operation on the last 3 ISIL-held buildings where they were barricaded. The last nine militants surrendered to GNA during the night, along with 10 women and children. By the end of the offensive, the United States had carried out 495 airstrikes against the group in Sirte. 21 women and 31 children were released from ISIL-held territory. A total of 12 fighters were killed in the clashes on the last day.

On 20 December 2016, AFRICOM formally announced the end of its military operations to help GNA capture Sirte.

In September 2017, the US Africa Command announced that 495 precision airstrikes were carried out in and around Sirte and 800 to 900 ISIL fighters were killed during the operation in Sirte between 1 August and 19 December 2016. In addition to the airstrikes, the destroyer USS Carney (DDG-64) fired 285 5-inch shells at ISIL targets throughout the city.

Members of the US Armed Forces consisted of the 22nd Marine Expeditionary Unit (VMM-264, HMLA-467, BLT 1/6, and CLB 22) aboard the USS Wasp and USS San Antonio.

== Aftermath ==
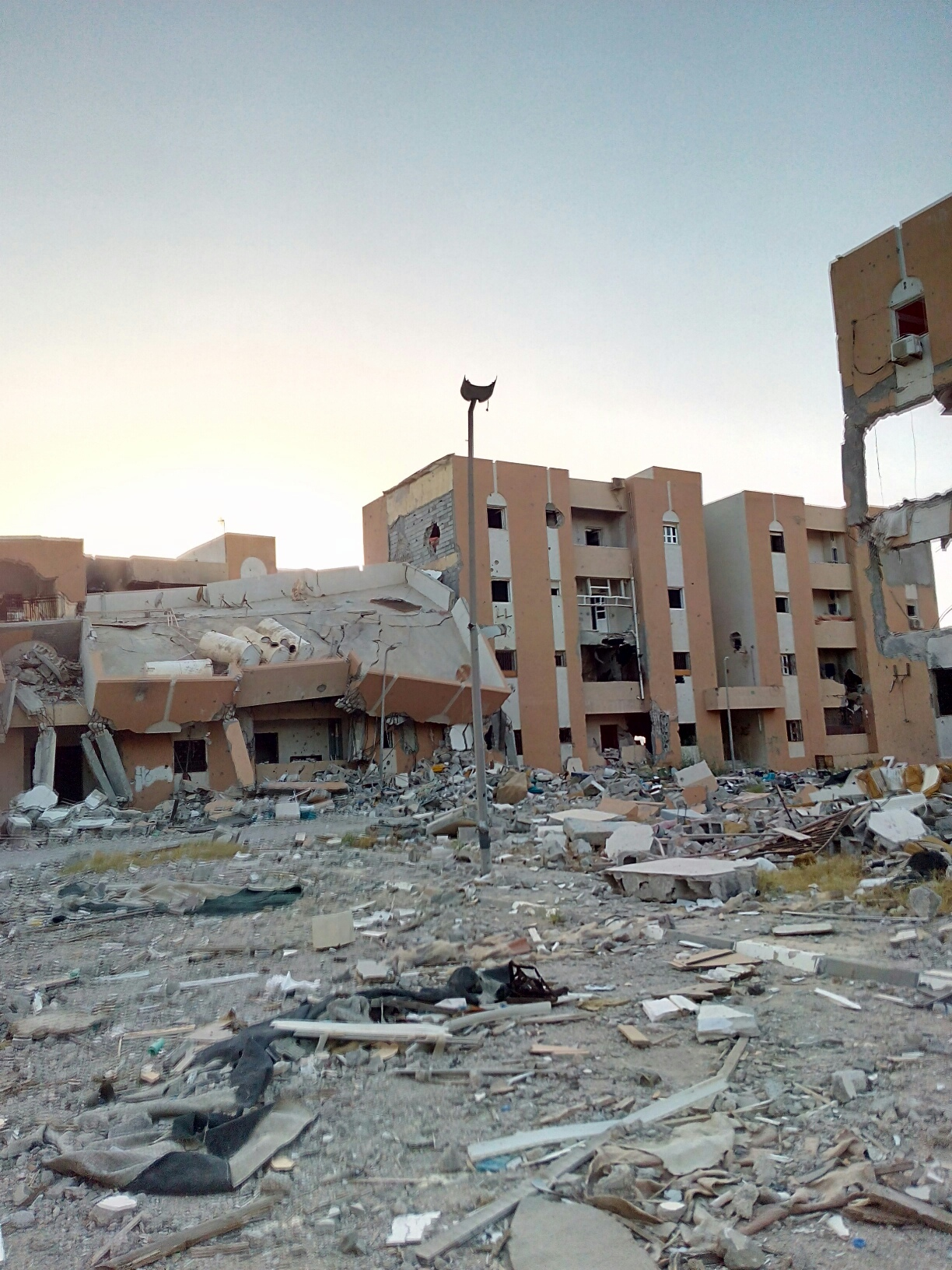
Destroyed buildings in Sirte in 2017

GNA spokesman Ridda Issa stated after capturing Sirte that they would continue their military operations to secure the area around the city, as Libyan officials and those of other countries were concerned that a number of militants who had escaped before the battle or during it may mount an insurgent campaign from outside the city. Jean-Yves Le Drian, Defence Minister of France, meanwhile praised the pro-GNA militias for defeating ISIL. Celebrations erupted among the pro-GNA militias after capture of the city. Another spokesman Ahmes Hadiya stated that while it was the last major battle, it wasn't the end of military operations or a declaration of liberation. After the defeat of ISIL, the Central Committee for Municipal Council Elections (CCMCE) scheduled mayoral elections for the city on 12 December 2016 at the Local Government Ministry in Tripoli, with CCMCE's head Otman Gajiji supervising it. The Military Intelligence Chief, Ismaeil Al-Shukri later in a televised statement denied that diehard militants had escaped the city. He also accused regional countries as well as countries that have political and economic interests in Libya, of sponsoring ISIL inside the country. The Grand Mufti of Libya, Sadiq Al-Ghariani, praised victory over ISIL, while criticizing and accusing the United Nations Support Mission in Libya (UNSMIL) of neglecting the victory. He called for UNSMIL to be replaced.

Most of the city was destroyed in the battle, with unexploded explosives strewn across the streets, with key services and vital infrastructure also destroyed. The Red Crescent found 230 bodies confirmed to be of ISIL militants, as well as 36 other bodies in former positions of the group. Bunyan Marsous operations room stated, on the other hand, that 483 bodies were recovered. Mukhtar Al-Madani was elected as the mayor on 12 December. Ahmed Abu Shahma was appointed as the military governor by Bunyan Marsous on 14 December. GNA's Prime Minister Fayez al-Sarraj officially announced the end of military operations and "liberation of Sirte" on 18 December. UN's envoy to Libya Martin Kobler termed the ISIL defeat as a major step towards ending terrorism in the country and called for national reconciliation.

On 18 January 2017, US B-2 bombers bombed 2 ISIL camps to the south of Sirte, killing 90 ISIL militants.

Mass graves

After the liberation of Sirte, the Libyan government's General Authority for Research and Identification of Missing Persons began conducting excavations of the many mass graves in and around Sirte.

On October 11, 2018, a mass grave was discovered in Al-Daheir, near Sirte, containing 100 bodies likely of IS fighters. In December 2018, the bodies of 30 Ethiopian Christians killed by IS in Sirte were discovered and reinterred later in Ethiopia. The victims' executions were recorded in a 2015 video released by IS.

Five bodies were discovered on the beach in Sirte in 2020. Three of the bodies were wearing military clothing, and two were decapitated. Twelve bodies were found in 2021 at the Ibn Khaldun school.

In October 2022, 42 bodies were found in Sirte at a mass grave near the Ibn Khaldun school in Giza al-Bahriya district. The mass grave was discovered after a tipoff from former IS fighters. The site had previously been known to Libyan authorities, with 11 bodies being discovered there in May 2022. The victims at this site were suspected to be civilians killed by IS. Another 15 bodies were discovered at the Ibn Sina Teaching Hospital in September 2022.

A further 18 bodies were discovered on January 1, 2023 in the Sabaa area of Sirte.

In July 2024, 59 bodies were found in a mass grave in the al-Campo area of Giza al-Bahriya.

== See also ==
- Islamic State of Iraq and the Levant in Libya
- ISIL occupation of Derna
- Battle of Benghazi (2014–2017)
- Battle of Derna (2018)
- Battle of Baghuz Fawqani
- List of wars and battles involving ISIL
- Timeline of ISIL-related events
- Timeline of the Libyan Civil War (2014–present)
