= Battle of Sirte (2015) =

Fall of Sirte on ISIL

- Part of the Libyan civil war (2014–2020)
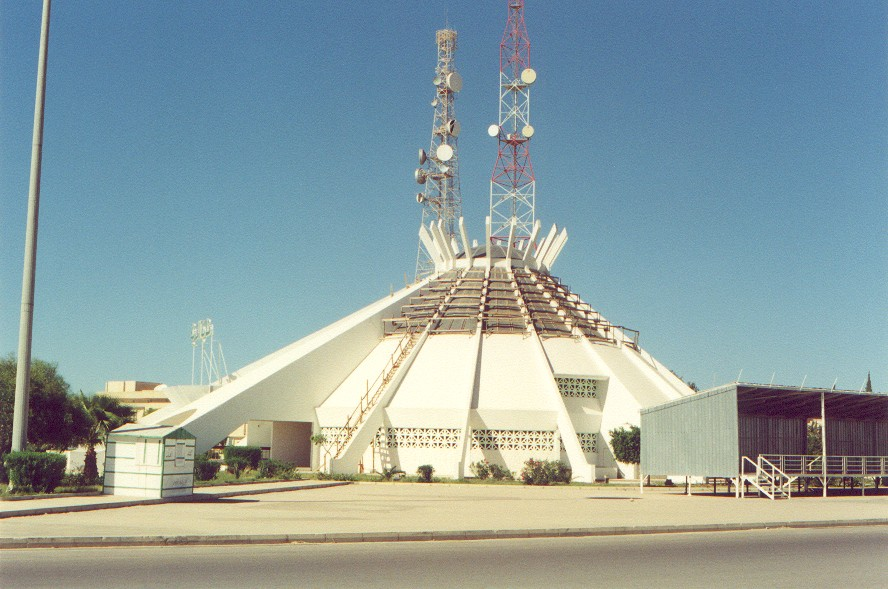
- Mathābah al-Madīnah, Assembly building, in Sirte (2007)
Date	14 March – 31 May 2015 (2 months, 2 weeks and 3 days)
Location	Sirte, Libya
Result	Major ISIL victory

Belligerents
Libya Shield Force	Islamic State of Iraq and the Levant: Wilayat Tarabulus

Commanders and leaders
(Libya) General Mohammad al-Ajtal (Army Commander) (Libya) Suliman Ali Mousa	(Islamic State) Abu Nabil al-Anbari (ISIL commander of North Africa) (Islamic State) Ali Al-Qarqaa (ISIL Emir of Nofaliya)

Strength
Unknown	(Islamic State) 2,000 fighters

Casualties and losses
10 killed	41 killed

The Battle of Sirte refers to the battle in the spring of 2015, in the region of Sirte, Libya, between the Islamic State of Iraq and the Levant (ISIL) and the Libya Shield Force. ISIL forces had been present in the city since February 2015, before the Fall of Nofaliya. After Nofaliya fell to ISIL forces, the Tripoli-based government had decided to send reinforcements to recapture Sirte.

== The battle ==
The fighting began 14 March 2015, between forces of the Islamic State of Iraq and the Levant and the forces of the Libya Shield Force. No death toll was initially given, but the fighting was described as being violent, and stopped at dusk. Among those killed was Ahmed al-Rouissi, a Tunisian ISIL commander.

On 18 March, 12 Tripoli government soldiers were killed during fighting against Islamic State fighters; 10 in Nofaliya and 2 in Bin Jawad.

On 25 March, ISIL attacked a Brigade 166 checkpoint, 15 kilometers west of Sirte, killing five militiamen.

Over the next two months, sporadic fighting took place around Sirte. On 20 May, ISIL forces again attacked a Brigade 166 position. According to a Libya Dawn official, 23 ISIL fighters and one soldier were killed. On 28 May ISIL captured the nearly-ruined Ghardabiya Airbase and the Great Man-Made River water project outside of Sirte when Libyan Shield Forces withdrew. Over the next few days, Libya Shield Forces withdrew to positions 12 miles west of Sirte, after ISIL advanced to the east, south, and west of the city.

== Aftermath ==
During August and September, new clashes erupted in Sirte between pro-Gaddafi loyalists and ISIL forces. On 23 September, ISIL once again asserted its control over the whole of Sirte after it expelled all the remaining pro-Gaddafi elements.

In February 2016, U.S. officials believed that there were 5,000 to 6,000 ISIL fighters in Libya, and gave a maximum estimate of up to 6,500. This marked an increase from previous estimates in the 2,000 to 3,000 range. Many of ISIL's new recruits came from Iraq, Syria and Tunisia. At this point, ISIL's strength was increasing in Libya while simultaneously declining in Iraq and Syria.

In May 2016, the Government of National Accord started a new battle to retake Sirte.

== See also ==
- Battle of Sirte (2016)
- February 2015 Egyptian airstrikes in Libya
- Fall of Nofaliya (2015)
- Derna campaign (2014–2016)
- Islamic State of Iraq and the Levant in Libya
- List of wars and battles involving ISIL
- Timeline of ISIL related events
