= Bin Jawad District =

District in Libya from 1983 to 1987

Coordinates: 30°46′N 18°03′E

Bin Jawad District, (Arabic: جالو, Baladiyah Bin Jawwad) was one of the districts (baladiyah) of Libya from 1983 to 1987. It lay in the northern part of the country bordering the Gulf of Sidra. Its capital was Bin Jawad. Under Italy it was in Misrata Province. Before being made a baladiyah in 1983, it was part of the governorate system. In 1987 the area was incorporated into Sirte District and has remained there since.

== Towns and villages 1983–1987 ==
The settlements in Bin Jawad District were: Nofaliya, Sidra, Bin Jawad, and Ra's Lanuf.

== Current settlements ==
From west to east following the coast from Sirte there are the towns Sultan, Harawa, Uwayja, Nofaliya, Bin Jawad, Sidra, Ra's Lanuf. The next settlements in the east are Qaryat Bishr and Brega.

== See also ==
Bin Jawad
