= February 2015 Egyptian airstrikes in Libya =

Egyptian airstrikes in Libya

- Part of the War against the Islamic State and Egyptian involvement in the Libyan civil war (2014–2020)
Date	16 February 2015
Location	Libya
Result	Ground targets destroyed by the Egyptian Air Force

Belligerents
Egypt; Libya (House of Representatives)	Islamic State

Commanders and leaders
Abdel Fattah el-Sisi; Sedki Sobhi; Younes Hamed; Khalifa Haftar; Saqer al-Joroushi	Abu Nabil Al Anbari (ISIL commander of North Africa); Muhammand Abdullah (Top ISIL Judge in Derna); Abdullah Al-Libi; Ali Al Qarqaa (ISIL Emir of Nofaliya); Ahmed Rouissi †

Units involved
Egyptian Air Force	Military of ISIL

Strength
Six F-16 jets	1,000–3,000 (Feb. 2015 estimate)

Casualties and losses
None reported	81 killed and 55 captured
- 7 civilians killed 35 Egyptian citizens allegedly kidnapped

The February 2015 Egyptian airstrikes in Libya against Islamic State positions in Libya took place on 16 February 2015, and were triggered by a video released by ISIL in Libya a day earlier, depicting the beheading of 21 Coptic Christians from Egypt. Within hours, the Egyptian Air Force responded with airstrikes against ISIL training camps and weapons stockpiles in retaliation for the killings. Warplanes acting under orders from the Libyan government also struck targets in Derna, reportedly in coordination with Egypt.

The air strikes had allegedly killed up to 64 ISIL militants, including three of the leadership, in the coastal cities of Derna and Sirte. Libyan media reported that at least 35 more Egyptians had been rounded up by ISIL in retaliation for the air raids.

As the airstrikes took place, Egypt's Foreign Ministry called on the US-led coalition striking Islamic State of Iraq and the Levant targets in Syria and Iraq to broaden its scope to North Africa and take action against the extremist group in Libya.

== Background ==
In 2011, a NATO-backed uprising toppled Libya's longtime ruler Muammar Gaddafi, and the country has witnessed instability and unrest ever since. Egyptian authorities have long expressed concern over the instability in eastern Libya spilling over into Egypt due to the rise of jihadist movements there, a region which Cairo believes to have developed into a safe transit for wanted Islamists following the 2013 coup d'état in Egypt that ousted Muslim Brotherhood-backed president Mohamed Morsi. There have been numerous attacks on Egypt's trade interests in Libya which were rampant prior to Gen. Khalifa Haftar's Operation Dignity offensive in May 2014, especially with the kidnapping of truck drivers and sometimes workers were murdered. In addition to this, arms smuggled from Libya, including rockets and anti-aircraft weaponry, have flooded Egypt's black markets through the porous border both countries share, often reaching extremist militants in the Sinai region of Egypt who heavily rely on these weapons.

Due to this, the military-backed government in Egypt had many reasons to support Haftar's rebellion. Furthermore, Egyptian President Abdel Fattah el-Sisi, who has become increasingly popular among many Libyans wishing for stability, has called on the United States multiple times to intervene militarily in Libya, warning that the country was becoming a major security challenge. He previously vowed not to allow the turmoil there to threaten Egypt's national security.

Following the seizure of Tripoli's international airport by Misrata-based Islamist militias, the United Arab Emirates and Egypt were accused by senior American officials in August 2014 of raiding the militants several times with warplanes stationed in Egyptian air bases. The New York Times also reported, quoting US officials, that a special forces team based in Egypt, likely involving Emirati personnel as well, stormed an Islamist camp in Derna, destroying it a few months prior to the August airstrikes.

=== Beheading of Copts ===
On 12 February 2015, the Islamic State released a report in their online magazine Dabiq, showing photos of 21 Egyptian Coptic Christians they had kidnapped in the city of Sirte and whom they threatened to kill to "avenge the [alleged] kidnapping of Muslim women by the Egyptian Coptic Church".

Three days later, a video showed up purportedly showing the beheading of the captives on a beach. The Coptic Church of Egypt confirmed the deaths, while Al-Azhar Mosque condemned the incident. Sisi announced a seven-day period of national mourning and called for an urgent meeting with the country's top security body.

=== French jet deal ===
The beheadings came a day before Egypt signed a $5.9 billion arms deal to purchase 24 Dassault Rafale warplanes from France, making it the first foreign sale for the French jet. Egypt also bought a FREMM multipurpose frigate as well as missiles. The deal is believed by analysts to be an attempt by Sisi to both upgrade Egypt's military hardware and to diversify its suppliers. Patricia Adam, president of the French parliament's defense committee, said that Egypt needed planes quickly. "You just need to take a look at what's happening at its border. They are especially worried by what's happening in Libya", she said. French defense minister, Jean-Yves Le Drian, said that the Copts' execution was one of the reasons why the Egyptian government wanted to boost its security.

== Events ==
At 10:30 p.m. EET, Egyptian President Abdel Fattah el-Sisi called for an urgent meeting with the country's National Defence Council at the Ittihadiya Palace. Later, during a midnight speech, he declared that Egypt "reserves the right to respond in the method and timing it deems suitable for retribution from these killers." At 4 a.m., six Egyptian F-16 Block 52 jets, having arrived earlier from Cairo West Air Base, took off from Marsa Matruh Air Base towards their intended targets in eastern Libya. They later struck several ISIL positions in coordination with the Libyan Air Force. The Egyptian raids were focused on Derna, while the Libyan jets struck enemy targets in Sirte and Bin Jawad. Egypt's military released a statement saying that the strikes achieved their objective and were carried out "with precision", adding that the planes returned safely to Egyptian military bases. The statement, which was announced at 8 a.m., added that the targeted locations included arms and munition depots, training camps and plantations, as well as a suspected militant hotspot known as Ghabat Bomsafer. Hossam Suweilam, an Egyptian general, told Al Arabiya that plans for the operation had already been made in the period that followed the 21 Copts' disappearance, when senior military leaders were considering such strikes as one of the possible outcomes.

=== Casualties ===
The first wave of Egyptian airstrikes killed up to 81 ISIL fighters, according to the Libyan military. Libya's air force chief, Saqr Geroushi, claimed that 40 to 50 people had been killed.

Al Jazeera reported that seven civilians were killed during the airstrikes, including three children. The Human Rights Watch called on the Egyptian and Libyan authorities to carry out an investigation into the civilian casualties resulting from the raids, stating that "any military engagement with ISIS should take all possible steps to spare civilian lives".

== Aftermath ==
=== Abduction of Egyptians ===
Local media reports from Libya, which emerged the day the airstrikes were conducted, claimed that 35 more Egyptians, mainly farm workers, have been kidnapped in areas controlled by groups such as Ansar al-Sharia and ISIL. Libya Herald reported that seven Egyptians initially went missing, but that the number later rose to thirty-five.

On 20 February, three Egyptian engineers working for a French company in Libya have been kidnapped on their way to Sabha in the southeast. Egypt's foreign ministry later confirmed the abduction and said that it contacted Libyan authorities to identify the group behind the incident.

=== Zintan airstrike ===
Libya Dawn militias have allegedly attacked an airstrip and another location in the city of Zintan, which is allied to the Egyptian-backed parliament in Tobruk, possibly in response to the Egyptian air raids, forcing the cancellation of a flight scheduled to take off from the city's airport. The plane was carrying Egyptian and Libyan citizens for their safety. A spokesman for the Libya Dawn-backed government in Tripoli said that two or three MiG jets, possibly leftovers from Gaddafi's air force, were used in the operation.

=== Al Qubbah bombings ===
On 20 February, at least 40 people have been killed in three bomb attacks by ISIL militants in the town of Al Qubbah. The bombs targeted a petrol station, a police station and Libyan MP Aguila Saleh Issa's residence. It was one of the deadliest attack in Libya since the end of the 2011 civil war. ISIL said that the attacks were carried out in retaliation to the Egyptian raids. Six Egyptians were identified among the fatalities in the attacks, and their bodies have been repatriated to Egypt via the Sallum border crossing.

== Reactions ==
French president François Hollande and Egypt's Sisi called for a United Nations Security Council meeting following the airstrikes to discuss the situation in Libya and seek out new security measures against ISIL. Sisi later called for a United Nations resolution allowing for an international intervention in Libya. "There is no other choice, taking into account the agreement of the Libyan people and government and that they call on us to act", he said. However, the governments of France, Germany, Italy, Spain, the United Kingdom and the United States issued a joint statement calling for a political resolution to the conflict in Libya. Jen Psaki, the US State Department spokeswoman, said in a statement: "We certainly respect the right of countries to make their own decisions about their own self-defence and defence of their own country". However, the Obama administration declined to openly support Egypt's airstrikes. Russia's president Vladimir Putin expressed in a letter to Sisi his country's "readiness for closest cooperation possible in the fight against all aspects of the terrorism threat".

The Arab League supported Egypt's bombing of Libya, expressing its "full understanding" of the Egyptian government's position. The body also called for the lifting of an arms embargo on the Libyan national military, which was imposed by the United Nations and the European Union in 2011, during an emergency meeting in Cairo. However, a diplomatic row evolved between Egypt and Qatar over the airstrikes. During the Arab League meeting, a Qatari foreign ministry official expressed his government's reservations over unilateral military action by Egypt, adding that this could "give an advantage to one side in Libya's conflict". The tensions culminated with Qatar recalling its ambassador from Cairo for "consultations", and Egypt's envoy to the Arab League, Tareq Adel, accusing Qatar of "supporting terrorism". Abdullatif bin Rashid Al Zayani, Secretary-General of the Gulf Cooperation Council (GCC), allegedly came in Qatar's defense and criticized Egypt's labeling of Qatar as a terrorism sponsor. He described the Egyptian diplomat's remarks as "a false accusation that defies the truth and ignores the sincere efforts that Qatar exerts to fight terrorism and extremism at all levels". Hours later, however, Zayani denied releasing such a statement, which was later removed from the GCC's website, and reiterated his support for the Egyptian government. Bahrain's state media reported that the "false statement attributed to Al Zayani" was due to Qatar's control over the website.

== See also ==
- Islamic State of Iraq and the Levant in Libya
- Derna campaign (2014–2016)
- Fall of Nofaliya (2015)
- Battle of Sirte (2015)
- Sinai insurgency
- Second Libyan Civil War
- American-led intervention in Iraq (2014–2021)
- Iranian intervention in Iraq (2014–present)
- American-led intervention in Syria
- List of wars and battles involving the Islamic State (ISIL)
