= 2015 Corinthia Hotel attack =

Terrorist attack in Tripoli (2015)

Corinthia Hotel Attack
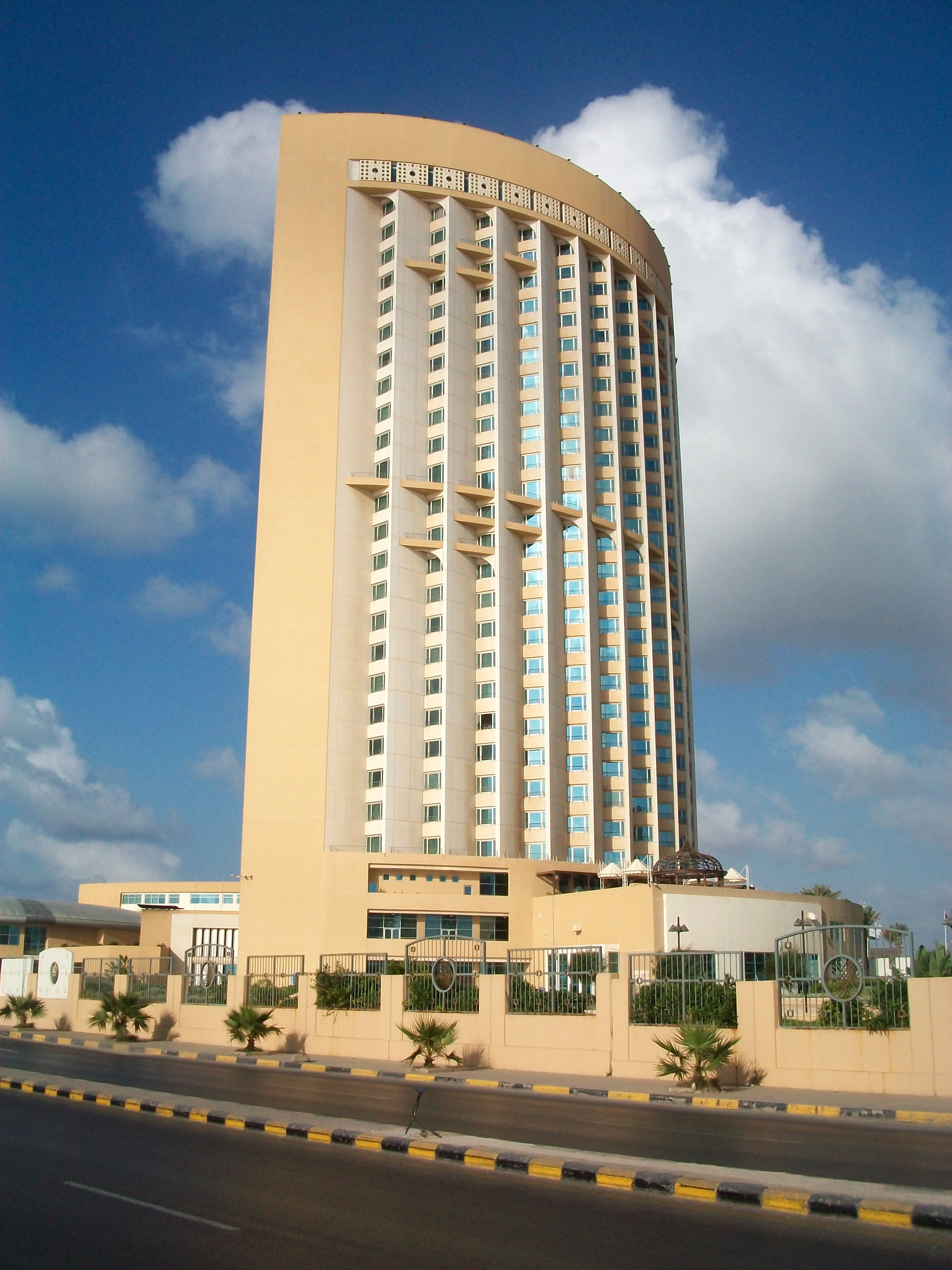
- The Corinthia Hotel main tower
- Location: 32°53′50″N 13°10′13″E; Corinthia Hotel Tripoli, Tripoli, Libya
- Date: 27 January 2015; 09:00 (UTC+2)
- Attack type: car bombing; mass shooting, suicide bombing
- Deaths: 10 (not including the perpetrators)
- Injuries: 5
- Perpetrators: Islamic State: Wilayat Tarabulus
- Motive: 2013 arrest of Abu Anas al-Libi by U.S. forces

On 27 January 2015, the Corinthia Hotel in Tripoli was attacked by men affiliated with the Islamic State (IS). The hotel was popular with foreign officials and government workers; it had previously housed the Libyan prime minister.

== Attack ==
In the early hours of 27 January 2015, IS-affiliated men detonated a car bomb in the parking garage of the hotel. In the chaos, an estimated 5 gunmen stormed past the local guard and entered the hotel, intent on killing guests.

Some of the attackers survived the initial contact, stormed the hotel and opened fire in the reception area.

== Victims ==
Deaths by nationality
Country	Number
Libya	5
Tajikistan	3
France	1
United States	1
Total	10

Five foreigners died in the attack: one American, one Frenchman, and three Tajiks (including two women). The American, David Berry, was working as a contractor for an American security firm named Crucible. Five Libyan security personnel are also reported to have died in the attack.

== Perpetrators and motivations ==
The attack was carried out by men belonging to IS's "Tripoli Province", who are believed to have been natives of Libya. The attackers' stated objective was revenge for the death of Abu Anas al-Libi, a Libyan Al-Qaeda operative who was involved in the bombing of two American embassies in 1998. He was captured by American forces inside Libya in 2013, and died at an American hospital on 2 January 2015.

== See also ==
- ISIL takeover of Derna
