= Egyptian intervention in Libya (2015–2020) =

- Part of the Libyan civil war (2014–2020) and the War against the Islamic State
- The situation in June 2020
Date	12 February 2015 – 26 October 2020
Location	Libya, with spillovers in Egypt
Result	Egyptian victory against ISIL: ISIL ground targets destroyed by the Egyptian Air Force; Egyptian backed LNA attempts at capturing Tripoli fail

Belligerents
Egypt; United Arab Emirates; Chad; In Support of: Tobruk Government; Supported by: Greece France	ISIL	Government of National Accord; Turkey; Supported by: Qatar

Units involved
Egyptian Armed Forces: Egyptian Army (from 20 July 2020); Egyptian Air Force; Egyptian Navy; United Arab Emirates Armed Forces: United Arab Emirates Air Force; Chad National Army: Chadian Ground Forces	Military of ISIL	Libyan Ground Forces (GNA-aligned); Turkish Armed Forces: Turkish Land Forces; Turkish Air Force; Turkish Navy; Turkish-backed Free Syrian Army

Egyptian intervention in Libya has been substantial since the outbreak of the Libyan civil war. It began after the Islamic State of Iraq and Levant (ISIL) released a video on 12 February 2015 of the beheading of 21 Coptic Christians (20 of which were Egyptian). In response, Egypt launched airstrikes on 16 February. Following this incident, the country became increasingly involved in Libya’s internal affairs.

== Timeline ==
=== 2015 ===
On 12 February, ISIL released a video of the beheading 21 of Coptic Christians, 20 of which were Egyptian nationals. On 16 February, Egyptian F-16s struck weapons caches and training camps belonging to ISIL in Libya. The airstrikes killed 64 ISIL fighters, including three leaders in Derna and Sirte. A further 55 militants were captured in ground assaults. Seven civilians were also killed in the strikes.

=== 2018 ===
In May, June, and September, Egypt and the United Arab Emirates conducted multiple airstrikes in Derna targeting ISIL. The Libyan Express, however, released a video alleging that Egyptian soldiers were present on the front lines alongside the Libyan National Army (LNA).

=== 2019 ===
On 5 April, Egypt expressed deep concern over renewed fighting in Tripoli and urged all parties to avoid escalation. It also reaffirmed its commitment to UN-led efforts to find a political solution to the Libyan Crisis, stressing that a political settlement was the only viable option. On 9 April, however, Egypt voiced support for the LNA and its efforts to dismantle remaining militias, while also warning against foreign intervention in the conflict.

On 14 April, Egyptian President Abdel Fattah el-Sisi met with LNA Field Marshal Khalifa Haftar in Cairo, where he declared his support for the LNA’s counterterrorism operations. He stated that such efforts, along with improved stability, would pave the way for reconstruction in several areas of Libya.

=== 2020 ===
On 5 July, Egyptian warplanes struck a site allegedly being developed by Turkey as a military base.

On 19 June, President el-Sisi publicly threatened to deploy Egyptian troops if the Government of National Accord (GNA) captured Sirte, remarks that the GNA interpreted as a declaration of war. The following day, Egypt deployed an undisclosed number of troops into Libya. Many analysts attributed this escalation to the Turkish military intervention in Libya earlier in the year.
