= Fall of Nofaliya (2015) =

Second Libyan Civil War

- Part of the Libyan civil war (2014–2020)
| Date | 8–9 February 2015 (1 day) |
| Location | Nofaliya, Libya |
| Result | ISIL victory: ISIL takes over Nofaliya, establishes control on outskirts and all roads leading to the town, and claims a "Emirate of Nofaliya", appointing Ali Al-Qarqaa as its emir; ISIL advances into Sirte and takes over government buildings |

Belligerents
| (Libya) New General National Congress | Islamic State of Iraq and the Levant: Wilayat Tripolitania |

Commanders and leaders
| (Libya) Mohamed Obaid (Head of police) | (Islamic State) Abu Bakr al-Baghdadi (Caliph of ISIL) (Islamic State) Abu Nabil al-Anbari (ISIL commander of North Africa) (Islamic State) Ali Al-Qarqaa (ISIL Emir of Nofaliya) |

Strength
| 20–50 local policemen | (Islamic State) 200–500 fighters 40 vehicles |

Casualties and losses
| 20+ policemen fled | Unknown |

The Fall of Nofaliya refers to the takeover of the town of Nofaliya in Sirte District, Libya, by the self-declared Islamic State in February 2015.

== Events ==
On 8 February 2015, a convoy of 40 heavily armed 4WD vehicles drove 140 km from Sirte, where ISIL has a significant presence, into the town of Nofaliya. Some vehicles displayed the flag of ISIL, and the convoy reportedly included many foreign fighters. Upon their arrival, the fighters ordered Nofaliya's residents to "repent" and pledge allegiance to Abu Bakr al-Baghdadi. The fighters appointed Ali Al-Qarqaa as emir of the town.

A day after Nofaliya was taken over, ISIL reinforced the entrances into the town to prevent sunrise attacks. A video of the takeover was also posted on the social media.

According to Libya Herald, with Nofaliya under its control, ISIL would be able to control the Libyan Coastal Highway. As 16 February 2015, ISIL also controls the city of Derna, Sirte, and has a presence in Tripoli and Sabratha.

Nofaliya was retaken by New General National Congress forces on 19 March 2015.

However, after GNC retook Nofaliya, they withdrew from Nofaliya and bin Jawad on 20 March because of ISIL's offensive. They withdrew from there after only two days. ISIL is setting up checkpoints after they retook the city from GNC on 28 March. On 30 March, Al-Monitor reported that Nofaliya, Sirte, and Derna were still under the control of ISIL.

Nofaliya was captured by pro-government forces on 31 May 2016.

== See also ==
- List of wars and battles involving ISIL
- Fall of Mosul
- Islamic State of Iraq and the Levant occupation of Derna
- February 2015 Egyptian airstrikes in Libya
- Battle of Sirte (2015)
