= Nofaliya =

Nofaliya النوفلية
- Town
- Location in Libya
- Coordinates: 30°46′59″N 17°49′59″E
- Country: Libya
- District: Sirte
- Time zone: UTC+2 (EET)

Nofaliya or Nawfaliya (Arabic: النوفلية Nawfalīyah) is a town in the desert in the Sirte District of Libya. It is west of Libya's major oil ports.

It is located in the former Bin Jawad District, around 20 km west of Bin Jawad and 15 km south east of ‘Uwayja.

== History ==
During World War II Nofaliya was the site of a brief skirmish in late 1942 when some of Erwin Rommel's retreating forces ran out of fuel. At the time it was home to a small fort with a few Italian buildings in addition to a mosque, some shops and a school.

During the Second Libyan Civil War, Nofaliya was fought over by the New General National Congress forces (NGNC), the Islamic State (IS); the Libyan National Army (LNA) and various militias. In February 2015, the town was taken over by the IS. A convoy of forty heavily armed vehicles arrived from Sirte and ordered Nofaliya's residents to "repent" and pledge allegiance to Abu Bakr al-Baghdadi. The fighters appointed Ali Al-Qarqaa as "emir" of the town. Nofaliya was briefly retaken by New General National Congress forces on 19 March 2015, but they withdrew the next day. The LNA took the town, but IS regained the town from the LNA the following week. It was not until the Bunyan Marsous offensive in Spring of 2016 that pro-government forces retook the city on 31 May 2016. However, in December 2016 militia forces, believed to be units of the Benghazi Defence Brigades, attempted to take over Nofaliya, driving off the NGNC forces, but were in turn driven out the same day by the Libyan National Army (LNA).
