= 'Uwayja =

- Village
- Location in Libya
- Coordinates: 30°54′24″N 17°42′47″E
- Country: Libya
- District: Sirte
- Time zone: UTC+2 (EET)

'Uwayja, also known as Marsa al 'Uwayja, is a village in the Sirte District in Libya.
