= Abu al-Baraa el-Azdi =

Yemeni militant and member of ISIL

- أبو البراء شرم الأزدي
- Born: Mohammed Abdullah; Yemen
- Other name: Abu al-Baraa el-Azdi
- Citizenship: Yemeni
- Organization: Islamic State

Mohammed Abdullah (Arabic: محمد عبد الله), also known as Abu al-Baraa el-Azdi, is a Yemeni militant and member of the Islamic State. Both names are noms de guerre. He was reported to originally be a preacher who joined IS in Syria.

He rose to prominence in mid-November 2014 when IS leader Abu Bakr al-Baghdadi appointed him Emir and leader of the city of Derna in Libya, soon after the partial takeover of the city by IS and declaration of the Wilayah Barqah (Province of Eastern Libya). He also became the city's top religious judge.

IS regularly appoints foreigners to key government positions.
