= Derna campaign (2014–2016) =

Military campaign in Libya

- Part of the Libyan civil war (2014–2020) and the War against the Islamic State
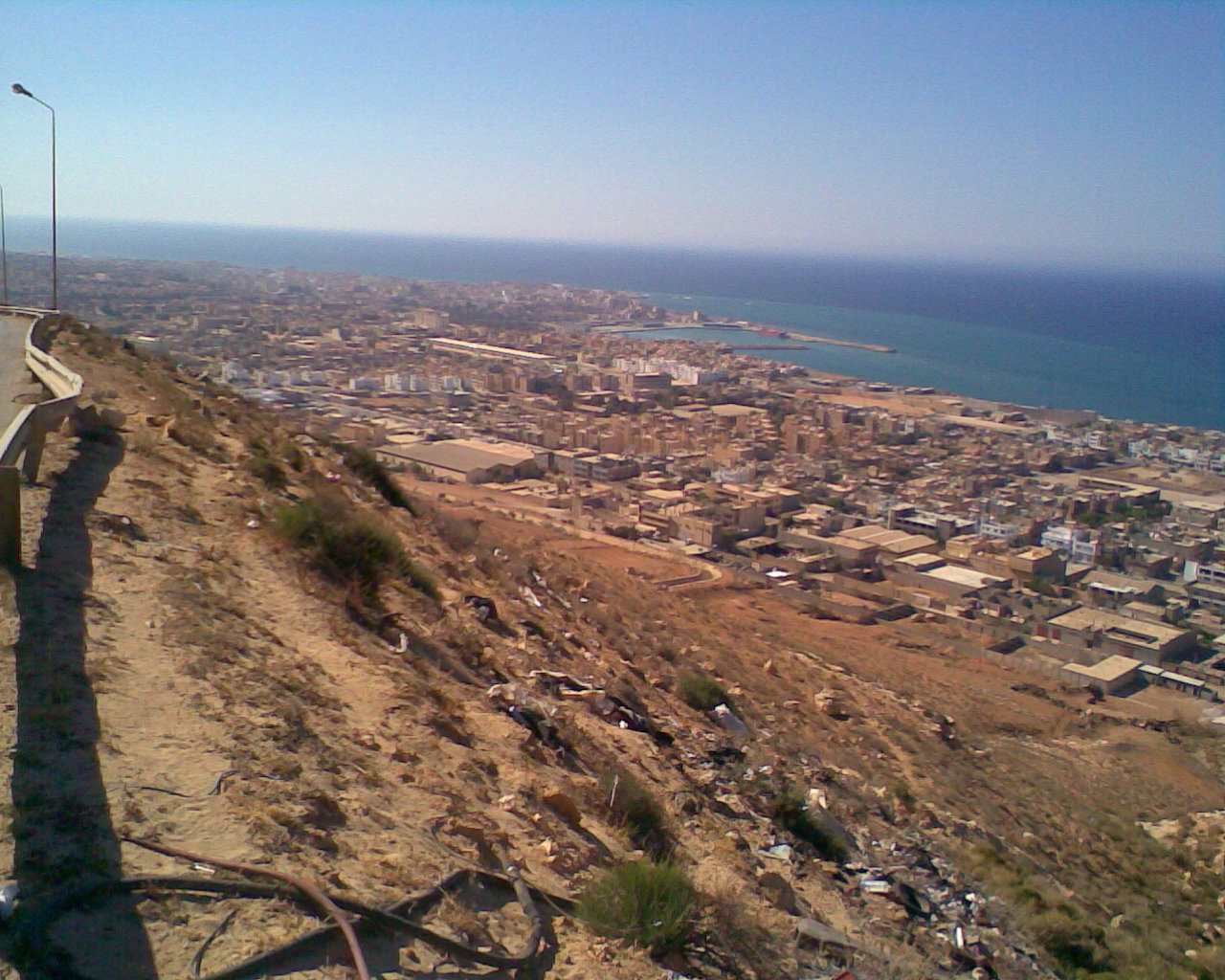
- The view of Derna from a hilltop
Date	5 October 2014 – 21 April 2016 (1 year, 6 months, 2 weeks and 2 days) (ISIL presence since early 2014)
Location	Derna, Libya
Result	Shura Council of Mujahideen in Derna victory
Territorial changes	ISIL militants capture parts of Derna and begin operating courts, schools, radio and administrative facilities.; The Libyan government captures villages and roads leading to Derna and implements a naval blockade of the city, while carrying out occasional airstrikes.; Egypt carries out airstrikes in February 2015, in response to ISIL's beheading of 21 Egyptian Christians.; Clashes erupt between the Shura Council of Mujahideen in Derna and ISIL in June 2015, with ISIL being expelled from the city by late July 2015, but ISIL again entered Derna in December 2015.; ISIL began redeploying forces from its positions on the outskirts of Derna to other parts of Libya in April 2016.

Belligerents
Libya; Egypt (airstrikes); United States (airstrikes)	Islamic State of Iraq and the Levant	Shura Council of Mujahideen in Derna Al-Qaeda in the Islamic Maghreb

Commanders and leaders
Khalifa Haftar (Field Marshal of the Libyan National Army); Aguila Saleh Issa (President of the Libyan House of Representatives); Brig. Gen. Saqr Geroushi (Commander of the Libyan Air Force); Air Mshl Younes Hamed (Commander of the Egyptian Air Force): Abu Abdul Rahman al-Makki (Commander and Shaykh of the Ayn Marah Martyrs Brigade)	Abu Bakr al-Baghdadi (Leader of ISIL); Abu Nabil al-Anbari † (ISIL commander of North Africa) Mohammed Abdullah (Top ISIL judge in Derna); Salah Benali † (Shura Council of Islamic Youth leader in Derna); Sofian Qumu (POW) (Senior ISIL commander)	Salim Derby † (Leader of the Abu Salim Martyrs Brigade) Hassan al-Mansouri † (Commander of the Shura Council of Mujahideen in Derna); Hussam al-Nawaisri † (former leader of the Shura Council of Mujahideen in Derna)

Units involved
Libya: Libyan Air Force; Libyan Army; Ayn Marah Martyrs Brigade; Egypt: Egyptian Air Force	Military of the Islamic State: Islamic State - Libya Province	Abu Salim Martyrs Brigade

Strength
Unknown	1,100 fighters	Over 1,100 fighters

Casualties and losses
LNA: 14 fighters executed in Sabha; Several militiamen deserted	83+ fighters killed 20 fighters injured 55 fighters captured 6 fighters sentenced to death and executed	SCMD: 8 killed (Battle against LNA); 13 killed and 48 wounded (Battle against ISIL at Kurfat Sebaa)
- 3 civilians executed by ISIL forces: 2 journalists executed

In October 2014, the self-declared Islamic State of Iraq and the Levant (ISIL) took control of numerous government buildings, security vehicles and local landmarks in the Eastern Libyan coastal city of Derna. Although some media outlets reported the control as being absolute, rival groups like the al-Qaeda-affiliated Abu Salim Martyrs Brigade continued to control parts of the city. Clashes erupted between ISIL and an alliance of Islamist groups in June 2015, with ISIL retreating from Derna to outlying suburbs the following month. However, clashes continued between the Islamist alliance and the Tobruk-based government forces.

== Background ==
The city of Derna has a history of Islamic radicalism. In 2007, American troops in Iraq uncovered a list of foreign fighters for the Iraqi insurgency and of the 112 Libyans on the list, 52 had come from Derna. Derna contributed more foreign fighters per capita to al-Qaeda in Iraq than any city in the Middle East and the city has also been a major source of fighters in the Syrian civil war and escalation of the Iraqi insurgency, with 800 fighters from Derna joining ISIL.

== Events ==
=== ISIL takeover of Derna ===
On 5 October 2014, the ISIL-linked militant factions came together and pledged allegiance to ISIL. After the pledging ceremony, more than 60 pickup trucks filled with fighters cruised through the city in a victory parade. A second more formal gathering took place on 30 October, where militants gathered to pledge allegiance to Abu Bakr al-Baghdadi in the city square, where a handmade bomb was detonated.

=== Libyan airstrikes and planned assault ===
On 12 November 2014, Libyan Air Force fighter jets carried out airstrikes in Derna, possibly in retaliation for the car bombs, which exploded in Benghazi, Tobruk and the Labraq Airport. Six ISIL militants were killed and 20 militants were wounded. According to Human Rights Watch, some residents have fled the city in advance of an announced Libyan Armed Forces assault on Derna. Approval for a Libyan Army ground assault on Derna was given on 6 December 2014 and army units moved within a few kilometers of Derna, retaking control of villages and roads leading to the city. From December 2014, US drones and electronic surveillance planes began making "constant flights" from Italian bases over Derna. On 25 March 2015, the Tobruk-based government announced it was launching an offensive on the city of Derna, to expel ISIL and other militant groups from the city.

=== Egyptian military airstrikes ===
On 15 February 2015, the Islamic State in Libya released a video depicting the beheading of 21 Coptic Christians from Egypt. Within hours, the Egyptian Air Force responded with airstrikes against IS training locations and weapons stockpiles, killing 50 militants in Derna. Warplanes acting under orders from the "official" Libyan government also struck targets in Derna, reportedly in coordination with Egypt's airstrikes. A Libyan official stated that more joint airstrikes would follow.

=== 2015–2016 Battle of Derna ===
In March 2015, the Libyan National Army, affiliated with the Tobruk-based government, began to implement a siege of the city of Derna, in preparation for a future offensive on the city. However, by May 2015, the operation had stalled due to disputes between commanders and affiliated tribes.

The Shura Council of Mujahideen in Derna, an umbrella organisation of Derna-based Islamist factions opposed to ISIL, launched an offensive against ISIL in June 2015, following its involvement in the killing of two of their leaders. After days of clashes, they were able to push ISIL out of large portions of the city, but clashes continued between them and the Tobruk-based government forces. By July 2015, the last ISIL militants in Derna were expelled from the city, withdrawing to al-Fatayeh on the outskirt where they continued to clash with the Derna Shura Council. Taking advantage of ISIL's collapse in the city, the Shura Council began to impose their own rule and Libyan Army forces attempted to advance on the city. Following continued clashes, ISIL retreated from al-Fatayeh and positions in Derna's outskirts in April 2016, reportedly to the group's stronghold in Sirte.

=== U.S. airstrike ===
The United States launched an airstrike at Derna on 13 November 2015, targeting senior ISIL leader Abu Nabil al-Anbari. Abu Nabil had previously led jihadist operations between Fallujah and Ramadi from 2004 to 2010 before relocating to Libya on the orders of Abu Bakr al-Baghdadi. It was the first military action against ISIL by the United States outside of Syria and Iraq. The Libya Herald reported that Abu Nabil al-Anbari was not killed in the airstrike, however a eulogy to Abu Nabil al-Anbari was published online by a member of ISIL some weeks later and an interview with his replacement was published in an ISIL magazine in March 2016.

== See also ==
- List of wars and battles involving ISIL
- American intervention in Libya (2015–2019)
- 2015 Corinthia Hotel attack
- Fall of Nofaliya (2015)
- February 2015 Egyptian airstrikes in Libya
- Battle of Sirte (2015)
