= Sirte District =

District of Libya

Coordinates: 31°12′17.41″N 16°35′16.54″E

Sirte سرت
- District
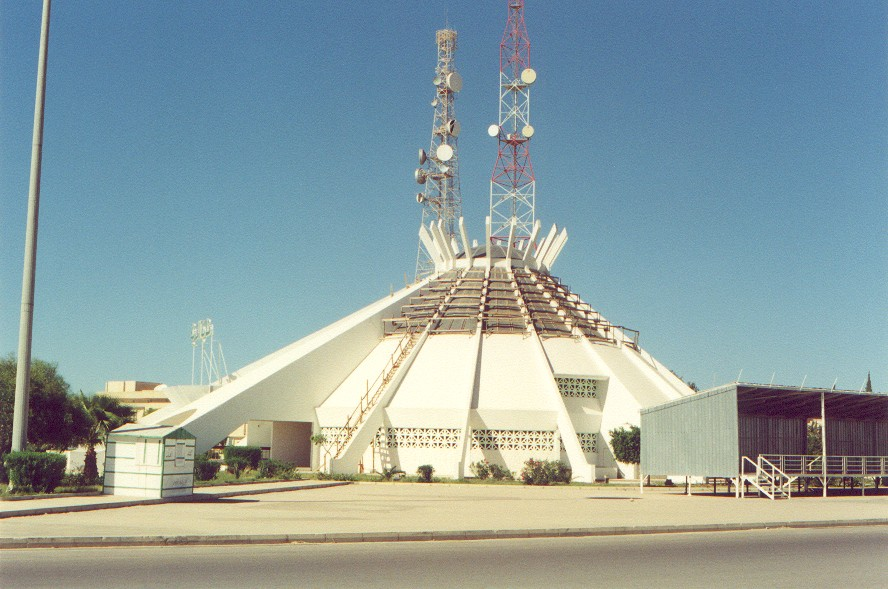

- Map of Libya with Sirte district highlighted
- Country: Libya
- Capital: Sirte

Area
  - Total: 77,660 km^{2} (29,980 sq mi)

Population (2006)
  - Total: 141,378
  - Density: 1.820/km^{2} (4.715/sq mi)
- License Plate Code: 7, 51

Sirte District (or Sirt or Surt District; Arabic: سرت Surt,), is one of the districts of Libya, in the Tripolitania region in the north of the country and borders the Gulf of Sidra. Its capital is the city of Sirte. Al-Tahadi University is located in Sirte. To the north, Sirte District has a shoreline on the Mediterranean Sea and is bordered by Al Wahat in the east, Jufra in the south, Jabal al Gharbi in the west and Misrata in the northwest.

Per the census of 2012, the total population in the region was 157,747 with 150,353 Libyans. The average size of the household in the country was 6.9, while the average household size of non-Libyans being 3.7. There were totally 22,713 households in the district, with 20,907 Libyan ones. The population density of the district was 1.86 persons per km^{2}.

== Geography ==
The boundaries of Sirte district have changed several times, most recently in the 2007 administrative reorganization of Libyan districts (see maps). From 1983 to 1987 the Bin Jawad District covered parts of what is now part of Sirte District. To the north, Sirte District has a shoreline on the Mediterranean Sea. As of 2007, on land, it bordered the following districts, namely, Al Wahat in the east, Jufra in the south, Jabal al Gharbi in the west and Misrata in the northwest. Sirte is an interim destination of a coastal railway from Tunisia to Benghazi that began construction in 2007. Sirte is a part of Triplotania geographical region of Libya that runs from north to south and has set of coastal oases, plains and limestone plateaus having an elevation of 2,000 ft (610 m) to 3,000 ft (910 m). The region receives an annual rainfall of 16 in (410 mm). There are no perennial rivers in the region, but the region is abundant with groundwater aquifers. Libya has mostly a flat undulating plain and occasional plateau, with an average elevation of around 423 m (1,388 ft). Around 91 per cent of the land is covered by desert, with only 8.8 per cent agricultural land (with only 1% arable lands) and 0.1 per cent of forests. Along the coastal regions, the climate is Mediterranean, while it is desert climate in all other parts. Dust storms lasting four to eight days is pretty common during Spring. Triplotania is the northwest region, while it is Cyrenacia in the east and Fezzen in southwest.

Climate data for Surt
| Month | Jan | Feb | Mar | Apr | May | Jun | Jul | Aug | Sep | Oct | Nov | Dec | Year |
|---|---|---|---|---|---|---|---|---|---|---|---|---|---|
| Mean daily maximum °C (°F) | 17 (62) | 18 (64) | 20 (68) | 22 (72) | 24 (76) | 27 (81) | 28 (83) | 29 (85) | 29 (84) | 27 (80) | 22 (72) | 18 (65) | 23 (74) |
| Mean daily minimum °C (°F) | 11 (51) | 11 (52) | 13 (55) | 16 (60) | 18 (65) | 21 (70) | 23 (74) | 24 (75) | 23 (73) | 21 (69) | 16 (60) | 12 (54) | 17 (63) |
| Average precipitation mm (inches) | 38 (1.5) | 23 (0.9) | 13 (0.5) | 5.1 (0.2) | 2.5 (0.1) | 0 (0) | 0 (0) | 0 (0) | 10 (0.4) | 23 (0.9) | 25 (1) | 43 (1.7) | 190 (7.3) |
Source: Weatherbase

== Demographics ==
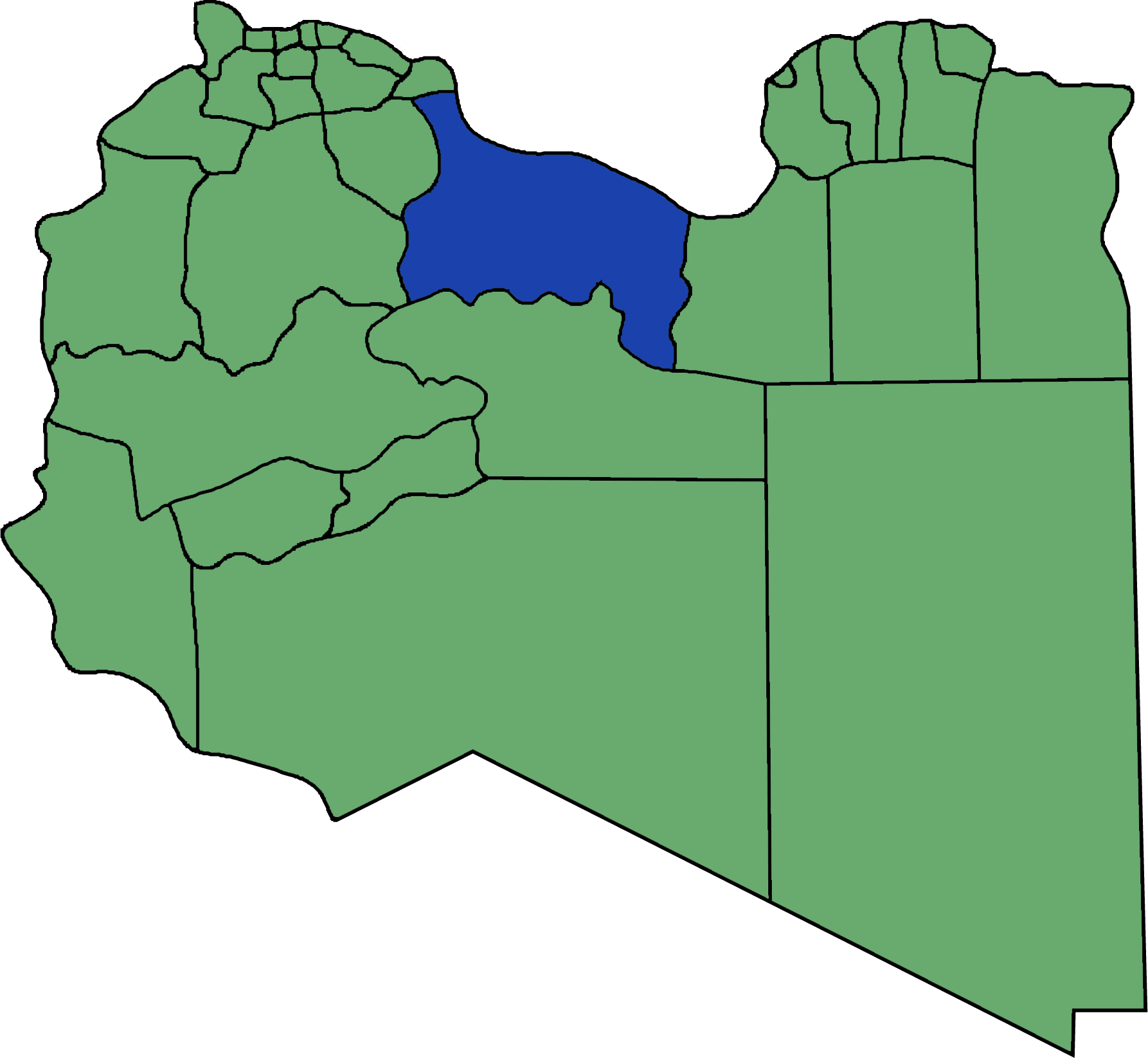
Location of Sirte District from 2001 until 2007, under the 32-shabiyat system.

Per the census of 2012, the total population in the region was 157,747 with 150,353 Libyans. The average size of the household in the country was 6.9, while the average household size of non-Libyans being 3.7. There were totally 22,713 households in the district, with 20,907 Libyan ones. The population density of the district was 1.86 persons per km^{2}. Per 2006 census, there were totally 40,914 economically active people in the district. There were 16,548 government employees, 4,360 employers, 18,303 first level workers and 215 second level workers. There were 7,222 workers in state administration, 4,864 in agriculture, animal husbandry and forestry, 5,126 in agriculture & hunting, 6,803 in education, 6,341 in private enterprises, 1,500 in health & social work, 2,833 in production, 8,037 in technical work and 448 service workers. The total enrollment in schools was 51,336 and the number of people above secondary stage and less than graduation was 2,740. As per the report from World Health Organization (WHO), there were one communicable disease centres, five dental clinics, one general clinics, two in-patient clinics, six out-patient clinics, 45 pharmacies, 42 PHC centres, one polyclinic, one rural clinics and no specialized clinics.

== Administration ==
Sirte District shares its name with the city of Sirte, the historically most important city on the Gulf of Sidra. These names derive from the Greek name for the gulf, the Great Syrtis. Libya became independent in 1951 from the colonial empire and generally known for its oil rich resources. As a part of decentralization in 2012, the country is administratively split into 13 regions from the original 25 municipalities, which were further divided in 1,500 communes. As of 2016, there were 22 administrative divisions in the country in the form of districts.
