= Libi =

Libi may refer to:

== People ==
- Libi (name), Jewish given name
- Al Libi, Arabic surname
- Abd al-Muhsin Al-Libi (born 1966), Islamic terrorist
- Abdullah Said al Libi, Islamic terrorist
- Abu Anas al-Libi, Islamic terrorist
- Abu Faraj al-Libbi, Islamic terrorist
- Abu Habib al-Libi, Islamic terrorist
- Abu Laith al-Libi (1967–2008), Islamic terrorist
- Abu Yahya al-Libi (1963-2012), Islamic terrorist
- Ibn al-Shaykh al-Libi, Islamic terrorist
- Katiba al-Bittar al-Libi, Islamic terrorist
- Libi Haim (born 1984), Israeli volleyball player
- Libi Staiger, American actress
- Luqman al-Libi, Islamic terrorist
- Ben Ali Libi, also known as Michel Velleman, Dutch magician

== Places ==
- Libi, Chongqing, China
- Libi, Logone Oriental (region), Chad
- Libi, Malapatan, Philippines
- Libi, North Region (Cameroon)
- Libi, Ombella-M'Poko, Central African Republic
- Libi, Orientale Province, Democratic Republic of Congo
- Libi, South Region (Cameroon)
- Libi, Woleu-Ntem Province, Gabon
