= Al Libi =

Al Liby (اللّيبي, 'the Libyan'), or variations, is a surname, alias or nom-de-guerre used by several individuals from Libya. Variations include al Libi, al-Libi, al-Liby and al-Libby. People with the name include:

- Abd al-Muhsin Al-Libi (Ibrahim Tantoush), an alleged Libyan Al-Qaeda leader, indicted by the U.S.
- Abdel Wahab Qaid, or Abu Idris al-Libi, Libyan politician and former militia leader
- Abdullah Said al Libi, al Qaeda's operations planner for Pakistan, killed by a drone in 2009
- Abu Anas al-Liby (Nazih Abdul-Hamed Nabih al-Ruqai'i), indicted for the 1998 East Africa embassy bombings, died in U.S. custody in 2015
- Abu Faraj al-Libbi (Mustafa Faraj Muhammad Muhammad Masud al-Jadid al-Uzaybi), alleged Al-Qaeda leader, held at Guantanamo Bay, Cuba
- Abu Habib al-Libi, or Abu Habib al-Libi, senior Islamic State leader in Iraq and Libya
- Abu Laith al-Libi (Ali Ammar Ashur al-Rufayi,), senior figure in al Qaeda, reportedly killed in a drone strike in 2008
- Abu Yahya al-Libi (Mohamed Hassan Qaid), leading official of al Qaeda, escaped from detention in Bagram, killed by a drone in 2012
- Ibn al-Shaykh al-Libi (Ali Mohamed Abdul Aziz al-Fakheri), who provided the source of US claims used to support the 2003 Iraq war, died by suicide in prison in 2009
- Katiba al-Bittar al-Libi, Islamic terrorist
- Salem Abdul Salem Ghereby, or Luqman al-Libi, held in Guantanamo 2002–2016
