= Cairo Declaration =

Cairo Declaration may refer to:

- 1943 Cairo Declaration, outline of the Allied position against Japan during World War II
- Cairo Declaration, from a 1964 summit of the Organisation of African Unity
- Cairo Declaration on Human Rights in Islam, adopted in 1990 by the Organisation of the Islamic Conference
- Cairo Declaration, from a 1993 summit of the Organisation of African Unity
- Cairo Declaration, a 1997 attempt at reconciliation in Somalia
- Palestinian Cairo Declaration, a 2005 agreement among Palestinian factions
- Cairo Declaration, a 2008 Arab agreement to create the Regional Center for Renewable Energy and Energy Efficiency
- 2017 Cairo Declaration,
- 2020 Cairo Declaration, a proposed ceasefire in the Second Libyan Civil War
- Cairo Declaration (film), a 2015 Chinese historical film
