= Libby (disambiguation) =

Libby is a given name and a surname. It may also refer to:

== Places ==
=== United States ===
- Libby, Minnesota, an unincorporated community
- Libby Township, Aitkin County, Minnesota
- Libby, Montana, a city
- Libby, Oregon, an unincorporated community
- Libby Army Airfield, in Sierra Vista, Arizona
- Libby Creek (Wyoming), Wyoming
- Libby Creek (Washington), Washington
- Libby Islands, two islands in Machias Bay, Maine
- Libby Prison, a Confederate prison in Richmond, Virginia, during the American Civil War

=== Outer space ===
- 5672 Libby, an asteroid

== Other uses ==
- Libby station, Libby, Montana, a railway station
- Libby Dam, a dam on the Kootenai River in Montana
- Libby High School, Montana, on the National Register of Historic Places
- Libby (service), a library app by OverDrive, Inc.
- Libby's, an American food company founded in 1869, now part of ConAgra Foods and Nestlé Worldwide

== See also ==
- Libbey (disambiguation)
