= Libby =

Libby as a feminine given name is typically a diminutive form of Elizabeth, which is less commonly spelled 'Libbie' or 'Libi'.

In recent years, it has been used as a shortened version of the name Liberty.

It also approximates "my heart" in Hebrew, and is a common Jewish given name as well as surname, in this case often a diminutive of Leibowitz. It became popular in Israel due to a character in a series of novels for young teenagers by author Hadas Leibowitz and due to its use in the Israeli song Achoti Haktana or My Little Sister.

As a surname, it can also be spelled Libbey.

Libby or Libbie may refer to:

== People with the name ==
=== Given name ===
==== Libby or Libbie ====
- Libby Birch (born 1997), Australian footballer
- Libby Davies (born 1953), Canadian member of parliament
- Libby Gill (born 1954), American motivational writer, speaker and coach
- Libby Gleeson (born 1950), Australian writer
- Libby Fischer Hellmann, American crime fiction writer
- Libbie Hickman (born 1965), American former long-distance runner
- Libbie Hyman (1888–1969), American zoologist
- Libby Larsen (born 1950), American classical composer
- Libby Morris (born 1930), Canadian comic actress
- Libby Munro (born 1981), Australian actress
- Libby Potter, British reporter
- Libby Rees (born 1995), British author
- Libby Riddles (born 1956), first woman to win the Iditarod Trail Sled Dog Race
- Libby Szabo, American politician, member of the Colorado House of Representatives since 2011

==== Elizabeth or Lisbeth ====
- Libby Clegg (born 1990), Scottish Paralympic sprinter
- Elizabeth Bacon Custer (1842–1933), wife of General George Armstrong Custer, nicknamed "Libbie"
- Libbie Janse van Rensburg (born 1994), South African rugby union and sevens player
- Libby Hakaraia, New Zealand film producer and director
- Libby Hathorn (born 1943), Australian writer and poet
- Libby Holman (1904–1971), American torch singer and actress
- Libby Lane (born 1966), British Anglican bishop
- Libby Mettam (born 1977), Australian politician elected 2014, former journalist
- Libby Mitchell (born 1940), American politician
- Libby Pataki (born 1950), wife of former New York Governor George Pataki
- Libby Purves (born 1950), British journalist
- Libby Roderick (born c. 1958), American singer/songwriter, poet and activist
- Libbie Schrader, American singer-songwriter
- Libby Tanner (born 1970), Australian actress
- Libby Thompson (1855–1953), American prostitute, dance hall girl and madam
- Libby Titus (born 1947), American singer/songwriter born Elizabeth Jurist
- Libby Trickett (born 1985), Australian world-record holding swimmer and Olympic champion
- Elizabeth "Libby" Woods (born 1960), Australian magistrate and basketball administrator

=== Surname ===
- Aaron Libby (born 1983), American politician
- Bill Libby (1927–1984), American sports author
- Charles Libby (1844–1915), American politician and lawyer
- Charles Thornton Libby (1861–1948), American author, historian, genealogist and lawyer
- Frederick Libby (1891–1970), first American flying ace of World War I
- George D. Libby (1919–1950), U.S. Army soldier who received the Medal of Honor
- Jake Libby (born 1993), English cricketer
- Nate Libby, American politician, member of the Maine House of Representatives beginning 2012
- Scooter Libby (born 1950), former chief of staff (2001–2005) to Vice President Dick Cheney
- Willard Libby (1908–1980), American chemist
- Grace Libby Vollmer (1884–1977), née Libby, American painter.

== Fictional characters ==
- Libby (Lost), a minor character on the television drama Lost
- Libby, Jonah's brief girlfriend who is also deaf in Disney Channel series Andi Mack
- Libby, from the 2015 Pixar film The Good Dinosaur
- Libby Chessler, antagonist on the ABC/WB sitcom Sabrina, the Teenage Witch
- Libby Folfax, a female black character on the Nickelodeon animated television series The Adventures of Jimmy Neutron, Boy Genius and the 2001 film Jimmy Neutron: Boy Genius
- Libby Fox, in the British soap opera EastEnders
- Libby Jeffries, in the New Zealand soap opera Shortland Street
- Libby Kennedy, in the Australian soap opera Neighbours
- Libby Lawrence, a DC Comics superheroine, the first Liberty Belle (character)
- Andrew Jackson Libby, a recurring character in Robert A. Heinlein's Future History series
- Libbie the Cyber Oryx, a proposed mascot submitted in LibreOffice's mascot competition
- Libby Masters, wife of the main character in the television show Masters of Sex
- Libby, a character in the animated television series Grojband
- Libby Stein-Torres, a recurring character in Disney Channel series The Ghost and Molly McGee
- Kate Libby, one of the main characters in Hackers (1995) played by Angelina Jolie

== Commercial ==
- Libby (service), a major digital library application
- Libby's, a canned food brand

== Places ==
- Libby, Montana
- Libby Prison, US Civil War prison

== See also ==
- Senator Libby (disambiguation)
