= Libbey =

Libbey may refer to:

== Surname ==
- Artemas Libbey (1823–1894), American jurist
- Dee Libbey (1919–1988), American composer
- Edward Libbey (1854–1925), American founder of Libbey Glass Company
- Harry Libbey (1843–1913), American politician
- J. Aldrich Libbey (1864–1925), American vaudeville performer, actor, singer and songwriter
- Laura Jean Libbey (1862–1924), American writer
- Neil Libbey, American-born author and historian in Nova Scotia
- William Libbey (1855–1927), American professor of physical geography
- Miriam Hawkins Libbey (1921–1984), American medical librarian

== Other uses ==
- Libbey Incorporated, a glass product manufacturer in Toledo, Ohio
- Libbey High School, a public high school in Toledo, Ohio
- Edward D. Libbey House, a National Historic Landmark in Toledo, Ohio

== See also ==
- Libbey-Owens-Ford, an American glass company
- Libby (disambiguation)
