= Libi (name) =

Libi is a modern Jewish name (ליבי) according to various baby name sites. It is derived from the plural of the Hebrew word 'lev' (heart), which is 'libbot', leading it to be described as meaning "my heart". It is also occasionally spelled Libby. Alternatively, it has been listed as meaning "loved one", most likely deriving from Yiddish and the German word 'liebe'.

Libi is also rarely used as a variant of Libby, a diminutive of Elizabeth.

Libi in Arabic means 'Libyan' and is typically used as part of a surname for people of Libyan origin, al-Libi.

== Given name ==
- Libi Haim (born 1984), Israeli volleyball player
- Elizabeth 'Libi' Staiger, American actress

== Surname ==
- Ben Ali Libi, also known as Michel Velleman, Dutch magician
