= 2017 Cairo Declaration =

Sudan People's Liberation Movement (SPLM) Declaration of Unification
- Type: Peace Treaty
- Context: Part of a series of peace agreements between the SPLM and the SPLM-IO seeking resolution to the South Sudanese Civil War
- Signed: 16 November 2017
- Location: General Intelligence's HQ, Cairo, Egypt
- Signatories: (South Sudan) (SPLM-IG) Kuol Manyang (South Sudan) (SPLM-FDS) Pagan Amum Okiech (South Sudan) (SPLM-IO) Taban Deng Gai
- Parties: South Sudan; Uganda; Egypt

The 2017 Cairo Declaration (also known as SPLM Declaration of Unification) was signed on November 16, 2017, at the Egyptian General Intelligence's headquarters in Cairo, Egypt.

== Overview ==
The document was an attempt with the aim to unite and end the SPLM civil war in South Sudan, including the return of refugees and displaced persons to their areas of origin.

== Declaration ==
The declaration was signed on 16 November 2017 at the end of 3-days meetings in Cairo.

== Measures ==
- Start the process 2015 Arusha reunification agreement
- The SPLM will no longer recognize Riek Machar as the leader of the SPLM-IO faction, but will have an opportunity to join the IGAD-led reunification process.

=== Signatories and attendees ===
President Abdel Fatah al-Sisi of Egypt, President Yoweri Kaguta Museveni of Uganda were present.

The document was signed by:

- President of Egypt and Egyptian representative Abdel Fatah al-Sisi
- President of Uganda and Ugandan representative Yoweri Kaguta Museveni
- Defence Minister of South Sudan and South Sudanese SPLM-IG representative Kuol Manyang
- Leader of Former Detainees and South Sudanese SPLM-FDS representative Pagan Amum Okiech
- First Vice President of South Sudan and South Sudanese SPLM-IO representative Taban Deng Gai

== International Reactions ==
- (South Sudan) - Former First Vice President and Leader of SPLM-In Opposition, Riek Machar: Denounced the SPLM reunification agreement signed in Cairo and called to end his confinement in South Africa.
- (Yemen) - Yemeni Ambassador, Mohammed Ali Maram: Praised the vital role played by Egypt in settling the South Sudan bloody conflicts that led to many deaths and left others internally and externally displaced.
