= 2020 Cairo Declaration =

The 2020 Cairo Declaration, announced on June 6, 2020, was a proposed Second Libyan Civil War ceasefire drawn up in Cairo between Egypt's Abdel Fattah el-Sisi and leaders associated with the Libyan National Army, including Khalifa Haftar and Aguila Saleh. The Libyan national army's principal opposition in the civil war was the UN-recognized Government of National Accord. The declaration proposed to cease all hostilities from June 8, 2020, withdraw all foreign troops and mercenaries, and to disarm the population and hand all weapons over to the Libyan National Army, and to then hold national elections.

== Background ==
The Libyan National Army (LNA) had been pressing for 18 months in an offensive to take the capital city of Tripoli. However, initial successes were largely undone and they were now being pressed by Government of National Accord (GNA) in multiple directions. The LNA was backed by Egypt and other Arab nations, whilst the GNA was backed by Turkey, who had recently increased its support and had begun installing a military base.

== Reactions ==
=== Domestic Reactions ===
- Libya - Shortly after the proposal was declared, it was rejected by the GNA.

=== International Reactions ===
- Algeria - The spokesperson for the President of Algeria, Belaid Mohand Oussaid, said that Algeria welcomed the Cairo Declaration aimed at a political solution to the Libyan crisis and the cessation of hostilities.
- Bahrain - In a phone call with the Egyptian President, The King of Bahrain Hamad bin Isa Al Khalifa affirmed his support for the initiative aimed at achieving security and stability in Libya and stop foreign interventions therein.
- France - French President Emmanuel Macron welcomed the initiative, noting the importance of reaching a political solution compatible with the relevant United Nations resolutions and international efforts.
- Germany - In a phone call with the Egyptian President, German Chancellor Angela Merkel praised the Egyptian Constructive efforts to settle the Libyan crisis.
- Kuwait - In an official statement, the Ministry of Foreign Affairs welcomed the initiative presented by Egyptian President Abdel-Fattah al-Sisi for peace in Libya and that its support for the Egyptian initiative comes in line with its support for the initiative of the UN Secretary-General for a nationwide ceasefire that was announced last March.
- Jordan - Jordan's Foreign Minister Ayman Safadi said that the Kingdom appreciates the Egyptian efforts that resulted in the Cairo Declaration and described the initiative as “an important achievement", and has stressed that it represents an initiative consistent with international initiatives, and that "it must be supported to reach a political solution to the Libyan crisis that protects Libya, its unity, and its stability through a Libyan dialogue."
- Russia - In a phone call with his Egyptian counterpart, Russian President Vladimir Putin praised the Cairo Declaration Initiative in terms of its launch date and the comprehensive framework that provides an integrated and constructive proposal to settle the crisis.
- Saudi Arabia - In an official statement, Saudi Arabia said that it welcomed the efforts made by Egypt aimed at resolving the conflict in Libya adding that the Kingdom urged both sides to immediately begin UN-sponsored peace negotiations.
- South Africa - In a phone call with his Egyptian counterpart, South African President Cyril Ramaphosa asserted that the initiative comes in consistent with the African Union efforts in Libya which aims at settling the Libyan crisis peacefully.
- Turkey - Turkish Foreign Minister Mevlut Cavusoglu dismissed the proposal as an attempt to save Haftar following the losses he suffered on the battlefield.
- United Arab Emirates - In a statement by the Ministry of Foreign Affairs and International Cooperation, the UAE commended "the determination of Cairo to spare the blood of the Libyan people and pave the way to initiate a comprehensive political process."
- United Kingdom - The United Kingdom's Foreign_and_Commonwealth_Office James Cleverly tweeted that he welcomes efforts by Egypt to encourage eastern Libyan leaders to support a ceasefire, and has affirmed that the "Libyan National Army & Government of National Accord need to engage urgently in the UN’s 5+5 talks, the path to an inclusive solution."
- United States - The United States Embassy in Libya welcomed "efforts by Egypt and others to support a return to the UN-led political negotiations and the declaration of a ceasefire", and has "called on all sides to participate in good faith to halt the fighting and return to the UN-led political negotiations."
