= Miriam Hawkins Libbey =

American medical librarian

Miriam Hawkins Libbey in 1977.

Miriam Hawkins Libbey (c. 1920-1984) was an American medical librarian. She served as the fourth director of the Emory University's A. W. Calhoun Medical Library, now called the Emory University Woodruff Health Sciences Center Library, from 1966 to 1984. In 1984, Libbey was named a fellow of the Medical Library Association for her contributions to the association and the profession of medical librarianship. In 1991, a memorial lecture was named after her by the Georgia Health Sciences Library Association.

== Early life and education ==
Miriam Libbey née Hawkins was born in Loganville, Georgia. She received her B.A. from Shorter College in 1942 and her Master's in Librarianship from Emory University in 1950.

She began her first professional job as a reference librarian at the Emory University's A. W. Calhoun Medical Library from 1950 to 1955. Libbey was also one of the first students to attend Mildred M. Jordan’s course on medical librarianship, established in 1951 as the second such program available in the country.

== Career ==
Libbey left Emory in 1955 and joined the Army Medical Library, where she worked in the reference division and as the Head of Special Projects until 1963. While at the Armed Forces Medical Library, she participated in a medical collection symposium that obligated the National Library of Medicine towards medical literature. The position paper was paralleled with obligations for access and preserving medical information in libraries serving academic centers, hospitals, medical societies, and the public. Libbey argued it was the responsibility of the national medical library to collect all materials within their subject areas, including those considered to be unorthodox, pseudoscience, and popular belief, regardless of their veracity or acceptance by established medical doctrines.

In 1963, Libbey transitioned to a role in the Health Sciences Library at the State University of New York. While there, she formed the Task Force on Automation with librarians Irwin Pizer and Helen Kovacs. This partnership attracted collaborations with IBM and the National Library of Medicine, eventual launching the works first online bibliographic information retrieval system, known more modernly as an online library catalog.

In 1966, Miriam Libbey returned to Emory University as the director of the A.W. Calhoun Library, following the death of Jordan. As director, Libbey fought to establish Emory as the regional medical library under the new National Library of Medicine structure (formally the Armed Forces Medical Library) and was subsequently designated the first Director of the Southeastern Regional Medical Library Program (SERMLP). Libbey continued to work for the growth of computers and automation in her role at Emory. In a 1966 description on the growth of biomedical communication in graduate education, Libbey is mentioned for her seminar on Medicine and Health within the Emory University School of Medicine, which offered a focus on bibliographic reference tools and health methods related to emerging computer techniques.

== Curricula activism ==
Miriam Libbey was involved in attempts to define and credential the profession of medical librarianship through her life-long work with the Medical Library Association (MLA). She advocated for standardization of a medical library curriculum and professional credentialing. Libbey was also among the 21 instructors (and 7 women) offering approved professional courses in medical librarianship according to a 1968 nation-wide inventory. Her dedication to instruction and professional mentorship remained a common theme among her students.

In 1965, the U.S. Congress passed the Medical Library Assistance Act intend to create collaboration between medical schools, research centers, hospitals through the establishment of the Regional Medical Library Programs (RML). In 1967, Libbey wrote how she believed that the RML programs laid a path for increased professionalization of medical librarians through the establishment of continuing education opportunities on emerging technologies; she mentioned a belief in a future need for programmers and machine experts in medical libraries to address the changing nature of information and communications. This writing would become one of the most cited position papers on the medical library credentialing program and would eventually come to inform the current Academy of Health Information Professionals (AHIP).

== Legacy ==
Libbey was elected as a Fellow of the Medical Library Association in 1984. In 1991, the Georgia Health Sciences Library Association created an annual lecture series in her name aimed at honoring Libbey's visions for the future of medical librarianship.

== Bibliography ==
- Libbey, MH (1967). "MLA certification: the certification program and education for medical librarianship". Bull Med Libr Assoc. 55 (1): 5–8. PMC 198486. PMID 6016371.
- "Proceedings, Sixty-second Annual Meeting Medical Library Association, Inc., and Second International Congress on Medical Librarianship Washington, D. C. June 16-22, 1963". Bull Med Libr Assoc. 51 (4): 512–71. 1963. PMC 198043. PMID 16017302.
- Hawkins, M (1963). "QUESTIONABLE MEDICAL LITERATURE AND THE LIBRARY: A SYMPOSIUM; THE NATIONAL LIBRARY OF MEDICINE". Bull Med Libr Assoc. 51 (4): 475–9. PMC 198036. PMID 14072679.
- Hawkins, M; Parker, SM (1960). "Scientific translations: sources and services". Bull Med Libr Assoc. 48 (2): 199–202. PMC 200469. PMID 14400261.
- Libbey MH, Moseley E. Basic reference aids for small medical libraries. Washington DC: National Library of Medicine, 1963. OCLC: 379599703
