= Senator Libby =

Senator Libby may refer to:

- Charles Libby (1844–1915), Maine State Senate
- James Libby (born 1960), Maine State Senate
- Nate Libby (born 1985), Maine State Senate
