= Abu Habib al-Libi =

Libyan man

- أبو حبيب الليبي
- Born: Hasan al-Salahayn Salih al-Sha'ari; 1975 (age 50–51); Derna, Libya
- Occupation: Senior Islamic State leader

Hasan al-Salahayn Salih al-Sha'ari (Arabic: حسن الصلاحين صالح الشعري, born 1975), known as Abu Habib al-Libi (Arabic: أبو حبيب الليبي), is a Libyan man who has been a senior Islamic State leader in both Iraq and Libya.

== History ==
He was born in Derna, Libya in 1975.

== Iraq ==
After the 2003 invasion of Iraq, he traveled from Libya to Iraq via Syria to fight coalition forces. He was a member of Al-Qaeda in Iraq since at least 2004 and was an associate of Abu Umar al-Tunisi since then. According to a description given by the United States Department of the Treasury, he was personally trained by Abu Musab al-Zarqawi.

He was captured by American forces in Al-Karābilah, Al Anbar Governorate on September 6, 2005. A press release at the time says he admitted to being the improvised explosive device emir of Karabilah, responsible for conducting numerous bombings against Coalition and Iraqi forces.

== Libya ==
In mid-2012 he was freed from jail in Iraq and returned to Libya, where he continued to support IS, starting a branch of IS in Libya in late 2014. He provided Tunisian IS leader Abu Umar al-Tunisi hundreds of thousands of dollars and dispatched experienced, trusted personnel to aid him between late 2012 and early 2013.

By early 2014, he had given his oath of allegiance to IS leader Abu Bakr al-Baghdadi and in late 2014 he was leading IS military convoys in Derna, Libya.

=== US and UN sanctions ===
On 29 September 2015 he was made subject to sanctions by the United States Department of the Treasury. On 29 February 2016 he was sanctioned by the United Nations Security Council.
