= Katiba al-Bittar al-Libi =

Islamist military organization

- كتيبة البيطار الليبية
- Leaders: Abdelhamid Abaaoud †; Abu Dujana Al-Libi †
- Dates active: 2012-2016
- Headquarters: Derna, Libya (2014-2016)
- Active regions: Syria, Iraq, and Libya
- Ideology: Islamism: Salafi Jihadism
- Size: 350-1400
- Part of: Islamic State of Iraq and the Levant (Since 2014)
- Wars: the Syrian Civil War Second Libyan Civil War

Katiba al-Bittar al-Libi was an armed Islamist group operating in Iraq, Syria and Libya. The group is composed largely of Libyan fighters who entered Syria in the wake of the Arab Spring and early post-civil uprising stage of the Syrian Civil War. Though the group is composed largely of Libyans, the group also has large amounts of Tunisians and Francophone Maghrebis from Europe, reportedly the perpetrators of the November 2015 Paris attacks and Manchester Arena bombing, including Abdelhamid Abaaoud, who was suspected to be a leader of the group, were members of the group or affiliated with it, the group also pioneered the Inghimasi tactic used in the attack, and its fighters have largely employed the tactic on the battlefield. The group maintained close ties to Ansar al-Sharia in Tunisia through networks in Libya and has established multiple training camps across Libya and has recruited Tunisians to these camps, which were located around Sirte and Tripoli. During beginning of the infighting between ISIL and its former allies such as Jabhat al-Nusra and Ahrar al-Sham fighters from Katiba al-Bittar took part in open fighting against ISIL's opponents in Markada and Atarib, in the process losing several fighters.

In June 2014 after Abu Bakr al-Baghdadi declared that ISIL had restored the Caliphate in Mosul, the group pledged allegiance to ISIL.

In 2014, the group reportedly sent a delegation from al-Raqqah to Libya and established the Islamic Youth Shura Council in the city of Derna, which would later go on to become ISIL's Cyrenaica Province.
