= Abdullah Said al Libi =

Al-Qaeda member

Abdullah Said al-Libi
- Born: Libya
- Died: December 17, 2009; Pakistan
- Other name: Abdallah Sa'id

Abdullah Said al-Libi (died 17 December 2009) was described as being an al Qaeda operational leader in Pakistan. He is reported to have previously served in the Libyan military. He led an al-Qaeda paramilitary force. Said al-Libi was killed in a drone strike on 17 December 2009 in North Waziristan. In April 2009 he had released a statement where he identified himself as the leader of al Qaeda's efforts to take control of Khorasan - an ancient Islamic province that included Afghanistan, Pakistan, and some neighboring areas.

According to Joby Warrick, the author of The Triple Agent, al Libi had lived with Humam Khalil Abu-Mulal al-Balawi, who would later convince Central Intelligence Agency officers that he was their double agent within al Qaeda, only to detonate a suicide bomb, killing several of them. His suicide bombing is said to have been in retaliation for the killing of al Libi, Abu Saleh al Somali and Baitullah Mehsud.
