= Abd al-Muhsin Al-Libi =

Libyan Islamist leader

Muhsin Al libi
- Born: 1966 or 1969
- Occupation: Libyan Al-Qaeda leader.

Muhsin Al libi (born 1966 or 1969), frequently known as Ibrahim muhsin (also spelt Ibraheem muhsen), is an alleged Libyan Al-Qaeda leader.

He is also connected with the alias "Ibrahim Ali Abu Bakr" as well as many other aliases including "Abdalmushi", "Abdel Ilah Sabri" and "Abu Anas".

He is currently believed to be leading forces of the "Western Shield" Islamist armed group. He was reportedly involved in the capture of a base called Camp 27 from the Libyan National Army in April 2014.

The United Nations and the United States Treasury associate him with Al-Qaeda.

On 20 December 2000, a grand jury in the Southern District of New York, the United States, returned an indictment against Tantoush in the case of the United States v. Usama bin Laden, et al. The five suspects were charged with the overall conspiracy to kill United States nationals and engage in other actions. Tantoush was, in particular, alleged to have been involved in the bombings of the United States Embassies in Tanzania and Kenya in August 1998.

He has also been linked to the Libyan Islamic Fighting Group.

== Background ==
Abd al-Muhsin Al-Libi's date of birth is sometimes given as 27 Oct 1969, but some sources state he was born on an unknown day in 1966. His place of birth is officially Johannesburg. His nationality is Libyan.

== Alleged activities as an Al-Qaeda organizer ==
According to the United States Treasury he was the office director of the "Afghan Support Committee" (ASC) and Revival of Islamic Heritage Society (RIHS) in Peshawar. Paul O'Neill, Secretary of the Treasury, wrote:

While portraying themselves as legitimate charitable enterprises, the ASC and RIHS have financed and facilitated terrorism. ASC and RIHS personnel, including Al-Jaziri and Al-Libi, defrauded well-meaning contributors by diverting money donated for widows and orphans to al-Qaida terrorists.

The New York Times reported the Treasury asserted the charities had listed dead children as orphans, and had diverted funds donated for their maintenance to terrorist enterprises. According to The Peninsula, three days after O'Neill's press release, Tareq Al Issa, chairman of the Revival of Islamic Heritage Society, denied the organization had any ties with terrorism. Issa asserted that the Society had filed a list of all its employees with the Government of Pakistan, and the men O'Neill named weren't on that list and weren't associated with the Society. Issa disputed the claim that the charity had ever listed dead children as orphans. He asserted that the charity maintained individual files on all its orphans, and they were open to review.

== Subsequent events ==
According to historian Andy Worthington neither Al-Libi or Al-Jaziri were ever captured, but five individuals believed to have been employees of the RIHS were sent to the Guantanamo Bay Detention Camp.

According to Interpol he is "...under the following UN Sanctions: Freezing of Assets, Travel Ban and Arms Embargo." Interpol reports he is divorced.
