= Minister of Foreign Affairs (Libya) =

- وزيرة الخارجية

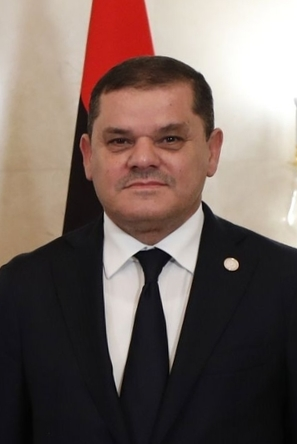
- Incumbent; Abdul Hamid Dbeibeh; Acting since 3 September 2023 (during suspension of Najla El Mangoush)
- Ministry of Foreign Affairs
- Style: Mr. Minister (currently); Miss. Minister (Not at the moment)
- Type: Minister of Foreign Affairs
- Member of: Cabinet of Libya
- Reports to: Prime Minister
- Seat: Tripoli, Libya
- Term length: No fixed term At the Prime Minister's behest
- Formation: 29 March 1951; 75 years ago
- First holder: Ali Jerbi
- Website: www.foreign.gov.ly

This is a list of foreign ministers of Libya.

== Names ==
Title of foreign minister varies depending on political regime. For example, during the Jamahiriya era (1977–2011), the title was Secretary of People's Committee for Foreign Communication and International Cooperation.

== List of foreign ministers ==
=== Libyan provisional government (pre-independence, 1951) ===
Portrait	Name	Lifespan	Term of office	Prime Minister
	Ali Jerbi	1903–1969	29 March 1951 – 24 December 1951	Mahmud al-Muntasir
=== Kingdom of Libya (1951–1969) ===
	Mahmud al-Muntasir	1903–1970	24 December 1951 – 19 February 1954	Mahmud al-Muntasir
	Muhammad Sakizli	1892–1976	19 February 1951 – 11 April 1954	Muhammad Sakizli
	Abdul Salam al-Buseiri	1898–1978	11 April 1954 – 3 December 1954	Mustafa Ben Halim
	Mustafa Ben Halim	1921– 2021	3 December 1954 – 30 October 1956	Mustafa Ben Halim
	Ali Sahli	1924–2004	30 October 1956 – 14 March 1957	Mustafa Ben Halim
	Abdul Majid Kubar (1st time)	1909–1988	14 March 1957 – 26 May 1957	Mustafa Ben Halim
	Wahbi al-Bouri (1st time)	1916–2010	26 May 1956 – 11 October 1958	Abdul Majid Kubar
	Abdul Majid Kubar (2nd time)	1909–1988	11 October 1958 – 16 October 1960	Abdul Majid Kubar
	Abdul Qadir al-Allam	1919–2003	16 October 1960 – 3 May 1961	Muhammad Osman Said
	Suleiman Jerbi	?	3 May 1961 – 27 January 1962	Muhammad Osman Said
	Wanis al-Qaddafi (1st time)	1924–1986	27 January 1962 – 6 March 1963	Muhammad Osman Said
	Omar Mahmud al-Muntasir	1930–1999	6 March 1963 – 19 March 1963	Muhammad Osman Said
	Mohieddin Fikini	1925–1994	19 March 1963 – 22 January 1964	Mohieddin Fikini
	Hussein Maziq	1918–2006	22 January 1964 – 20 March 1965	Mahmud al-Muntasir
	Wahbi al-Bouri (2nd time)	1916–2010	20 March 1965 – 2 October 1965	Hussein Maziq
	Ahmad Bishti	born 1927	2 October 1965 – 4 January 1968	Hussein Maziq (1965–1967); Abdul Qadir al-Badri (1967); Abdul Hamid al-Bakkoush (1967–1968)
	Wanis al-Qaddafi (2nd time)	1924–1986	4 January 1968 – 4 September 1968	Abdul Hamid al-Bakkoush
	Shams ad-Din Orabi	died 2009	4 September 1968 – June 1969	Wanis al-Qaddafi
	Ali Hussnein	1925–2018	June 1969 – 31 August 1969	Wanis al-Qaddafi
=== Libya under Gaddafi (1969–2011) === ==== Libyan Arab Republic (1969–1977) ====
	Salah Busir	1925–1973	1969–1970	Mahmud Suleiman Maghribi
	Mohammed Najm	1943–2016	1970–1972	Muammar Gaddafi
	Mansour Rashid El-Kikhia	1931–c. 1993	1972–1973	Abdessalam Jalloud
	Abdul Monem el Houni	?	1974–1975	Abdessalam Jalloud
	Ali Treki (1st time)	1938–2015	1976–1977	Abdessalam Jalloud
==== Libyan Arab Jamahiriya (1977–2011) ====
Portrait	Name	Lifespan	Term of office	Secretary of General People's Committee
Secretaries of the People's Committee for External Communication
	Ali Treki	1938–2015	1977–1982	Abdul Ati al-Obeidi (1977–1979); Jadallah Azzuz at-Talhi (1979–1982)
	Abdul Ati al-Obeidi (1st time)	1939–2023	1982–1984	Jadallah Azzuz at-Talhi
	Ali Treki (2nd time)	1938–2015	1984–1986	Muhammad az-Zaruq Rajab
	Kamel Maghur	1935–2002	1986–1987	Jadallah Azzuz at-Talhi
	Jadallah Azzuz at-Talhi	1939–2024	1987–1990	Umar Mustafa al-Muntasir
	Ibrahim al Bishari	c. 1942–1997	1990–1992	Abuzed Omar Dorda
	Umar Mustafa al-Muntasir	1939–2001	1992–2000	Abuzed Omar Dorda (1992–1994); Abdul Majid al-Qa′ud (1994–1997); Muhammad Ahmad al-Mangoush (1997–2000)
	Abdel Rahman Shalgham	born 1949	2000–2009	Imbarek Shamekh (2000–2003); Shukri Ghanem (2003–2006); Baghdadi Mahmudi (2006–2009)
	Moussa Koussa	born 1950	2009–2011	Baghdadi Mahmudi
	Abdul Ati al-Obeidi (2nd time)	1939–2023	2011	Baghdadi Mahmudi
=== Transitional period (2011–2021) ===
Portrait	Name	Lifespan	Term of office	Prime Minister
	Mahmoud Jibril	1952–2020	23 March 2011 – 23 November 2011	Mahmoud Jibril
	Ashour Bin Khayal	born 1939	24 November 2011 – 14 November 2012	Abdurrahim El-Keib
	Mohamed Abdelaziz	born c. 1952	14 November 2012 – 28 September 2014	Ali Zeidan (2012–2014); Abdullah al-Thani (2014)
	Mohammed al-Dairi	born 1952	28 September 2014 – 28 February 2019	Abdullah al-Thani
	Abdulhadi Elhweg	born 1971	28 February 2019 – 15 March 2021	Abdullah al-Thani
=== Government of National Accord (2016–2021) ===
Portrait	Name	Lifespan	Term of office	Prime Minister
	Mohamed Taha Siala	born 1943	30 March 2016 – 15 March 2021	Fayez al-Sarraj
=== Government of National Unity (2021–present) ===
Portrait	Name	Lifespan	Term of office	Prime Minister
	Najla Mangoush	born 1970	15 March 2021 – 28 August 2023 (Suspended)	Abdul Hamid Dbeibeh
	Fathallah al-Zani (Acting)	born 1985	28 August 2023 – 3 September 2023	Abdul Hamid Dbeibeh
	Abdul Hamid Dbeibeh (Acting)	born 1958	3 September 2023 – Present	Abdul Hamid Dbeibeh

== Notes ==
1. Despite that the list shown on website of Libyan foreign ministry are one of the sources used in this list, it omits some ministers, like Shams ad-Din Orabi, and Ali Hassanein, between Ahmad Bishti, and Salah Busir.
