= Abdul Qadir al-Allam =

Libyan politician (1919–2003)

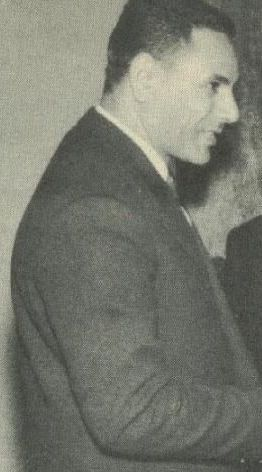

Foreign Minister of Libya
- In office 16 October 1960 – 3 May 1961
- Prime Minister: Muhammad Osman Said
- Preceded by: Abdul Majid Kubar
- Succeeded by: Suleiman Jerbi

Defense Minister of Libya
- In office 30 October 1956 – 26 May 1957
- Prime Minister: Mustafa Ben Halim
- Preceded by: Ali Ju'uda
- Succeeded by: As-Siddig al-Mutassir

Transport Minister of Libya
- In office 26 May 1957 – 24 April 1958
- Prime Minister: Abdul Majid Kubar
- Preceded by: Ali Sahli
- Succeeded by: Ismail Ben Lamin

Economy Minister of Libya
- In office 29 September – 16 October 1961
- Prime Minister: Abdul Majid Kubar
- Preceded by: Muhammad Osman Said
- Succeeded by: Abdul Qadir al-Badri

Agriculture Minister of Cyrenaica Emirate
- In office 18 March 1950 – 24 December 1951
- Prime Minister: Muhammad Sakizli
- Preceded by: Hussein Maziq
- Succeeded by: Independence of Libya

Personal details
- Born: October 1919
- Died: 8 July 2003 (aged 83)

Abdul Qadir al-Allam (Arabic: عبد القادر العلام) (October 1919 – 8 July 2003) was a Libyan politician. He held several ministerial posts;

- Minister of Agriculture of Cyrenaica emirate (March 1950 – December 1951).
- Defense minister of Libya (October 1956 – May 1957).
- Transport minister of Libya (May 1957 – April 1958).
- Economy minister of Libya (September – October 1960).
- Foreign minister of Libya (October – May 1961).

== Biography ==
He was Minister of Agriculture and Forestry at the time of the Government of the Emirate of Berqa (March 1950 – December 1951), that is to say until the independence of Libya.

He served as Minister of Defense under the reign of Mustapha Ben Halim (October 1956 – May 1957), then transport during the reign of Abdel-Majid Kabbar (May 1957 – April 1958) and then from the economy to the last Government days (September – October 1960).

He assumed the functions of Minister of Foreign Affairs at the beginning of the reign of Mohamed Osman Al-Sayad (October 1960 – May 1961).
