= Ahmad Bishti =

Libyan politician (1927–2016)

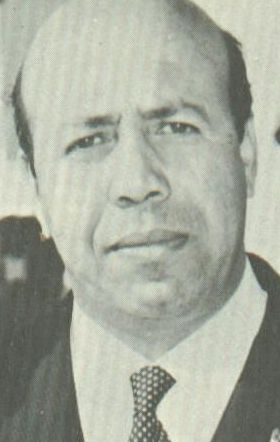

Libyan Foreign Minister
- In office 2 October 1965 – 4 January 1968
- Prime Minister: Hussein Maziq; Abdul Qadir al-Badri; Abdul Hamid al-Bakkoush
- Preceded by: Wahbi al-Bouri
- Succeeded by: Wanis al-Qaddafi

Personal details
- Born: 8 August 1927
- Died: 2016 (aged 88–89)

Ahmad Bishti (8 August 1927 – 2016) was a Libyan politician who was the Minister of Foreign Affairs from 1965 to 1968. He became an ambassador of Libya to Turkey after he left office in 1968. He graduated as surgeon from University of Cairo in 1959.

== Biography ==
Bishti was born on 8 August 1927. He graduated as a surgeon at Cairo University in 1959 and practiced medicine between 1960 and 1963.

He was appointed Minister of Health at the end of the government of Mohamed Osman El Seid and the governments of Mohiuddin Fikini and Mahmud Al-Montaser (March 1963-March 1965), then Minister of Foreign Affairs of the Governments of Hussein Maazak, Abdul Qader Al-Badri and Abdel-Hamid Al-Bakoush (October 1965).

Bishti became ambassador to Turkey from January 1968 and was ambassador during the 1969 coup in Libya. He died in 2016.
