= Orabi =

Orabi is a surname. Notable people with the surname include:

- Ahmed ‘Urabi ("Orabi" in Egyptian Arabic; 1841–1911), Egyptian rebel and patriot
- Ibrahim Orabi (1912–1957), Egyptian sport wrestler
- Mohamed Orabi (born 1951), Egyptian diplomat and politician
- Osama Orabi (born 1962), Egyptian footballer
- Shams ad-Din Orabi (died 2009), Libyan politician
