= Libya–Morocco relations =

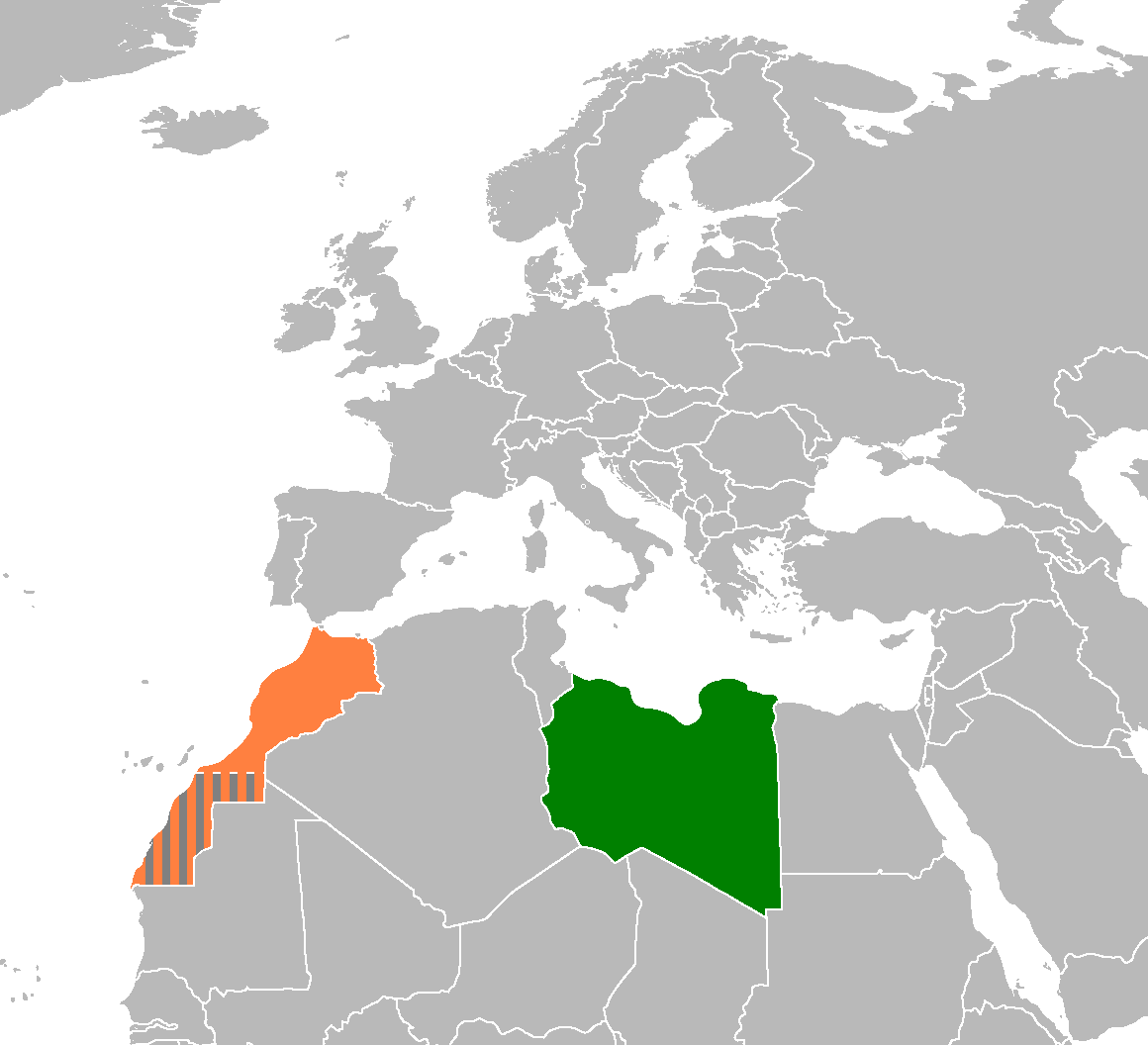

- Libya: Morocco

Libya–Morocco relations is the bilateral relations between Libya and Morocco, two Arab countries situated in the Maghreb region of North Africa. Libya has an embassy in Rabat and Morocco has an embassy in Tripoli, which was attacked by ISIS militants in 2015.

== History ==
Libya and Morocco share a relatively close bond dated from antiquity. Both are Maghreb nations and used to be under Arab conquest, as well as later adoption of Islam. However, subsequent contact between two was derived by various historic incidents: Morocco went on to develop into an independent Arab-Berber kingdom with a distinct identity; while Libya went to become part of the Ottoman Empire. The end of Ottoman Empire saw both Libya and Morocco falling under colonization, Libya was ruled under the Italians and Morocco under the French and Spanish . Libya would become the first among Maghreb nation to regain independence, as for the result of the World War II and Italian defeat; while Morocco would have to wait until 1956 to gain complete independence from France and Spain. Since then, Libya and Morocco established relations.

The two countries were initially together being monarchies, with King Idris of Libya and King Mohammed V of Morocco shared strong personal relationship. However, a massive wave of pan-Arabism came together affected both countries, which caused the fall of Libyan Senussi family; but its Moroccan counterparts were able to survive amidst turbulent relations.

Since then, Morocco and Libya entered a tense chapter, as Libya fell under Muammar Gaddafi. Personal hostilities between two rulers soon escalated into national conflict. Gaddafi meddled on Western Sahara issue, supported Polisario; Hassan II of Morocco's secret relations with Israel caused tensions between two nations. At 1987, Gaddafi was found to have planned for a possible assassination against Hassan II, which was never materialized. Nonetheless, the two countries maintained a poor relationship, and distrust from Gaddafi toward Hassan II and later, Mohammed VI of Morocco, prompted Gaddafi to have his own view distance from the Moroccan King; despite two countries used to form a political alliance at 1984 (disbanded after 1986 meeting between Hassan II with Shimon Peres).

Tensions between Libya and Morocco cooled down with the re-integration of Libya to global community, but distrust between two countries still ran high. When Mohammed VI visited Libya in 2001, Gaddafi was found to have called him "my son", which was seen as an insult to Moroccan Royal family. Morocco continued to maintain a unique pro-Western orientation policy while Libya under Gaddafi maintained a pseudo and unstable policy. This divergence would remain until 2011.

=== After Libyan Revolution ===
The 2011 Libyan War occurred as Libyans showed disdains against Gaddafi's dictatorship, and the product of Arab Spring, Morocco also suffered protests. However, Morocco was quick to throw support to Libyan revolutionaries against Gaddafi Government and denounced him in Arab League; as well as King Mohammed VI offered political reforms. After the war ended with Gaddafi's death, Morocco expected a great hope of growing tie between two countries. However, violence within Libya soon escalated into the 2014 Libyan War, which torn down much of the country. Morocco, once again, acted as a partner to solve diplomatic problems within various Libyan rival factions, brokering the UN-led faction deal in 2015 to form a unity Government.
