= Omar Mahmud al-Muntasir =

Libyan politician (1930–1999)

Libyan Foreign minister
- In office 6 – 19 March 1963
- Prime Minister: Muhammad Osman Said
- Preceded by: Wanis al-Qaddafi
- Succeeded by: Mohieddin Fikini

Libyan Justice minister
- In office 11 October 1962 – 6 March 1963
- Prime Minister: Muhammad Osman Said
- Preceded by: Wahbi al-Bouri
- Succeeded by: Abu Bakr Naama
- In office 19 March 1963 – 22 January 1964
- Prime Minister: Mohieddin Fikini
- Preceded by: Abu Bakr Naama
- Succeeded by: Abdul Hamid al-Bakkoush

Personal details
- Born: 28 July 1930
- Died: 1999 (aged 68–69)

Omar Mahmud al-Muntasir (28 July 1930 – 1999) was a Libyan politician. He served as minister of Justice between October 1962 to January 1964 (in Muhammad Osman Said and Mohieddin Fikini cabinets), interrupted only by his short service (probably the shortest in Libya's history) as foreign minister (6–19 March 1963).

He is the son of Libyan prime minister Mahmud al-Muntasir.
