= Salah Busir =

Libyan statesman (1925-1973)

Salah Masoud Busir
- صالح مسعود بويصير
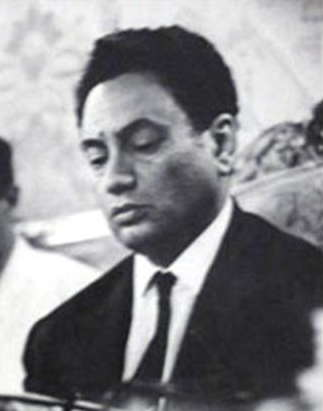
- Born: 1925; Benghazi, Cyrenaica, Italian Libya
- Died: February 21, 1973 (aged 47–48); Near Ismailia, Sinai, Egypt
- Cause of death: Airliner Shootdown
- Education: Al-Azhar University
- Occupations: Politician, journalist, and historian

Libyan Minister of Foreign Affairs
- In office September 8, 1969 – October 16, 1970
- President: Muammar Gaddafi
- Preceded by: Ali Hassanein
- Succeeded by: Mohammed Najm

Libyan Minister of Information
- In office October 16, 1970 – 1972

Salah Masoud Busir (Arabic: صالح مسعود بويصير, 1925 – February 21, 1973) was a Libyan politician, journalist, and historian. Born into a merchant family, he grew to have a successful career in journalism, politics, and science. He was an advocate for Arab values and for the independence of Libya from Italy. Busir was a strong opponent of first the Italian colonial occupation of Libya, and later the Libyan monarchy. As a result of this, he was forced to emigrate from Libya on two separate occasions. The 1969 Libyan coup d'état and subsequent coming to power of Muammar Gaddafi in 1969 allowed him to return from his 14-year exile. He became the first Foreign Minister of the Libyan Arab Republic and sought to eliminate foreign military bases in Libya. In 1972, he tried to promote his ideas at the pan-Arab level, but in February 1973, the plane on which he was flying was shot down by an Israeli fighter over the Sinai Peninsula.

== Biography ==
=== Early life ===
Salah Busir was born in 1925 in Benghazi into the family of a merchant. He was about six years old when, in 1931, Italian authorities captured and hanged sheikh Omar al-Mukhtar, who led the armed struggle for the independence of Libya. The result of this was a general surge in Libyan nationalism and anti-Italian sentiments throughout Libya. When Salah graduated from high school in Benghazi, his father refused to educate him in Libya and sent him to study abroad in the de facto independent Egypt.

=== Immigration to Cairo and World War II ===
In the late 1930s, Busir arrived in Cairo where he entered Al-Azhar al-Sharif Theological University. In the Kingdom of Egypt, the British had a large economic and governmental presence. At the same time, there was a popular movement to decrease British influence and restore Egyptian sovereignty. On the one hand, this contributed to the growth of Arab nationalism. However, since the British were opponents of the Italians, the Libyans who studied in Egypt, unlike the Egyptians, saw them as their allies. Salah Busir quickly became one of the prominent figures among Libyan students at the university. He involved himself in politics and actively participated in meetings where the regime of fascist Italy was condemned.

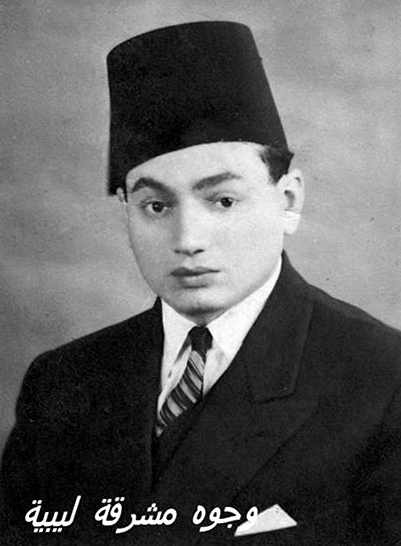
A young Salah Busir

When World War II broke out, the situation in Libya became more volatile. Busir, a fledgling journalist in Cairo, began giving speeches over the radio which were broadcast to Italian Libya. He denounced the policies of the fascist Italians and called on the people to begin a "holy war" against the Italians. The British administration in Egypt soon took notice of Busir, and, in 1943, when Libya was liberated from the Italo-German forces, he returned to his homeland. There he began to spread political information and the goals of the allied forces. He worked for the Benghazi newspaper "(Arabic: بنغازي)", published by the Allies, and then in 1944 transferred to the newspaper Barka al- Jadida "(Arabic: برقة الجديدة -" New Cyrenaica "), which was published in Arabic.

=== Life as a progressive journalist and royal representative ===
However, cooperation with the British was short-lived, and soon Busir began to criticize the British occupation. After 1946, British control began to wane, and the Libya al-Jadida newspaper took a more independent position. They began to echo ideas expressed in the Egyptian press, and spoke in condemnation of British rule, as well as for the freedom and sovereignty of Libya. In 1947, Busir and others founded the monthly journal Dawn of Libya (Arabic: الفجر الليبي), with the motto "Frankness and Truth". After leaving the al-Jadida paper in 1949, the magazine became his main focus. The magazine played a major role during the turbulent election of the first parliament of Cyrenaica, as they had opposed certain government representatives and criticized the British authorities.

In December 1951, the country gained independence, and in February 1952 the now famous journalist Salah Busir was elected to the Chamber of Representatives of the Parliament of the Kingdom of Libya from the region of Cyrenaica. He was soon elected deputy chairman of the House and became one of the leaders of the Progressive Nationalists group. In the same, Busir began to publish the weekly newspaper "Al-Difaa" (Arabic: الدفاع – "Defense"). However, the conditions of the time temporarily halted his political career. A scandal evolved out of suspicions that the 1952 election was rigged. All political parties were banned in the kingdom, and the king consolidated power, gaining the ability to veto or suspend the parliament should the need arise.

In terms of foreign policy, King Idris focused on developing deeper ties with Great Britain, whom he considered his ally. He also furthered cooperation with the United States. Libya, which did not yet have oil revenues, remained a relatively poor country, and taxes remained the largest source of national income. Despite the king's views, Busir remained faithful to his nationalist convictions. While writing for Al-Difaa, he criticized the Anglo-Libyan agreement pertaining to the creation of military bases in Libya and opposed the king's close advisers.

=== Correspondence with the Queen of the United Kingdom and fleeing the nation ===
Busir's life was drastically altered in 1954, when the Al-Difaa was shut down by the authorities. In September 1954, Libyan authorities signed an agreement extending the lease of the US Air Force base Wheelus Air Base until 1970 in exchange for annual subsidies of up to $50 million. On October 5, the queen's brother Sharif bin Seyyed Muhid-din al-Senusi killed Ibrahim al- Shalhi, who, since 1916, had been the adviser to Idris. A state of emergency put into place, which complicated the situation of the already weak opposition.

In 1955, Salah Busir made a risky move. On behalf of Queen Fatima, he sent a letter to Queen Elizabeth II of the United Kingdom, asking her to persuade Idris I to veto the execution of Queen Fatima's 19-year-old brother, who killed Shalha. This maneuver did not catch the attention of the monarch. Fatima later stated that she knew nothing about the letter. It is unclear whether the letter to the Queen of the United Kingdom was the initiative of Busir himself, or if he had been influenced by Fatima's court. Soon, government officers went to representative Busir's house. He was charged with a felony – falsification of documents – and ended up in jail. This marked the end of Busir's career in the Kingdom.

However, his prison stay would not last long. With the secret assistance of either the court, or with the help of the enemies of the monarchy, he escaped from prison as early as August 1955. Disguised as a woman, with a niqab hiding his face, he was able to freely pass by border control at an international airport and made his way to Tunisia. His family was waiting for him in Cairo.

=== The fate of the immigrant Busir ===
Although his actions were not of the scale of an uprising against the monarchy, he still gained a reputation as a political emigrant who was being persecuted by Libyan authorities. Prior to 1969, he lived in Egypt, occasionally staying in Ghana, Saudi Arabia, and Tunisia. Libyan authorities shut down all of Busir's finances and seized his property, yet he refused to accept money from the Egyptian authorities. According to other sources, his life in Egypt was relatively stable and comfortable. His family was close by, and money was being sent to him from Libya to maintain a standard of living. Many requests were sent to the Egyptian government to extradite him to Libya as a criminal. At the same time, Busir himself visited the Libyan embassy, where he had acquaintances. He sought to help the Libyans who found themselves in a difficult situation in Egypt. Some relatives and close friends have said that authorities offered the Busir return to Libya, promising to amicably settle the problem with the court, but he refused to leave Cairo.

During this period, Busir established close contacts within Palestinian liberation movement (Fatah) who provided him with all kinds of support, including financial support. Among his acquaintances were such Arab leaders as Yasser Arafat, then known as Abu Ammar, Ahmed Ben Bella, and Huari Boumedien. As a member of the Committee in Support of Palestine, Busir visited Jerusalem several times (until 1967), as well as visiting Palestinian refugee camps in Jordan, Lebanon, and Syria . He helped the Palestinians fleeing to Egypt, and in 1968 he became one of the founders of the Islamic Committee, which organized education Palestinian students and incurred part of the cost of their education. At the same time, Busir began a scientific career at Al-Azhar University, where he received a master's degree in history, defending a dissertation on the theme "Jihad of the Palestinian people".

=== Minister of the Revolutionary Government ===
After the 1969 Libyan coup d'état, Salah Busir returned to Libya and accepted the proposal to join the governing Council of the Revolutionary Command, led by Muammar Gaddafi. Busir was to lead the Foreign Ministry of the new Republic. On September 8, 1969, he was appointed Minister of Foreign Affairs and Unity in the cabinet under Mahmud Suleiman Maghribi. Its main task was the negotiations surrounding the liquidation of foreign military bases in the country, as well as on the redistribution of oil revenues. Two weeks after his appointment, Busir called the ambassadors of the United States and Great Britain and said that if it was confirmed that they were supplying Israel with tanks and other military equipment, Libya would have to reconsider its relationship with London and Washington. A few days later, on October 31, he summoned the US ambassador and handed him a note demanding the liquidation of the Wheelus Air Base. The British ambassador also received a note with a proposal to begin negotiations on the evacuation of British troops, but in December the major role in negotiations with the USA and Great Britain passed to the member of the SRK Major (and later prime minister) Abdessalam Jalloud. Despite a decline in his influence, Busir retained his post in Gaddafi's government. Busir's hard work paid off, and on March 27, 1970, the British air base in El Adem and the naval base in Tobruk were abandoned, and on June 11, 1970, the American flag was lowered over Wheelus Air base.

Busir served as Foreign Minister until October 16, 1970, when he was replaced by a member of the Council of the Revolutionary Command, Major Mohammed Najm. Less than a year later, on August 16, 1971, he took the post of Minister of Information, but left in 1972 when he nominated himself and was elected to the Federal National Assembly of the Federation of Arab Republics. Until his death, he continued to deal with the Palestinian problem and the history of Libya, and subsequently prepared a doctoral dissertation on the topic of the "Jihad of the Libyan people", but did not have time to defend it.

=== Death ===
Salah Masoud Busir died on the morning of February 21, 1973, in a plane crash, when the plane was shot down by an Israeli fighter over the Sinai Peninsula in the Ismailia region. Some alleged that Busir had become a target for Israel, and felt that the terrorist attack at Munich Olympics in 1972 was a way of avenging his death. Salah Busir is revered in the Arab world as a sort of martyr.

=== Family ===
Salah Busir was a married man and had two children, Muhammad and Fadwa Busir. Muhammad made many efforts to launch an investigation into the death of his father, but, ultimately, achieved nothing and emigrated from Libya. Muhammad later served as chairman for the "American-Libyan Alliance for Freedom," an anti-Gaddafi organization. He reconciled with Gaddafi in 2006 and attended Gaddafi's 37th anniversary in power that September.

Fadwa attended university, becoming a professor as well as a local celebrity. In 2008, she gave an interview on 35th anniversary of her father's death and said that she had learned about the death of her father over the radio in London, where her family was at that time. Fadwa says Libya has not done enough to get Israel to provide more information on the plane crash.

== Bibliography ==
- Naumkin, Vitaly (1987). Новейшая история арабских стран Африки. 1917—1987 (in Russian). Наука. Главная редакция восточной литературы. ISBN 5-02-016714-2.

Preceded by Ali Hassanein	Minister of Foreign Affairs and Information of Libya September 8, 1969 – October 16, 1970	Succeeded by Mohammed Najm
