= Ali Jerbi =

Libyan politician

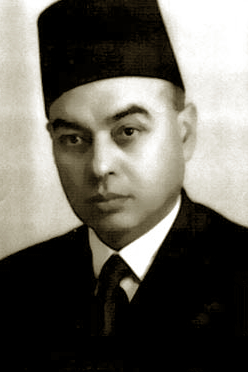
- al-Jerbi in 1949

Libyan Minister of Defence
- In office 24 December 1951 – 18 February 1954
- Prime Minister: Mahmud al-Muntasir
- Preceded by: Omar Faiek Shennib (Before independence)
- Succeeded by: Khalil el-Gallal

Interim Foreign Minister of Libya
- In office 29 March – 24 December 1951
- Prime Minister: Mahmud al-Muntasir
- Preceded by: none
- Succeeded by: Mahmud al-Muntasir (After independence)

Interim Health Minister of Libya
- In office 29 March – 17 April 1951
- Prime Minister: Mahmud al-Muntasir
- Preceded by: none
- Succeeded by: Muhammad Osman Said

Interim Justice Minister of Libya
- In office 17 April – 24 December 1951
- Prime Minister: Mahmud al-Muntasir
- Preceded by: Mahmud al-Muntasir
- Succeeded by: Fathi el-Kikhia (After independence)

Personal details
- Born: 1903 Derna
- Died: 19 April 1969 (aged 66)

Sayed Ali Assad Ibrahim al-Jerbi (Arabic: علي الجربي) (1903–1969) was a Libyan politician. He was the first defence minister of Libya after independence.

== Personal life ==
Jerbi was born in Derna, Libya. In 1911 he studied in Turkey, then part of the Ottoman Empire. He lived in Istanbul until 1923, when he returned and worked as a teacher. He died in April 1969.

== Career ==
=== Before independence ===
He held the post of Minister of Transport of Cyrenaica Emirate from September 1949 – July 1950. He then entered the interim government (headed by Mahmud al-Muntasir), where he served as Foreign minister (March–December 1951), Health minister (March–April 1951) and Justice minister (April–December 1951).

=== Defence minister ===
He became minister for defence in the first cabinet formed after independence from December 1951 to February 1954.

He'd aimed during his term to establish the Libyan Army from the surviving members of the Senussi force, who fought with the western allies in World War II. He gave recruits military scholarships to Iraq and Turkey for military training, established the military academy in Benghazi.

=== Ambassador ===
He became the Libyan ambassador to Turkey and non-resident ambassador in Iraq from 1954 to 1961. He became ambassador to France 1961–1967.
