= Fathallah al-Zani =

Libyan politician

Minister of Youth
- Incumbent
- Assumed office 15 March 2021
- President: Mohamed al-Menfi
- Prime Minister: Abdul Hamid Dbeibeh
- Preceded by: Faida El-Shafi (as Minister of Social Affairs)

Minister of Foreign Affairs
- (Acting)
- In office 28 August 2023 – 3 September 2023
- President: Mohamed al-Menfi
- Prime Minister: Abdul Hamid Dbeibeh
- Preceded by: Najla El Mangoush
- Succeeded by: Abdul Hamid Dbeibeh (Acting)

Personal details
- Born: Derna, Libya
- Party: Independent

Fathallah Abd Al-Latif Al-Zani is a Libyan politician who has served as acting Minister of Foreign Affairs since August 2023. He had previously served as youth minister since 2021.

He addressed the General debate of the seventy-eighth session of the United Nations General Assembly in September 2023.

== See also ==
- List of current foreign ministers
