= Najla El Mangoush =

Libyan diplomat and lawyer

- نجلاء محمد المنقوش
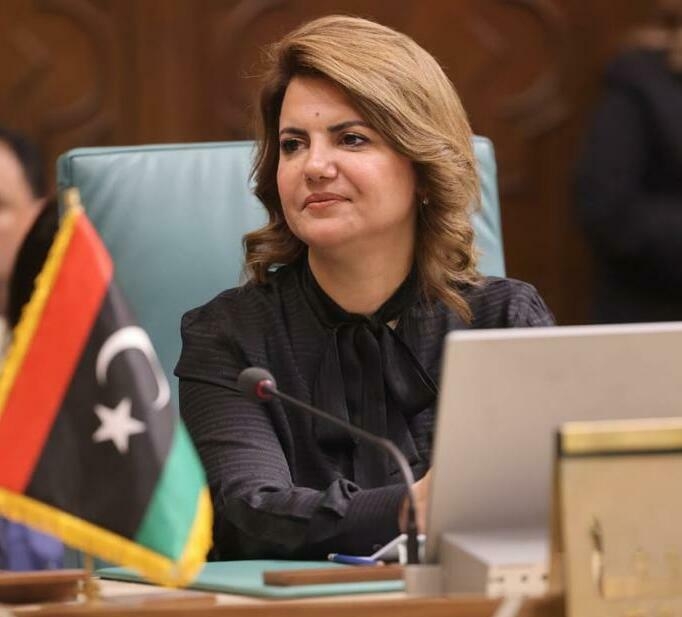
- Mangoush in 2022

Minister of Foreign Affairs
- Suspended
- Assumed office 15 March 2021; Suspended: 28 August 2023 – present
- President: Mohamed al-Menfi
- Prime Minister: Abdul Hamid Dbeibeh
- Preceded by: Mohamed Taha Siala
- Succeeded by: Fathallah al-Zani (Acting)

Personal details
- Born: 7 June 1973 (age 53) Cardiff, Wales, United Kingdom
- Party: Independent
- Education: Eastern Mennonite University; George Mason University

Najla Mohammed El Mangoush (Arabic: نجلاء المنقوش; born 7 June 1973) is a Libyan diplomat and lawyer. She was Libya's foreign minister in Abdul Hamid Dbeibeh's government from 15 March 2021 until her dismissal on 28 August 2023. El Mangoush has been Libya's first and only female foreign minister, and the fifth woman to hold the position of a foreign minister in the Arab World.

== Early life and education ==
Najla El Mangoush was born in Cardiff, Wales, to a family of four children who originated from Libya, but she grew up in Benghazi, the city to which the family returned, when she was six years old.

El Mangoush was trained as a lawyer at Benghazi University (then Garyounis University) and was later an assistant professor of law at the university. She later obtained a Fulbright Scholarship to the United States of America, where she graduated from the Center for Justice and Peacebuilding at Eastern Mennonite University in Virginia.

== Career ==
=== Early career ===
As a conflict-resolution expert, she was the country representative in Libya for United States Institute of Peace.

She has served as the Program Officer for Peace-building and Traditional Law at the Center for World Religions, Diplomacy and Conflict Resolution in Arlington, Virginia.

During the First Libyan Civil War, she headed the National Transitional Council's (NTC) Public Engagement Unit which dealt with civil society organisations.

=== Foreign minister ===
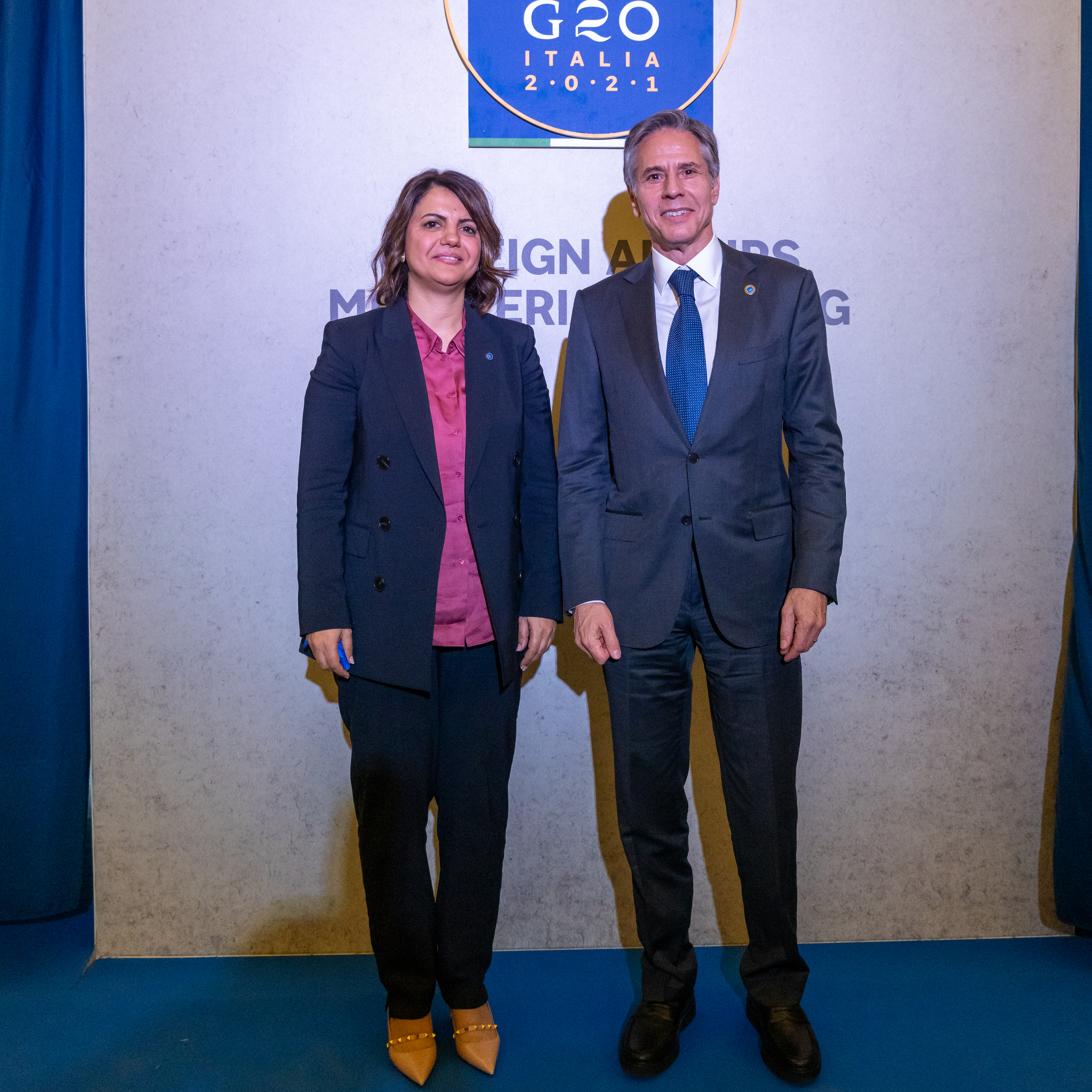
Mangoush meets with U.S. Secretary of State Antony J. Blinken in Bari, Italy on 29 June 2021.

On 15 March 2021 she became the foreign minister in Abdul Hamid Dbeibeh's cabinet, which is a part of the government of national unity. She is the first female foreign minister of Libya and the fifth to hold such a position in the Arab World after Naha Mint Mouknass (2009–2011) and Vatma Vall Mint Soueina (2015) of Mauritania, Fawzia Yusuf H. Adam (2012–2014) of Somalia and Asma Mohamed Abdalla (2019–2020) of Sudan.

In May 2021, she came under pressure to resign and been subjected to personal abuse after she called Turkey to comply with the UN resolutions and withdraw the Turkish troops and mercenaries from Libya.

On 6 November 2021, the Presidential Council suspended Mangoush on charges of carrying out foreign policy without coordination with the council. She was also barred from traveling. Prime Minister Abdul Hamid Dbeibeh disputed the right of the Presidential Council to suspend Mangoush, saying the power to appoint or suspend ministers in his government is his exclusive preserve.

After the announcement of a meeting between Mangoush and Israeli Foreign Minister Eli Cohen in Italy on 27 August 2023, she was suspended, and an investigation was opened against her. On 28 August, she was dismissed from Dbeibeh's cabinet. She fled Libya first to Turkey and later London, where her family resides, the same day out of fear for her safety amid a growing uproar in Tripoli over the issue.

== Awards ==
On December 7, 2021, Mangoush was named in the BBC 100 Women 2021 list for her work on building links with civil society organisations. In 2022, Mangoush received the International Women of Courage Award from the United States Department of State.

== See also ==
- List of foreign ministers in 2021
- List of foreign ministers in 2022
- List of foreign ministers in 2023
