= Ali Hussnein =

Libyan politician

Ali Husnein

Foreign Minister of Libya
- In office June – 31 August 1969
- Prime Minister: Wanis al-Qaddafi
- Preceded by: Shams ad-Din Orabi
- Succeeded by: Salah Busir

Personal details
- Born: 20 March 1925 Tripoli, Italian Tripolitania
- Died: 20 May 2018 (aged 93) Tripoli, Libya

Ali Hussnein or Ali Sadiq Hussnein (Arabic: علي الصادق حُسنين) (20 March 1925 – 20 May 2018) was a Libyan politician. He was the last foreign minister of the Kingdom of Libya (June–August 1969).

He participated in translating the Qur'an into Italian and also translated several Italian books into Arabic. Prior to becoming foreign minister, Husnein had been the Libyan ambassador to the Soviet Union, Finland, and Nigeria.
