= Hussein Maziq =

Libyan politician (1918–2006)

Hussein Maziq حسين يوسف مازق
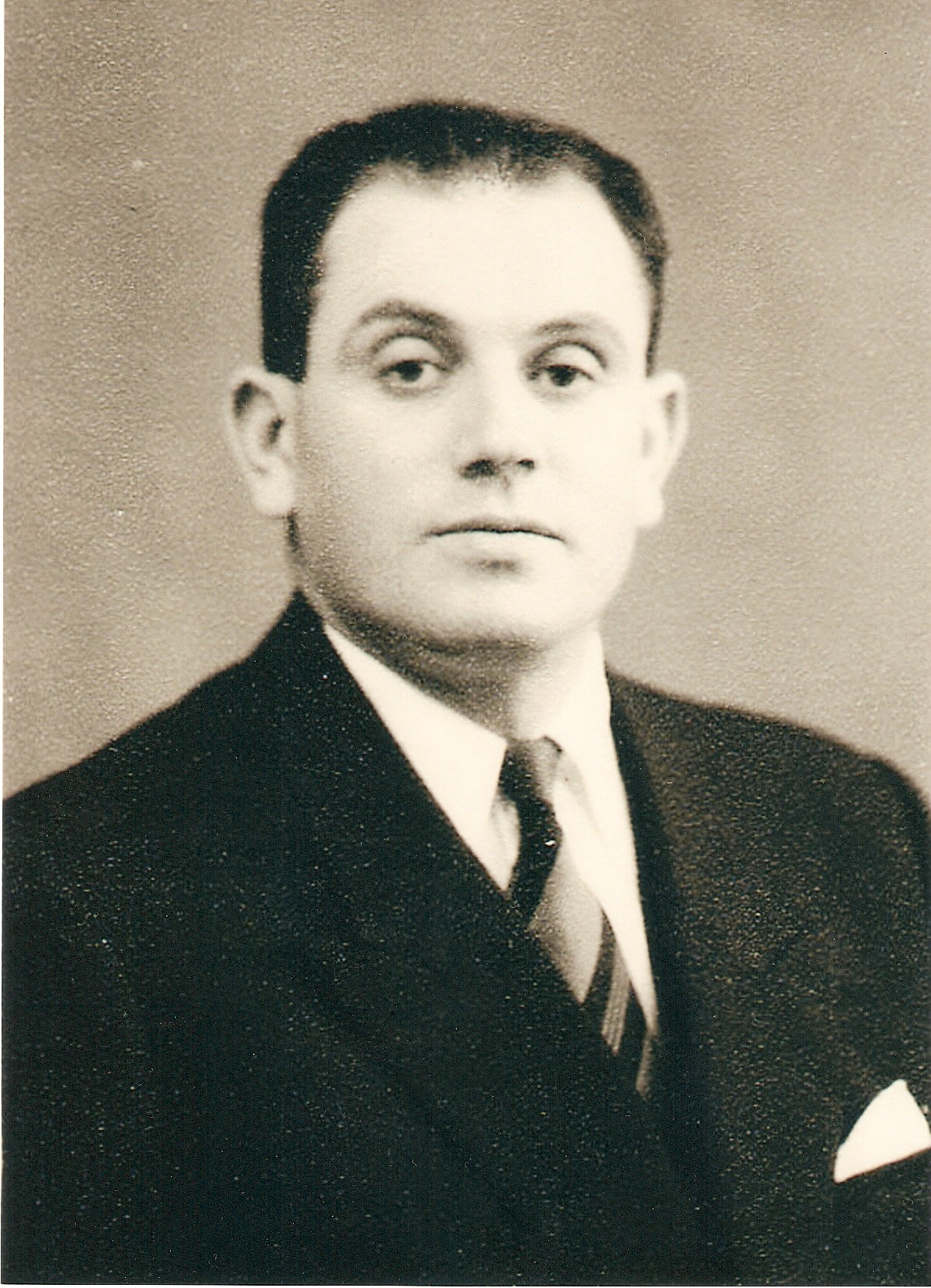

Prime Minister of Libya
- In office 18 March 1965 – 2 July 1967
- Monarch: Idris I
- Preceded by: Mahmud al-Muntasir
- Succeeded by: Abdul Qadir al-Badri

Foreign Minister of Libya
- In office 22 January 1964 – 18 March 1965
- Prime Minister: Mahmud al-Muntasir
- Preceded by: Mohieddin Fikini
- Succeeded by: Wahbi al-Bouri

Governor of Cyrenaica
- In office May 1952 – October 1961
- Preceded by: Muhammad Sakizli
- Succeeded by: Mahmud Buhedma

Personal details
- Born: 26 June 1918 Tacnis, Libya
- Died: 12 May 2006 (aged 87) Benghazi, Libya

Hussein Yousef Maziq (Arabic: حسين يوسف مازق; 26 June 1918 – 12 May 2006) was a Libyan politician who was Prime Minister of Libya from 20 March 1965 to 2 July 1967. He was one of the most important men in the Kingdom era of Libya.

== Family background ==
Maziq was a descendant of the Haddouth family of the Barasa tribe living in Cyrenaica, Libya. Haddouth, from whom the family bears its name, had been in 1822 already in charge of leading the Barasa. Instantly, his son Abubakr, assumed the leadership of Barasa. In 1844, the Ottoman Empire appointed him a Bey over all the Harabi tribes (including Barasa and Ubaidat). He had involved in 1860 in the Barasa-Ubaidat War, but he had not survived to see its end. He moved to Benghazi and died there in 1870. His son Maziq inherited the leadership and management of the conflict until the combatants agreed to make peace in 1890.

Maziq (Hussein's grandfather) remained the leader of the Barasa until his death in 1909. He had four sons: El Mabrouk (his political heir), Yousef (Hussein's father), Bushdeig, and Uroug, a folk-poet.

As the Italians invaded Libya in 1911, El Mabrouk led the Barasa against them, as the leaders of other tribes did. He was killed in the battle of "Ain Bumansur" near Derna in 1912. Since he had no children, Yousef became the Barasa's leader.

== Early life ==
Hussein Yousef Maziq was born in 1918 near Tacnis (120 km east of Benghazi). Because of Yousef's connection to the resistance leaders, Libya's Italian government arrested and expatriated him along with his wife, Mardiya, and the newly born Hussein to Cyrene, where Yousef stayed until his death in 1934.

A long time before his death, Yousef has lost his sight, so the Barasa's leadership was transferred to his brother Bushdeig. In 1929, Bushdeig attended the Sidi Rhuma talks between the resistance leaders, headed by Omar Mukhtar, and Libya's Italian government, headed by Pietro Badoglio. Hussein Mizaq, then 11, also was there, and, as he told more than once, met Mukhtar who knew his parents.

Hussein studied in an Italian school in Cyrene for a while, but the Italian government prevented him from continuing his studies. In 1937, he was a supervisor at the Via Balbia road project, he was responsible of organizing the accounts describing the salaries and savings of Libyan workers.

In 1940, Hussein Maziq was invited along with several famous men from Cyrenaica, to visit Italy, where they met Benito Mussolini. Fearing of being attacked by Allies' Navy, he wished to go back to Libya before the Italian involvement in war, and he reached Libya some two weeks before the Italian declaration of war on France and Britain on 10 June 1940.

In 1943 during World War II, Italians were expelled from Libya, and in 1944, emir Idris Senussi returned to it from exile, and approximately in 1946, he met Maziq for the first time and admired him. This was the beginning of Hussein's political career.

== Governor ==
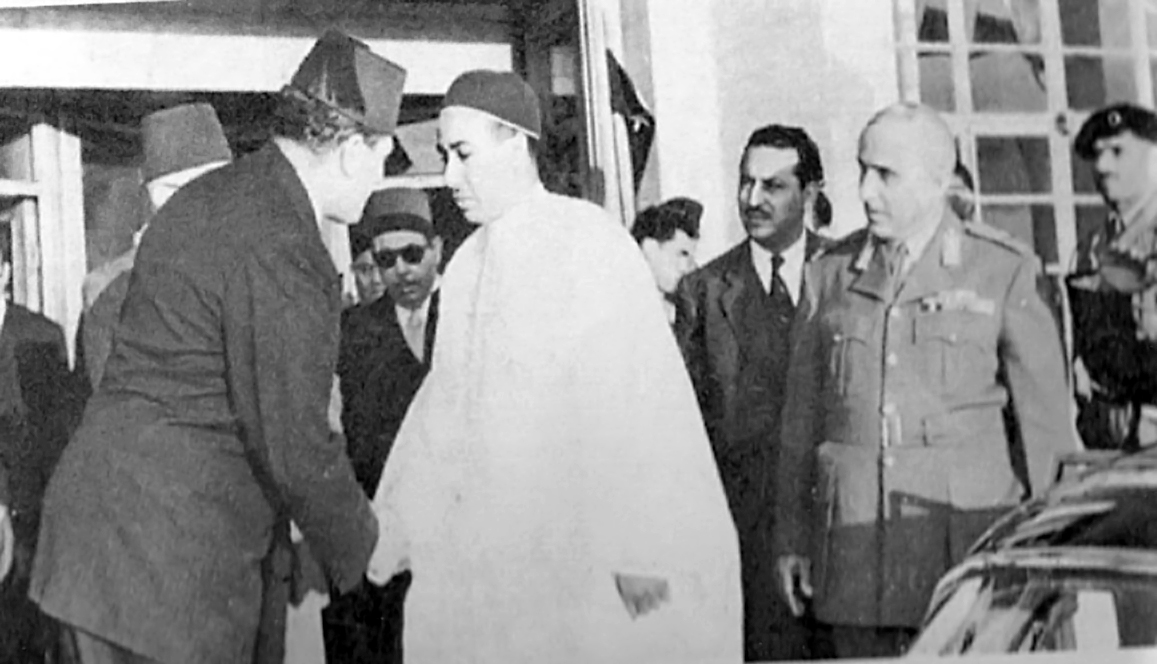
Crown Prince Hasan (in white) shaking hands with Governor Hussein Maziq. Wanis al-Qaddafi and General Buguaitin are standing behind the prince.

On 1 June 1949, emir Idris declared the "independence" of Cyrenaica . Although this independence could be considered nominal because of the high British influence, forming a new government was necessary. After a short-lived government under Omar Pasha El Kikhia, Muhammad Sakizli formed a new cabinet in 1950, and under him, 32-year-old Maziq became a minister for interior and education. After King Idris I of Libya declared its independence 24 December 1951, Sakizli's title changed to be "Governor" of Cyrenaica and remained in that post until May 1952, when Maziq was assigned to be the governor.

During Maziq's governorship, one of the most critical events faced him is the murder of Ibrahim El Shalhi, King Idris's loyalist aide, on 5 October 1954, by a young grandson of Ahmed Sharif es Senussi (King Idris's cousin and father-in-law). The killer was trialed, then executed. But for the King, agitated by Busairi El Shalhi (the victim's son), this was not enough, he persecuted the killer's cousins. Maziq opposed this extension of punishment. However, this opposition didn't harm his relation with the King, but he disliked some close men to the King, Busairi was one of them, so he often disagreed with him, and this will lead eventually to Maziq's resignation on 15 October 1961.

Thereafter, Maziq headed no political posts until January 1964, when he became a foreign minister in Mahmud al-Muntasir's cabinet. At that time, troubles were not very far. On 22 February 1964, President Gamal Abdul Nasser of Egypt made a speech in his country saying that:" … [the foreign military] bases existing in Libya …are a danger to the whole Arab nation." This speech, accompanied with anti-Libyan propaganda in the Egyptian media, agitated the Libyan people, so al-Muntasir decided to commence the negotiations of evacuation with Great Britain and United States, and Maziq was assigned to run the negotiations. Unexpectedly, when Maziq was attending an Arab summit in Cairo the same year, President Nasser told him, after an American pressure on Nasser, not to be in a rush to eject the American forces from Libya. This meant actually suspension of the evacuation's negotiations. Maziq told the story of this meeting while defending himself at the Libyan People's Court in 1970.

== Prime Ministership ==
On 20 March 1965, al-Muntasir resigned for health reasons. Maziq was assigned now to form the government. He continued executing the five-year plan for development (1963–1968) as the two former governments did. But he still dislikes some men around the King. Although Busairi El Shalhi had already died in a car accident in 1964, another man is still there, named Abdullah Abid es Senussi. Maziq sent to King Idris a report about Abdullah Abid's financial violations.

Unfortunately, troubles came again. After the defeat of the Arab countries at the Six-Day War in June 1967, many Libyans, angry and depressed, attacked the U.S. and British embassies, and attacked bloodily the Jews in Libya, thus Maziq had to permit the Jews to leave the country. At last, King Idris asked him to resign, and so he did on 29 June.

== Trial and death ==
For the rest of the Kingdom era, Maziq headed no posts. He was abroad when the coup d'état of 1 September 1969 occurred. However, he returned and, like most officials from the Kingdom era, was placed on trial in the Libyan People's Court and later imprisoned. In court he defended his relationship with King Idris. Maziq was sentenced to a ten-year prison sentence in 1971, but he was released in 1974.

Maziq lived the rest of his life at his home in Benghazi. He died on 12 May 2006, aged 87.
