= As-Siddig al-Mutassir =

Libyan politician

As-Siddig al-Muntassir
- Seddik Muntasser (center) with Mahmud al-Muntasir (left) and Sheikh AbdelHamid Ashur (right)

Minister of Defence
- In office 26 May 1957 – 24 April 1958
- Preceded by: Abdul Qadir al-Allam
- Succeeded by: Ibrahim Ben Shaaban

Permanent representative of Libya to the United Nations
- In office 1955–1957
- Preceded by: none

Governor of Tripolitania
- In office 13 June 1953 – 3 December 1954
- Preceded by: Fadhil Ben Zekri
- Succeeded by: Abdul Salam al-Buseiri

Personal details
- Born: 1912
- Died: 1979 (aged 66–67)

As-Siddig Al-Muntaser (also spelled Al-Seddik Al-Muntasser, or Saddiq Muntasser) (1912–1979) (Arabic: الصدّيق المنتصر) was a Libyan politician that held many senior positions in the era of the Kingdom of Libya (1951–1969) including the governor of Tripolitania and the Minister of Defense. He was an ambassador of the Kingdom of Libya to the United States of America and the first ambassador of Libya to the United Nations, he also served as an ambassador to Egypt and Germany at different times.
