= Muhammad Sakizli =

Libyan politician (1892–1976)

Muhammad Sakizli محمد الساقزلي
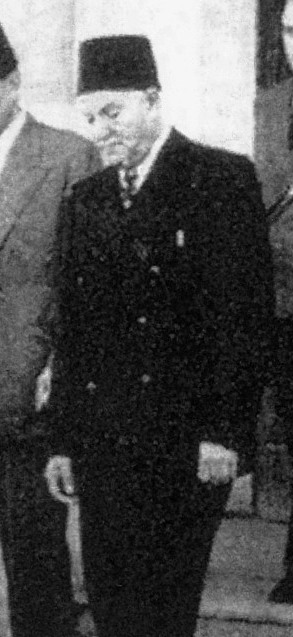

Prime Minister of Libya
- In office 19 February 1954 – 12 April 1954
- Monarch: Idris
- Preceded by: Mahmud al-Muntasir
- Succeeded by: Mustafa Ben Halim

Foreign Minister of Libya
- In office 19 February 1954 – 12 April 1954
- Prime Minister: Himself
- Preceded by: Mahmud al-Muntasir
- Succeeded by: Abdul Salam al-Buseiri

Prime Minister of Cyrenaica Emirate
- In office 18 March 1950 – 24 December 1951
- Preceded by: Omar Mansour El-Kikhia
- Succeeded by: Independence of Libya

Governor of Cyrenaica
- In office December 1951 – May 1952
- Preceded by: none
- Succeeded by: Hussein Maziq
- In office December 1962 – April 1963
- Preceded by: Mahmud Buhedma
- Succeeded by: none

Personal details
- Born: 1892
- Died: 14 January 1976 (aged 83–84)

Muhammad Sakizli (Arabic: محمد الساقزلي) (1892–14 January 1976) was the Prime Minister of Cyrenaica from 18 March 1950 to 24 December 1951. He was later appointed the Prime Minister of Libya from 19 February to 12 April 1954.

== Personal life ==
Sakizli was of Turkish descent. His surname known in Ottoman Turkish as Sakız hence his epithet "Sakızlı".

== Government of Cyrenaica ==
On 1 June 1949, emir Idris declared the "independence" of the Emirate of Cyrenaica. Although this independence could be considered nominal because of the high British influence, forming a new government was necessary. After a short-lived government under Omar Pasha Mansour El-Kikhia, Muhammad Sakizli formed a new cabinet in March 1950. After King Idris I of Libya declared its independence 24 December 1951, Sakizli's title changed to be "Governor" of Cyrenaica and remained in that post until May 1952. In May 1952, Sakizli was appointed minister of education in the Libyan federal government. Then, In September 1953, he was appointed the chief of the royal bureau.

== Prime minister ==
In February 1954, Sakizli was assigned to form a government, but his cabinet didn't persist for long. On 5 April 1954, The Libyan supreme court issued the decision that the royal order, issued on 19 January 1954, ordering the legislative council of Tripolitania to be dissolved, was cancelled. Consequently, protests erupted in Tripoli, organized by Tripolitania's governor As-Siddig al-Mutassir, against the court's decision which cancelled the King Idris's order.

On 7 April, the cabinet was summoned, while the Tripoli protests were going on, and governor al-Mutassir was continuing to run the legislative elections, which means actually the defying of the court's decision. Consequently, Sakizli telephoned King Idris to order governor al-Mutassir to stop the elections, which, apparently, the King didn't agree with.

The next day, a royal message was delivered to Sakizli demanding his resignation.

== After the Premiership ==
Sakizli became the governor of Cyernaica again from 26 December 1962, to 26 April 1963, when the federal system in Libya was cancelled.

Sakizli died on 14 January 1976.
