= Order of Idris I =

Awarded by the King of Libya (formerly); Head of the House of Senussi (presently)
- Type: Order
- Established: 1947
- Royal house: Senussi
- Status: Currently constituted
- Head of the Order: Muhammad as-Senussi, Crown Prince of Libya
- Grades: Grand Collar; Grand Cordon

Precedence
- Next (higher): None (Highest)
- Next (lower): -
- Ribbon bar of the order

The Order of Idris I (Nishan al-Idris) was founded by Sayyid Muhammad Idris as-Senussi, Emir of Cyrenaica, in 1947. The Emir later became King Idris I in December 1951, when the United Kingdom of Libya was established. The order was the highest order of the kingdom until the kingdom collapsed in 1969.

The Order was awarded in two classes, namely Grand Collar, which is reserved for Kings and Heads of State, and Grand Cordon, which is reserved for consorts of Heads of State, princes and princesses and members of royal families.

It continues as a dynastic order.
