= Wahbi al-Bouri =

Libyan politician, diplomat, writer and translator

Wahbi El-Bouri وهبي البوري

Foreign Minister of Libya
- In office 26 May 1957 – 11 October 1958
- Prime Minister: Abdul Majid Kubar
- Preceded by: Abdul Majid Kubar
- Succeeded by: Abdul Majid Kubar
- In office 20 March – 2 October 1965
- Prime Minister: Hussein Maziq
- Preceded by: Hussein Maziq
- Succeeded by: Ahmad Bishti

Justice Minister of Libya
- In office 3 May 1961 – 11 October 1962
- Prime Minister: Muhammad Osman Said
- Preceded by: Abdur Rahman al-Galhoud
- Succeeded by: Omar Mahmud al-Muntasir

Petroleum Minister of Libya
- In office 11 October 1962 – 13 November 1963
- Prime Minister: Muhammad Osman Said; Mohieddin Fikini
- Preceded by: Anwar Ben Gharsa
- Succeeded by: Ali Aneizi

Personal details
- Born: 23 January 1916 Alexandria, Egypt
- Died: 7 June 2010 (aged 94) Benghazi, Libya

Wahbi Ahmed El-Bouri (Arabic: وهبي البوري; 23 January 1916 – 7 June 2010) was a Libyan politician, diplomat, writer and translator. He was the foreign minister of Libya from 1957 to 1958 and later from 1965 to 1966. He was also a petroleum minister of Libya and a Libyan Ambassador in the United Nations and the founder of the Islamic Cultural Center of New York the first mosque and Islamic school in the city - 1967 also nominated by the king as a Prime Minister in 1969.

== Biography ==
Wahbi El-Bouri was an accomplished writer and is considered by many to be the father of the short story genre in Libya. He also wrote essays and other works of non-fiction on history and politics. He also translated a number of books in Italian about Libya. After his death Dr El-Bouri continued to be a character of inspiration for many Libyans to learn from his lifetime experience in Public Service as he served his country for almost 85 years and the numerous books he left behind, in 2011 after the Libyan uprising his family published his biography “Memories of my life”. In Jan 2017 El- Bouri's grandson Zeid Basyouni and the El-Bouri family announced the establishment of the El-Bouri Foundation to continue Wahbi El-Bouri's legacy as manifest in his great generosity of spirit which remained his trait up and aims to encourage and support young minds in the field of Writing, Literature, Public Service and Leadership.
