= Barasa–Ubaidat War =

1860–1890 war in Libya

The Barasa–Ubaidat War (Arabic: حرب البراعصة والعبيدات) refers to a military conflict that took place between 1860 and 1890 in northern Cyrenaica, Libya between the tribes of Barasa and Ubaidat. The Barasa were initially successful but the final victory went to the Ubaidat.

== Historical background ==
The Ubaidat had already been engaged (probably in the eighteenth century) in a large-scale war with their eastern neighbours, the tribe of Aulad-Ali, which is also descended from the Banu-Su'da tribe of the Banu Sulaym tribe from Arabia). The war ended with the defeat of Aulad-Ali and their expulsion from the whole of Cyrenaica to Egypt. This war has been known in the Libyan folklore as "Tajridat Habeeb".

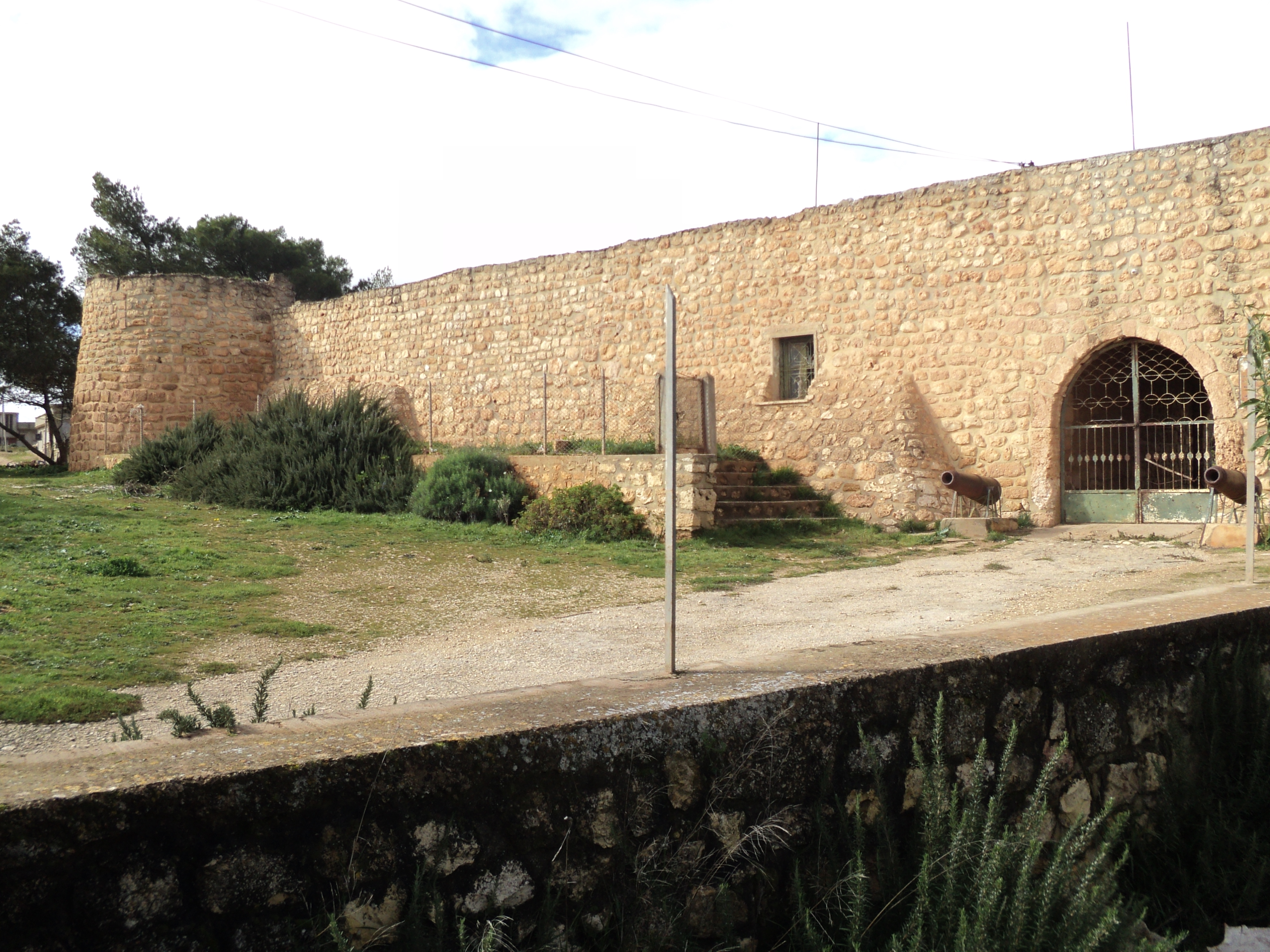
Abubakr Haddouth's citadel at Qayqab.

In 1844, Abubakr Haddouth, the leader of Barasa, the descendants of Idrisids of Morocco, was appointed by the Ottoman Empire as a Bey over all the Harabi tribes (Barasa, Ubaidat, Hassa, Drissa, Fayed family, and Aulad-Hamad). The Ubaidat considered Abubakr to be cruel, and thus resented being under his influence. Conflict was inevitable.

== Course of War ==
The war began in 1860. Despite Turkish support of Ubaidat, the Barasa, successful at first, advanced through Ubaidat's territory to "Ain Mara" where they met a heavy and decisive defeat. The war ended in 1890, with the loss of 2,000 lives from both sides, including two of Abubakr's brothers. Little information is available about this long war.

Abubakr did not survive to see the end of the war, he moved to Benghazi and died there in 1870.

== Legacy ==
This was not the only war between tribes in Cyrenaica. Wars like the Barasa-Ubaidat war were conventional there. The Barasa-Ubaidat war was the nineteenth century version of the Basus War. With the coming of Mohammed ben Ali es Senussi, founder of the Senussi order in the nineteenth century, to Cyrenaica the number of wars had gradually diminished. When the Italians invaded Libya in 1911, Senussi leaders had no difficulty in unifying the tribes' efforts against the invaders.

Again, like the Basus War, poetry and exaggerated tales are the main remnants or anything close to an account of this war.
