= Wanis al-Qaddafi =

Prime Minister of Libya from 1968 to 1969

- ونيس القذافي
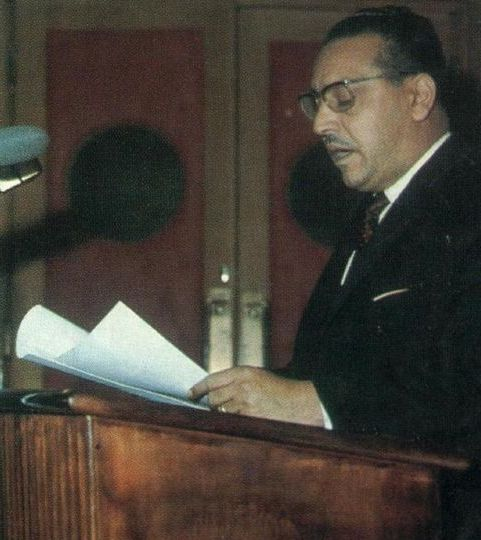
- Qaddafi in 1968

Prime Minister of Libya
- In office 4 September 1968 – 31 August 1969
- Monarch: Idris of Libya
- Preceded by: Abdul Hamid al-Bakkoush
- Succeeded by: Mahmud Sulayman al-Maghribi

Foreign Minister of Libya
- In office 27 January 1962 – 6 March 1963
- Prime Minister: Muhammad Osman Said
- Preceded by: Sulaiman Jerbi
- Succeeded by: Omar Mahmud al-Muntasir
- In office 4 January – 4 September 1968
- Prime Minister: Abdul Hamid al-Bakkoush
- Preceded by: Ahmad Bishti
- Succeeded by: Shams ad-Din Orabi

Interior Minister of Libya
- In office 6 March 1963 – 22 January 1964
- Prime Minister: Muhammad Osman Said; Mohieddin Fikini
- Preceded by: Ahmed Awn Sawf
- Succeeded by: Mahmud al-Muntasir

Housing Minister of Libya (acting)
- In office 1 July 1967 – 4 January 1964
- Prime Minister: Abdul Qadir al-Badri; Abdul Hamid al-Bakkoush
- Preceded by: Abdul Qadir al-Badri
- Succeeded by: Anwar Sassi

Personal details
- Born: 22 November 1922 Italian Cyrenaica
- Died: 1 December 1986 (aged 64) Switzerland

Wanis al-Qaddafi (Arabic: ونيس القذافي; 22 November 1922 – 1 December 1986) was a Libyan politician. He held many positions in the era of the Kingdom of Libya and was the tenth Prime Minister of Libya from 4 September 1968 to 31 August 1969, when his government was overthrown by Muammar Gaddafi (no relation).

== Biography ==
Qaddafi was born in Benghazi, Italian Cyrenaica, in 1922. During the Italian colonial period, an Italian lawyer trained him for a career in law. According to some accounts, during the Second World War he fled with his family to Sudan, only returning to his country after it was occupied by the British. The young Qaddafi was taken up by the Allied Forces overseeing the administration of Benghazi and was the first Libyan to be recruited by the British for the political administration of Cyrenaica. Following the independence of Libya in 1951, he became a provincial minister in Cyrenaica, first of health, later of justice and transportation, and chaired Cyrenaica's Executive Council.

A friend of Idris of Libya, the post-war national leader, in 1962–1963 he was Minister of Foreign Affairs, then Interior Minister. In 1964, he served for a short time as Labor Minister before being appointed as ambassador to West Germany. Finally, in September 1968, he became the last Prime Minister of the Kingdom of Libya, replacing Abdul Hamid al-Bakkoush, whose reforms had alienated some conservative elements.

On 17 November 1968, Qaddafi opened the fifth session of the Libyan National Assembly in Bayda and gave the annual prime minister's speech from the throne, emphasizing the themes of "stability, prosperity, and progress".

Qaddafi was ousted from office by a coup d'état against King Idris on 1 September 1969, and was sentenced by the Libyan People's Court to two years in prison. He returned to private life after his release and died of a heart attack in Switzerland in December 1986, aged 64.

=== Family ===
Wanis al-Qaddafi was married to Amal, the daughter of Omar Faiek Shennib, from the distinguished House of Shennib. She founded a high school in 1961 and worked as headmistress there until she resigned in 1974 to look after Wanis, who had suffered a heart attack. After Wanis' death in 1986, she continued to live in their modest house in Benghazi, Libya.

In 1977, Al-Qaddafi's eldest son Majid, fled to the United States following his involvement in the April 1976 demonstrations against the Gaddafi regime at Benghazi's Gar Younis university which saw hundreds of student demonstrators killed or imprisoned. Identified as a key protester, Majid Al A-Qaddafi found safe passage to the US and eventually settling in Portland, Oregon where he kept a low profile. He was allowed to return to Libya in 1994. After the killing of Muammar Gaddafi in 2011, Majid emerged as a leading federalist. He died in August 2012.

Al-Qaddafi's younger son, Mohsen Al-Qaddafi fared less well. In 1981, at age 13, he became involved in a plot against Qaddafi. The plot was discovered and its leaders executed. Others were sentenced to life imprisonment. Mohsen was imprisoned at the age of fourteen and passed the next seven years in jail, as Qaddafi's youngest political prisoner. Soon after his release in 1988, he was smuggled to Tunisia by his family to study in Egypt and eventually joined his elder brother in the United States.
