= Abdul Majid Kabar =

Libyan politician

Abdul Majid Kabar عبد المجيد كعبار
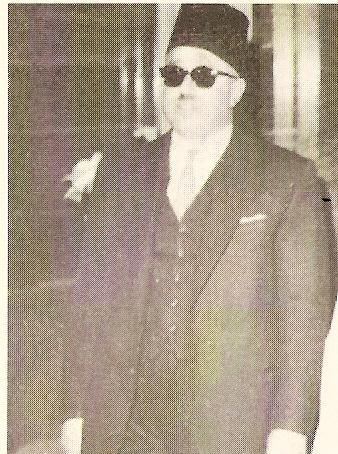

4th Prime Minister of Libya
- In office 26 May 1957 – 17 October 1960
- Monarch: Idris
- Preceded by: Mustafa Ben Halim
- Succeeded by: Muhammad Osman Said

Foreign Minister of Libya
- In office 14 March – 26 May 1957
- Prime Minister: Mustafa Ben Halim
- Preceded by: Ali Sahli
- Succeeded by: Wahbi al-Bouri
- In office 11 October 1958 – 16 October 1960
- Prime Minister: Himself
- Preceded by: Wahbi al-Bouri
- Succeeded by: Abdul Qadir Allam

Transport Minister of Libya
- In office 26 April 1955 – 26 March 1956
- Prime Minister: Mustafa Ben Halim
- Preceded by: Ali Sahli
- Succeeded by: Salem Lutfi el-Qadi

Personal details
- Born: 9 May 1909 Ottoman Tripolitania (now Libya)
- Died: 4 October 1988 (aged 79)

Abdul Majid Kabar (Adyghe: Къэбэр Абдулмэджид, romanized: Qəbər Abdulmədjid; Arabic: عبد المجيد كعبار / ʿbd āl-Mağid Kaʿbār ) (9 May 1909 – 4 October 1988) was a Libyan politician. He served as the Prime Minister of Libya from 26 May 1957 to 17 October 1960. He was of Circassian origin.

== Career ==
Kabar worked his way up in Tripolitanian politics until he was appointed a member of the National Constituent Assembly in 1950. In the 1952 Libyan general election, its first, he entered parliament and served as the house speaker until he became prime minister in 1957. A financial scandal centred on the cost of a road being built from Fezzan to Sabha led to his downfall. Originally cost $5.3 million and scheduled to be completed in three years, the cost overruns led to later estimates of three times the cost. Fearing a vote of no confidence, he resigned in 1960.
