= Abdul Salam al-Buseiri =

Libyan politician (1898–1978)

Abdul Salam al-Buseiri عبد السلام البوصيري

Foreign Minister of Libya
- In office 11 April – 3 December 1954
- Prime Minister: Mustafa Ben Halim
- Preceded by: Muhammad Sakizli
- Succeeded by: Mustafa Ben Halim

Governor of Tripolitania
- In office 3 December 1954 – 15 April 1955
- Preceded by: As-Siddig al-Mutassir
- Succeeded by: Mohammed Bash Imam

Abdul Salam al-Buseiri (Arabic: عبد السلام البوصيري) (1898 – 1978) was the Foreign Minister of Libya from 1954 to 1957.

He became Governor of Tripoli (1954–1955), and then Ambassador of Libya to London.
