= Shams ad-Din Orabi =

Libyan politician

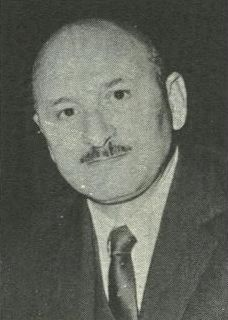

Foreign Minister of Libya
- In office 4 September 1968 – June 1969
- Prime Minister: Wanis al-Qaddafi
- Preceded by: Wanis al-Qaddafi
- Succeeded by: Ali Hussnein

Personal details
- Died: 5 May 2009

Shams ad-Din Orabi (Arabic: شمس الدين عرابي) was a Libyan politician. He was a foreign minister of the Kingdom of Libya (September 1968 – June 1969), Libya ambassador for Italy, Egypt, Algeria, Brother of Asad Bin Omran, and founder of the Omar al-Mukhtar foundation. He died in London on May 5, 2009.
