= Idris of Libya =

King of Libya from 1951 to 1969

Idris I
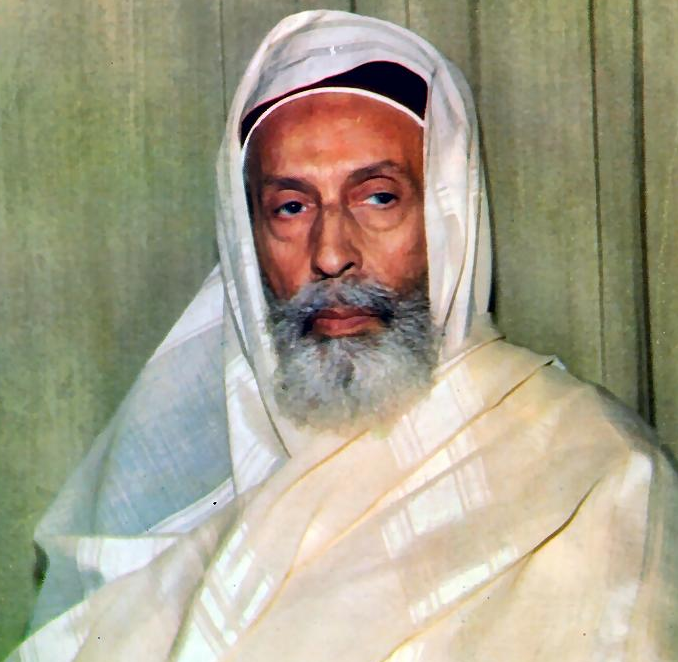
- King Idris in 1960

King of Libya
- Reign: 24 December 1951 – 1 September 1969
- Predecessor: Himself (as Emir of Cyrenaica)
- Successor: Muammar Gaddafi (as Brotherly Leader and Guide of the Revolution of Libya)
- Prime ministers: See list: Mahmud al-Muntasir Muhammad Sakizli Mustafa Ben Halim Abdul Majid Kubar Muhammad Osman Said Mohieddin Fikini Hussein Maziq Abdul Qadir al-Badri Abdul Hamid al-Bakkoush Wanis al-Qaddafi

Emir of Cyreniaca
- Reign: 1 March 1949 – 24 December 1951
- Successor: Himself as King of Libya
- Born: 13 March 1890; Jaghbub, Tripolitania Vilayet, Ottoman Empire
- Died: 25 May 1983 (aged 93); Cairo, Egypt
- Burial: Al-Baqi' Cemetery, Medina, Saudi Arabia
- Spouse: Aisha bint Muhammad as-Sharif al-Sanussi; (m. 1896/97; died 1905/1907); Sakina bint Muhammad as-Sharif al-Sanussi (m. 1907; div. 1922) Nafisa bint Ahmad Abu al-Qasim al-Isawi (m. 1911; div. 1915) Fatima el-Sharif (m. 1931) Aliya Khanum Effendi (m. 1955; div. 1958)
- Issue: 5 children (4 sons, 1 daughter), all died in infancy
Names
- Muhammad Idris bin Muhammad al-Mahdi as-Senussi
- House: Senussi
- Father: Muhammad al-Mahdi as-Senussi
- Mother: Aisha bint Muqarrib al-Barasa
- Religion: Sunni Islam

Idris (Arabic: إدريس, romanized: Idrīs, Muhammad Idris bin Muhammad al-Mahdi al-Sanusi; 13 March 1890 – 25 May 1983) was King of Libya from 24 December 1951 until his ousting in the 1969 Libyan revolution. He ruled over the United Kingdom of Libya from 1951 to 1963, after which the country became known as simply the Kingdom of Libya. Idris had served as Emir of Cyrenaica and Tripolitania from the 1920s until 1951. He also headed the Sanusi order.

Idris was born into the Senussi Order. When his cousin Ahmed Sharif as-Senussi abdicated as leader of the Order, Idris took his position. The Senussi campaign was taking place, with the British and Italians fighting the Order. Idris put an end to the hostilities and, through the Modus vivendi of Acroma, abandoned Ottoman protection. Between 1919 and 1920, Italy recognized Senussi control over most of Cyrenaica in exchange for the recognition of Italian sovereignty by Idris. Idris then led his Order in an unsuccessful attempt to conquer the eastern part of the Tripolitanian Republic.

Following the Second World War, the United Nations General Assembly called for Libya to be granted independence. It established the United Kingdom of Libya through the unification of Cyrenaica, Tripolitania and Fezzan, appointing Idris to rule it as king. Wielding significant political influence in the impoverished country, Idris banned political parties and, in 1963, replaced Libya's federal system with a unitary state. He established links to the Western powers, allowing the United Kingdom and United States to open military bases in the country in return for economic aid. After oil was discovered in Libya in 1959, he oversaw the emergence of a growing oil industry that rapidly aided economic growth. Idris's regime was weakened by growing Arab nationalist and Arab socialist sentiment in Libya as well as rising frustration at the country's high levels of corruption and close links with Western nations. While in Turkey for medical treatment, Idris was deposed in the 1969 Libyan revolution led by army officers under Muammar Gaddafi.

== Early life ==
Idris was born at Al-Jaghbub, the headquarters of the Senussi movement, on 12 March 1889 (although some sources give the year as 1890), a son of Sayyid Muhammad al-Mahdi bin Sayyid Muhammad al-Senussi and his third wife Aisha bint Muqarrib al-Barasa. He was a grandson of Sayyid Muhammad ibn Ali as-Senussi, the founder of the Senussi Muslim Sufi Order and the Senussi tribe in North Africa. Idris's family claimed descent from the Islamic prophet Muhammad through his daughter, Fatimah. The Senussi were a revivalist Sunni Islamic sect who were based largely in Cyrenaica, a region in present-day eastern Libya. The Ottoman Sultan Abdul Hamid II sent his aide-de-camp Azmzade Sadik El Mueyyed to Jaghbub in 1886 and to Kufra in 1895 to cultivate positive relations with the Senussi and to counter the West European scramble for Africa. By the end of the nineteenth century the Senussi Order had established a government in Cyrenaica, unifying its tribes, controlling its pilgrimage and trade routes, and collecting taxes.

In 1916, Idris became chief of the Senussi order, following the abdication of his cousin Sayyid Ahmed Sharif es Senussi. He was recognized by the British under the new title "emir" of the territory of Cyrenaica, a position also confirmed by the Italians in 1920. He was also installed as Emir of Tripolitania on 28 July 1922.

== Head of the Senussi Order: 1916–1922 ==
The traditional provinces of Libya; Idris was from the eastern province of Cyrenaica

After the Regio Esercito (the Italian Royal Army) invaded Cyrenaica in 1913 as part of their wider invasion of Libya, the Senussi Order fought back against them. When the Order's leader, Ahmed Sharif as-Senussi, abdicated his position, he was replaced by Idris, who was his cousin. Pressured to do so by the Ottoman Empire, Ahmed had pursued armed attacks against British military forces stationed in the neighbouring Sultanate of Egypt (formerly known, until December 1914, as the Khedivate of Egypt). On taking power, Idris put a stop to these attacks. Instead he established a tacit alliance with the British Empire, which would last for half a century and accord his Order de facto diplomatic status. Using the British as intermediaries, Idris led the Order into negotiations with the Italians in July 1916. These resulted in two agreements, at al-Zuwaytina in April 1916 and at Akrama in April 1917. The latter of these treaties left most of inland Cyrenaica under the control of the Senussi Order. Relations between the Senussi Order and the newly established Tripolitanian Republic were acrimonious. The Senussi attempted to militarily extend their power into eastern Tripolitania, resulting in a pitched battle at Bani Walid in which the Senussi were forced to withdraw back into Cyrenaica.

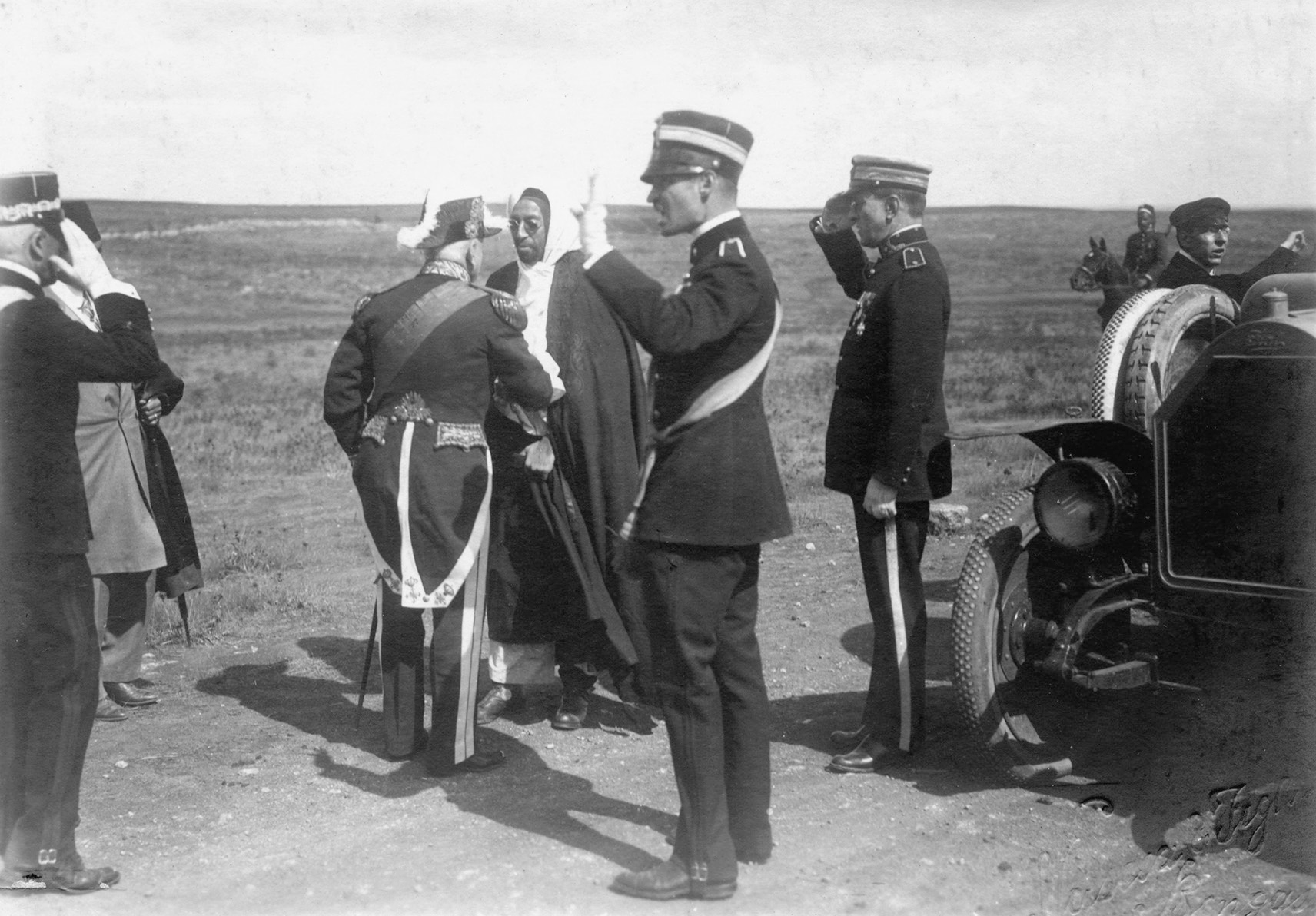
Idris with Italian soldiers

At the end of the First World War, the Ottoman Empire ceded their claims over Libya to the Kingdom of Italy. Italy, however, was facing serious economic, social, and political problems domestically, and was not prepared to re-launch its military activities in Libya. It issued statutes known as the Legge Fondamentale, for the Tripolitanian Republic in June 1919 and Cyrenaica in October 1919. These were a compromise by which all Libyans were accorded the right to joint Libyan-Italian citizenship, while each province was to have its own parliament and governing council. The Senussi were largely happy with this arrangement and Idris visited Rome as part of the celebrations to mark the promulgation of the settlement. In October 1920, further negotiations between Italy and Cyrenaica resulted in the Accord of al-Rajma, in which Idris was given the title of Emir of Cyrenaica and permitted to administer autonomously the oases around Kufra, Jalu, Jaghbub, Awjila, and Ajdabiya. As part of the Accord he was given a monthly stipend by the Italian government, who agreed to take responsibility for policing and administration of areas under Senussi control. The Accord also stipulated that Idris must fulfill the requirements of the Legge Fondamentale by disbanding the Cyrenaican military units, but he did not comply with this. By the end of 1921, relations between the Senussi Order and the Italian government had again deteriorated.

Following the death of Tripolitanian leader Ramadan Asswehly in August 1920, the Republic descended into civil war. Many tribal leaders in the region recognized that this discord was weakening the region's chances of attaining full autonomy from Italy, and, in November 1920, they met in Gharyan to bring an end to the violence. In January 1922, they agreed to request that Idris extend the Emirate of Cyrenaica into Tripolitania in order to bring stability; they presented a formal document with this request on 28 July 1922. Idris's advisers were divided on whether he should accept the offer or not. Doing so would contravene the al-Rajma Agreement and would damage relations with the Italian government, who opposed the political unification of Cyrenaica and Tripolitania as being against their interests. Nevertheless, in November 1922, Idris agreed to the proposal.

== Exile: 1922–1951 ==
Following the agreement, Emir Idris feared that Italy—under its new Fascist leader Benito Mussolini—would militarily retaliate against the Senussi Order, and so he went into exile in the newly established Kingdom of Egypt (formerly known as the Sultanate of Egypt) in December 1922. Soon, the Italian reconquest of Libya began, and, by the end of 1922, the only effective anti-colonial resistance to the occupation was concentrated in the Cyrenaican hinterlands. The Italians subjugated the Libyan people; Cyrenaica's livestock was decimated, a large portion of its population was interned in concentration camps, and, in 1930 and 1931, an estimated 12,000 Cyrenaicans were executed by the Regio Esercito (Italian Royal Army). The Italian government implemented a policy of "demographic colonization", by which tens of thousands of Italians were relocated to Libya, largely to establish farms.

The Cyrenaican flag used between 1949 and 1951

Following the outbreak of the Second World War in September 1939, Idris supported the United Kingdom—which was now at war with Italy—in the hope of ridding his country of Italian occupation. He argued that even if the Italians were victorious, the situation for the Libyan people would be no different than it had been before the war. Delegates from both the Cyrenaicans and Tripolitanians agreed that Idris should conclude agreements with the British that they would gain independence in return for support during the war. Privately, Idris did not promote the idea of Libyan independence to the British, instead suggesting that it become a British protectorate akin to Transjordan. A Libyan Arab Force, consisting of five infantry battalions made up of volunteers, was established to aid the British war effort. With the exception of one military engagement near to Benghazi, this force's role did not extend beyond support and gendarmerie duties.

After the defeat of the Italian armies, Libya was left under the military control of British and French forces. They governed the area until 1949 according to the Hague Convention of 1907. In 1946, a National Congress was established to lay the groundwork for independence; it was dominated by the Senussi Order. Under British and French pressure, Italy relinquished its claim of sovereignty over the country in 1947, although still hoping that they would be permitted a trusteeship over Tripolitania. The European powers drew up the Bevin-Sforza plan, which proposed that France retain a ten-year trusteeship in Fezzan, the UK in Cyrenaica, and Italy in Tripolitania. After the plans were published in May 1949, they generated violent demonstrations in Tripolitania and Cyrenaica and drew protests from the United States, Soviet Union, and other Arab states. In September 1948, the question of Libya's future was brought to the United Nations General Assembly, which rejected the principles of the Bevin-Sforza plan, instead indicating support for full independence. At the time neither the UK nor France supported the principle of Libyan unification, with France being keen to retain colonial control of Fezzan. In 1949, the British unilaterally declared that they would leave Cyrenaica and grant it independence under the control of Idris; by doing so they believed that it would remain under their own sphere of influence. Similarly, France established a provisional government in Fezzan in February 1950.

In November 1949, the UN General Assembly adopted a resolution on Libyan independence, stipulating that it must come into being by January 1952. The resolution called for Libya to become a single state led by Idris, who was to be declared king of Libya. He had been reluctant to accept the position. Both the United Kingdom and the United States—who were committed to preventing any growth in Soviet influence in the southern Mediterranean—agreed to this for their own Cold War strategic reasons. They recognised that while they would be able to establish military bases in an independent Libyan state sympathetic to their interests, they would have been unable to do so were Libya to have entered UN-sponsored trusteeship. The Tripolitanians—largely united under Selim Muntasser and the United National Front—agreed to this plan in order to avoid further European colonial rule. The concept of a kingdom would be alien to Libyan society, where the loyalties to the family, tribe, and region—or alternately to the global Muslim community—were far stronger than to any concept of Libyan nationhood.

== King of Libya: 1951–1969 ==
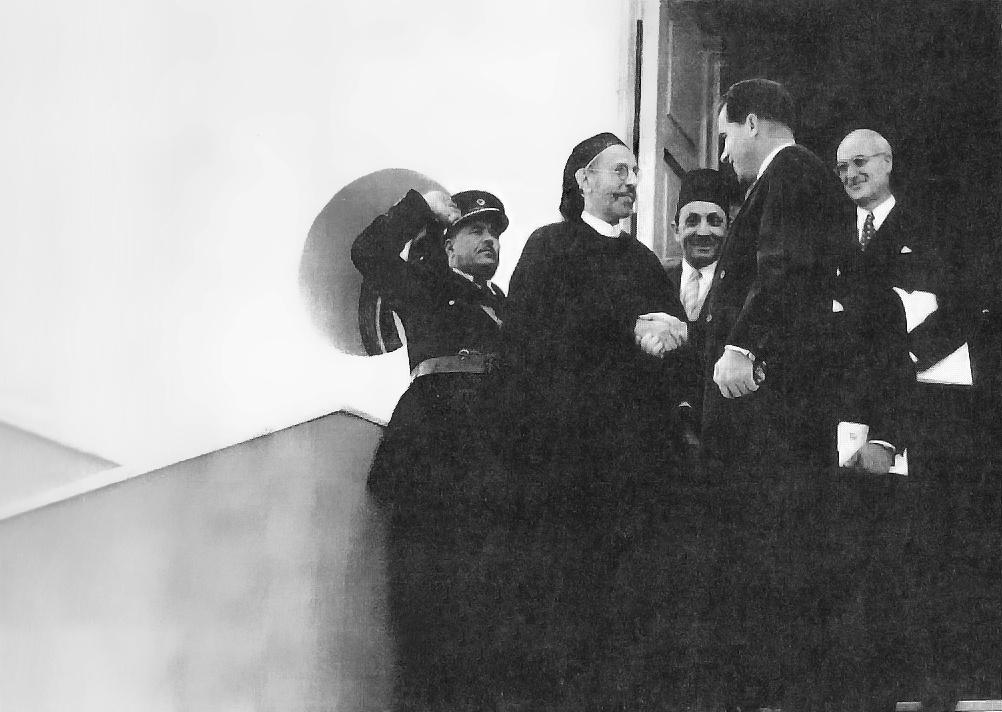
King Idris with then-U.S. Vice-president Richard Nixon (March 1957)

On 24 December 1951, Idris announced the establishment of the United Kingdom of Libya from the al-Manar Palace in Benghazi. The country had a population of approximately one million, the majority of whom were Arabs, but with Berber, Tebu, Sephardi Jewish, Greek, Turkish, and Italian minorities. The newly established state faced serious problems; in 1951, Libya was one of the world's poorest countries. Much of its infrastructure had been destroyed by war, it had very little trade and high unemployment, and both a 40% infant mortality rate and a 94% illiteracy rate. Only 1% of Libya's land mass was arable, with another 3–4% being used for pastoral farming. Although the three provinces had been united, they shared little common aspiration.

The Kingdom was established along federal lines, something that Cyrenaica and Fezzan had insisted upon, fearing that they would otherwise be dominated by Tripolitania, where two-thirds of the Libyan population lived. Conversely, the Tripolitanians had largely favoured a unitary state, believing that it would allow the government to act more effectively in the national interest and fearing that a federal system would result in further British and French domination of Libya. The three provinces had their own legislative authorities; while that of Fezzan was composed entirely of elected officials, those of Cyrenaica and Tripolitania contained a mix of elected and non-elected representatives. This constitutional framework left Libya with a weak central government and strong provincial autonomy. The governments of successive Prime Ministers tried to push through economic policies but found them hampered by the differing provinces. There remained a persistent distrust between Cyrenaica and Tripolitania. Benghazi and Tripoli were appointed as joint capital cities, with the country's parliament moving between the two. The city of Bayda also became a de facto summer capital as Idris moved there.

According to the reporter Jonathan Bearman, King Idris was "nominally a constitutional monarch" but in practice was "a spiritual leader with autocratic temporal power", with Libya being a "monarchical dictatorship" rather than a constitutional monarchy or parliamentary democracy. The new constitution granted Idris significant personal power, and he remained a crucial player in the country's political system. Idris ruled via a palace cabinet, namely his royal diwan, which contained a chef de cabinet, two deputies, and senior advisers. This diwan worked in consultation with the federal government to determine the policies of the Libyan state.

King Idris was a self-effacing devout Muslim; he refused to allow his portrait to be featured on Libyan currency and also insisted that nothing should be named after him except the Tripoli Idris Airport. Idris's regime soon banned political parties from operating in the country, claiming that they exacerbated internal instability. From 1952 onward, all candidates for election were government nominees. In 1954, the Prime Minister Mustafa Ben Halim suggested that Libya be converted from a federal to a unitary system and that Idris be proclaimed President for Life. Idris recognised that this would deal with the problems caused by federalism and would put a stop to the intrigues among the Senussi family surrounding his succession. He asked Ben Halim to produce a formal draft for these plans, but the idea was dropped amid opposition from Cyrenaican tribal chiefs.

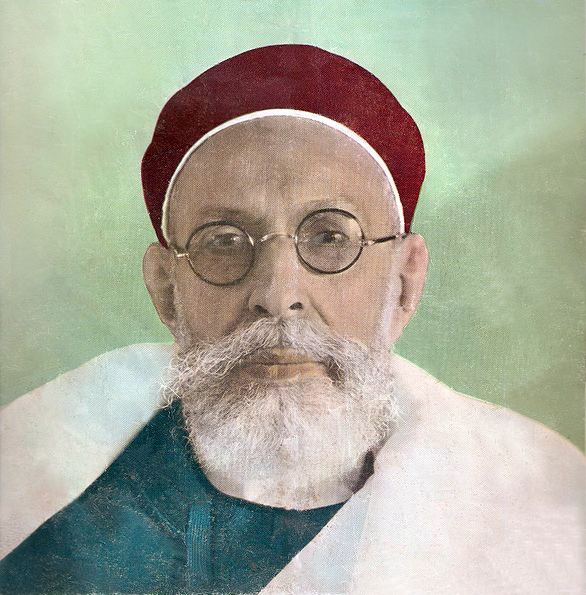
King Idris on the cover of the Libyan Al Iza'a magazine, 15 August 1965

Under King Idris, Libya found itself within the Western sphere of influence. It became the recipient of Western expertise and aid, and, by the end of 1959, it had received over $100 million of aid from the United States, being the single largest per capita recipient of American aid. U.S. companies would also play a leading role in the development of the Libyan oil industry. This support was provided on a quid pro quo basis, and in return Libya granted the United States and United Kingdom usage of the Wheelus Air Base and the al-Adem Air Base. This reliance on the Western nations placed Libya at odds with the growing Arab nationalist and Arab socialist sentiment across the Arab world. The Arab nationalist sentiment promoted by Radio Cairo found a particularly receptive audience in Tripolitania. In July 1967, anti-Western riots broke out in Tripoli and Benghazi to protest the West's support of Israel against the Arab states in the Six-Day War. Many oil workers across Libya went on strike in solidarity with the Arab forces fighting Israel.

During the 1950s, a number of foreign companies began prospecting for oil in Libya, with the country's government passing the Minerals Law of 1953 and then the Petroleum Law of 1955 to regulate this process. In 1959, much larger oil reserves were discovered in Libya, which helped Idris transform the nation into one of the richest in the world. The 1955 law created conditions that enabled small oil companies to drill alongside larger corporations; each concession had a low entry fee, with rents only increasing significantly after the eighth year of drilling. This created a competitive atmosphere that prevented any one company from becoming crucial to the country's oil operation, although it had the downside of incentivising companies to produce as much oil as possible in as quick a period as possible. Libya's oil fields fuelled rapidly growing demand in Europe, and by 1967 it was supplying a third of the oil entering the West European market. Within a few years, Libya had grown to become the world's fourth largest oil producer. Oil production provided a huge boost to the Libyan economy; whereas the per capita annual income in 1951 had been $25–35, by 1969 it was $2,000. By 1961, the oil industry was exerting the greater influence over Libyan politics than any other issue. In 1962, Libya joined the Organization of the Petroleum Exporting Countries (OPEC). In ensuing years, the Libyan state furthered its control over the industry, establishing a Ministry of Petroleum Affairs in 1963 and then the Libyan National Oil Company. In 1968, they established the Libyan Petroleum Company (LIPETCO) and announced that any further concession agreements would have to be joint ventures with LIPETCO.

Libya experienced rampant corruption and favouritism. A number of high-profile corruption scandals impacted on the highest levels of Idris's government. In June 1960, Idris issued a public letter in which he condemned this corruption, claiming that bribery and nepotism "will destroy the very existence of the state and its good reputation both at home and abroad".

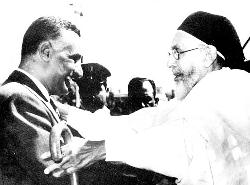
King Idris meeting President Nasser of Egypt

On April 26, 1963, King Idris abolished Libya's federal system. Both the provincial legislative assemblies and the provincial judicial systems were abolished. Doing so allowed him to concentrate economic and administrative planning at a centralised national level, and thenceforth all taxes and oil revenues were directed straight to the central government. As part of this reform, the "United Kingdom of Libya" was renamed the "Kingdom of Libya". This reform was not popular among many of Libya's provinces, which saw their power curtailed. According to the historian Dirk Vandewalle, this change was "the single most critical political act during the monarchy's tenure in office". The reform handed far greater political power to Idris than he had held previously. By the mid-1960s, Idris began to increasingly retreat from active involvement in the country's governance.

== Overthrow and exile ==
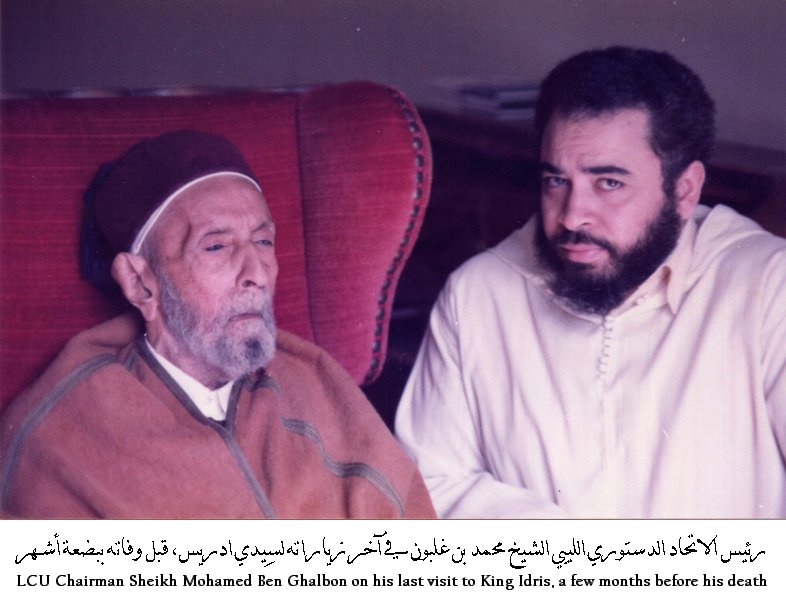
King Idris with Mohamed Ben Ghalbon towards the end of his life

On 1 September 1969, while King Idris was in Turkey for medical treatment, he was deposed in the 1969 Libyan revolution led by army officers under Muammar Gaddafi. The monarchy was abolished and a republic proclaimed. The coup pre-empted King Idris's intended abdication and the succession of his heir the following day. From Turkey, he and the Queen traveled to Kamena Vourla, Greece, by ship and went into exile in Egypt. After the 1969 coup, King Idris was put on trial in absentia in the Libyan People's Court and sentenced to death in November 1971.

Muammar Gaddafi's regime portrayed King Idris's administration as having been weak, inept, corrupt, anachronistic, and lacking in nationalist credentials, a view that would come to be widely adopted.

In 1983, at the age of 93, King Idris died in a hospital in the district of Dokki in Cairo. He was buried at Al-Baqi' Cemetery, Medina, Saudi Arabia.

== Legacy ==
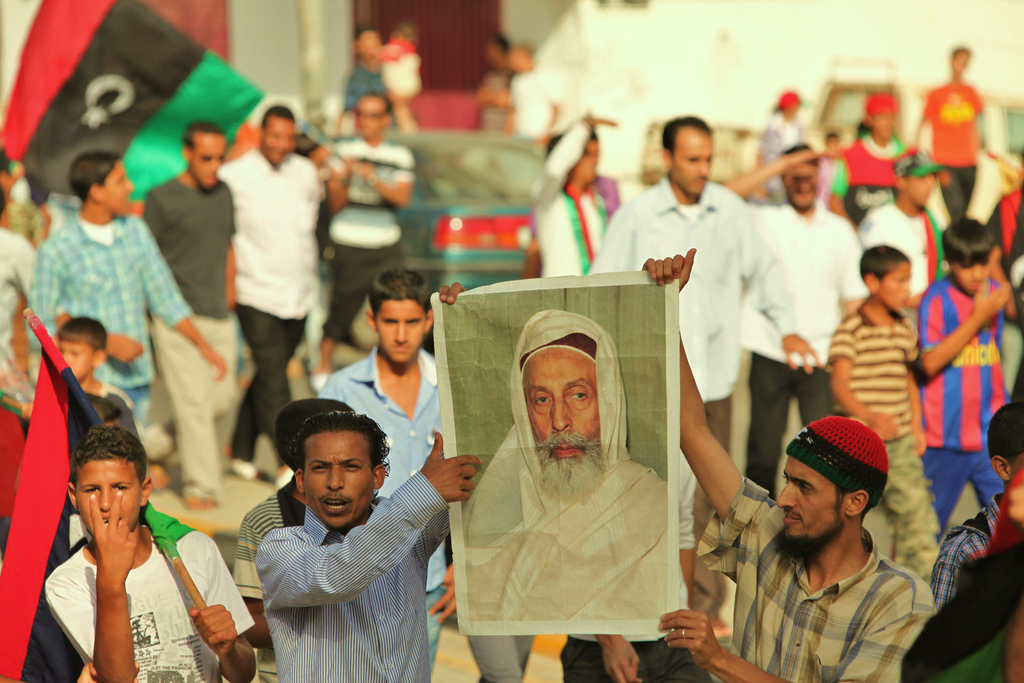
Citizens from Bayda, Libya, holding a photo of King Idris in 2011

According to Vandewalle, King Idris's monarchy "started Libya on the road of political exclusion of its citizens, and of a profound de-politicization" that still characterised the country in the first years of the 21st century. He informed the U.S. ambassador to Libya and an early academic researcher that he had not truly wanted to rule over a unified Libya.

Muammar Gaddafi's policies with regard to the oil industry would also be technocratic and bore many similarities with those of King Idris.

Although the King died in exile and most Libyans were born after his reign, during the Libyan Civil War, many demonstrators opposing Gaddafi carried portraits of the King, especially in Cyrenaica. The tricolour flag used during the era of the monarchy was frequently used as a symbol of the revolution and was re-adopted by the National Transitional Council as the official flag of Libya.

== Personal life ==
Vandewalle characterised King Idris as "a scholarly individual whose entire life would be marked by a reluctance to engage in politics". For Vandewalle, Idris was a "well meaning but reluctant ruler", as well as "a pious, deeply religious, and self-effacing man". The Libyan Prime Minister Ben Halim stated his view that "I was sure... that [Idris] sincerely wanted reform, but I knew from experience that he became hesitant when he felt that such reform would affect the interests of his entourage. He would gradually pull back until he abandoned the reform plans, moved by the whisperings of his entourage."

King Idris married five times:

1. At Kufra, 1896/1897, his cousin, Sayyida Aisha binti Sayyid Muhammad as-Sharif al-Sanussi (1873 Jaghbub – 1905 or 1907 Kufra), eldest daughter of Sayyid Muhammad as-Sharif bin Sayyid Muhammad al-Sanussi, by his fourth wife, Fatima, daughter of 'Umar bin Muhammad al-Ashhab, of Fezzan, by whom he had one son who died in infancy;
2. At Kufra, 1907 (divorced 1922), his cousin, Sakina, daughter of Muhammad as-Sharif, by whom he had one son and one daughter, both of whom died in infancy;
3. At Kufra, 1911 (divorced 1915), Nafisa, daughter of Ahmad Abu al-Qasim al-Isawi, by whom he had one son who died in infancy;
4. At Siwa, Egypt, 1931, his cousin, Sayyida Fatima al-Shi'fa binti Sayyid Ahmad as-Sharif al-Sanussi, Fatimah el-Sharif (1911 Kufra – 3 October 2009, Cairo, buried in Jannat al-Baqi, Medina, Saudi Arabia), fifth daughter of Field Marshal Sayyid Ahmad as-Sharif Pasha bin Sayyid Muhammad as-Sharif al-Senussi, 3rd Grand Seussi, by his second wife, Khadija, daughter of Ahmad al-Rifi, by whom he had one son, who died in infancy;
5. At the Libyan Embassy, Cairo, 6 June 1955 (divorced 20 May 1958), Aliya Khanum Effendi (1913 Guney, Egypt), daughter of Abdul-Qadir Lamlun Asadi Pasha.

For two short periods (1911–1922 and 1955–1958), King Idris kept two wives, marrying his fifth wife with a view to providing a direct heir.

King Idris fathered four sons and one daughter, none of whom survived childhood. He and Fatima adopted a daughter, Suleima, an Algerian orphan, who survived them.

== Honours ==
Royal Standard of the King of Libya

Idris was grand master of the following Libyan orders:

- Order of Idris I
- High Order of Sayyid Muhammad ibn Ali al-Senussi
- Order of Independence
- Al-Senussi National Service Star
- Al-Senussi Army Liberation Medal

He was a recipient of the following non-Libyan honours:

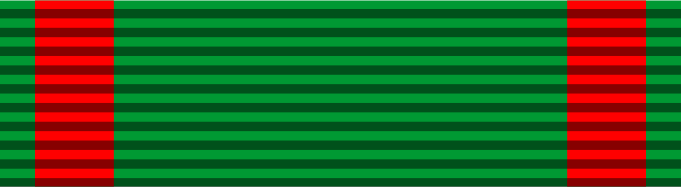
- Imperial Order of the House of Osman 1st class (Ottoman Empire) (1918)
- Nobility (Nishan-i-Majidieh) 2nd class (Ottoman Empire) (1918)
- Collar of the Order of al-Hussein bin Ali (Jordan)
- Honorary Knight Grand Cross of the Order of the British Empire (1954 – KBE in 1946) (United Kingdom)
- Collar of the Order of Muhammad (Morocco)
- Grand Cordon of the Order of the Nile (Egypt)
- Grand Cross of the Legion of Honour (France)
- Grand Cordon of the Order of Independence (Tunisia)
- Grand Cordon of the National Order of the Cedar (Lebanon)
- Grand Cross of the Order of Merit of the Italian Republic (Italy)
- Grand Cross of the Order of the Redeemer (Greece)

Idris of Libya Senussi dynasty Born: 12 March 1889 Died: 25 May 1983
Regnal titles
New title	Emir of Cyrenaica; 1 March 1949 – 24 December 1951	Formation of the Kingdom of Libya
New title Libyan independence	King of Libya; 24 December 1951 – 1 September 1969	Succeeded by Muammar Gaddafi as de facto leader of Libya
Religious titles
Preceded by Ahmed Sharif es Senussi	Chief of the Senussi order 1916 – 4 August 1969	Succeeded by Crown Prince Hasan
Titles in pretence
Loss of title Libyan revolution	— TITULAR — King of Libya; 1–2 September 1969	Succeeded by Crown Prince Hasan
