= Mahmud al-Muntasir =

Prime Minister of Libya (1903–1970)

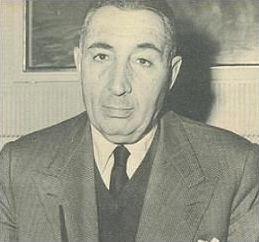

Prime Minister of Libya
- In office 20 January 1964 – 20 March 1965
- Monarch: Idris
- Preceded by: Mohieddin Fikini
- Succeeded by: Hussein Maziq
- In office 29 March 1951 – 19 February 1954; Acting: 29 March 1951 - 24 December 1951
- Monarch: Idris
- Preceded by: Position Established
- Succeeded by: Muhammad Sakizli

Foreign Minister of Libya
- In office 24 December 1951 – 19 February 1954
- Prime Minister: Himself
- Preceded by: Ali Jerbi (Before independence)
- Succeeded by: Muhammad Sakizli

Interior Minister of Libya
- In office 22 January – 26 March 1964
- Prime Minister: Himself
- Preceded by: Wanis al-Qaddafi
- Succeeded by: Muhammad el-Bishti

Personal details
- Born: 8 August 1903 Misrata, Ottoman Tripolitania (now Libya)
- Died: 28 September 1970 (aged 67) Libyan Arab Republic
- Party: Independent

Mahmud al-Muntasir (Italian: [maˈmud]; 8 August 1903 – 28 September 1970) was a Libyan politician and statesman who served as the first Prime minister of Libya from March 29, 1951 to February 19, 1954, and again from January 20, 1964 to March 20, 1965. He was also the Minister of Foreign Affairs during his first term.

== Family background ==
- Mahmud al-Muntasir was a descendant of the al-Muntasir family, an old prominent family from Misrata; his ancestors were from the Kuwafi tribe from Misrata.
- He was the father of Libyan foreign minister Omar Mahmud al-Muntasir, and grandfather of Libyan footballer, Jehad al-Muntasir

== Before independence ==
- During the Italian occupation of Libya, al-Muntasir had presumably won the trust of Italians. After the political change in 1969, many Libyans regarded al-Muntasir as a puppet.
- On 25 November 1950, members of the "National Association" met for the first time with the goal of writing the Libyan Constitution. Al-Muntasir was one of the delegates from Tripolitania. In March 1951, he was assigned to form that province’s government and, by the end of the month, was assigned to form the provisional federal government of Libya.

== Early years of independence ==
- On 24 December 1951, King Idris I of Libya declared its independence, and al-Muntasir became the prime minister of independent Libya.
- One of the first major challenges al-Muntasir met was the situation of foreign military bases in Libya. To strengthen his position at negotiations with Great Britain and the United States, he first asked help from Egypt, then under King Farouk. The terms of the Egyptian government were hardly to be accepted: they offered only one million pounds, and demanded that this aid must be supervised by Egyptians, and demanded also the ceding of the Jaghbub oasis to them. The British, meanwhile, offered 2.75 million sterling pounds in order to retain their bases in Libya and al-Muntasir accepted the British offer.
- One of the most controversial decisions of al-Muntasir was dissolving the political parties in Libya, and expatriating the famous political leader Bashir es Sadawi.
- Al-Muntasir resigned from office on 15 February 1954 and was appointed the Libyan ambassador in London.

== Second Cabinet ==
- In January 1964, King Idris recalled al-Muntasir to form a new cabinet. At that time, troubles were not very far. On 22 February 1964, President Gamal Abdul Nasser of Egypt made a speech in his country saying that:" … [the foreign military] bases existing in Libya …are a danger to the whole Arab nation..". This speech, accompanied with anti-Libyan propaganda in the Egyptian media, agitated the Libyan people, so al-Muntasir decided to commence the negotiations for foreign evacuation with Great Britain and the United States and Hussein Maziq, his foreign minister, was assigned to run the negotiations. Unexpectedly, when Maziq was attending an Arab summit in Cairo the same year, President Nasser told him, after American pressure on Nasser, not to be in a rush to eject the American forces from Libya. This meant suspension of the evacuation's negotiations. Maziq told the story of this meeting while defending himself at the Libyan People's Court in 1970.
- Al-Muntasir resigned in March 1965 for health reasons, then, he was appointed the chief of the royal bureau.

== Death ==
After the coup d'état of 1 September 1969, al-Mutasir was arrested, then died in prison on 28 September 1970, aged 67. There were rumors saying that he committed suicide because of bad treatment, but these rumors were never confirmed.
