= Abdul Hamid al-Bakkoush =

Prime Minister of Libya (1933–2007)

Abdul Hamid Al Bakoush عبد الحميد البكوش
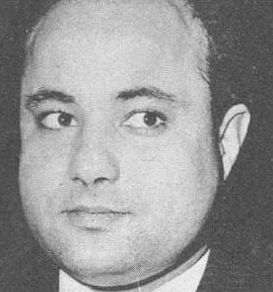

Prime Minister of Libya
- In office 25 October 1967 – 4 September 1968
- Monarch: Idris
- Preceded by: Abdul Qadir al-Badri
- Succeeded by: Wanis al-Qaddafi

Justice Minister of Libya
- In office 22 January 1964 – 4 October 1968
- Prime Minister: Himself
- Preceded by: Omar Mahmud al-Muntasir
- Succeeded by: Rajab al-Majri

Personal details
- Born: 10 August 1933 Tajura, Libya
- Died: 2 May 2007 (aged 73) Abu Dhabi, United Arab Emirates

Abdul Hamid al-Bakkoush (Arabic: عبد الحميد البكوش) (10 August 1933 – 2 May 2007) was Prime Minister of Libya from 25 October 1967 to 4 September 1968. After the proclamation of the Jamahiriya by Gaddafi, he went into exile to Egypt and became one of the leaders of the opposition to the Libyan government. He also held the office of Minister of Justice thrice between January 1964 and September 1968.

== Prime minister ==
In 1968, during his term in office, Libya created, with Saudi Arabia and Kuwait, the Organization of Arab Petroleum Exporting Countries (OAPEC), in order to coordinate production, refining, transport, and commercialization of oil between the three countries. In July of that same year, Libya signed the Nuclear Non-Proliferation Treaty.

After premiership, he became the ambassador of Libya to France.

== Opposition from exile ==
During Gaddafi's presidency he went into exile, first to London and then to Paris. In 1977 he settled in Cairo, Egypt, where in 1982 he created the Libyan Liberation Organization, joining the Libyan National Salvation Front (LNSF), the opposition in exile.

Following the arrival of a suspected Libyan hit squad in Cairo, Egyptian officials faked his assassination on November 12, 1984, publishing staged photos in the press to get Libya to announce the assassination a success. Libya took the bait, and relations between Egypt and Libya, which were already poor, deteriorated even further.

== See also ==
- History of modern Libya
