= Abdul Qadir al-Badri =

Former Prime Minister of Libya

Abdul Al-Qadir El-Badri عبد القادر البدري
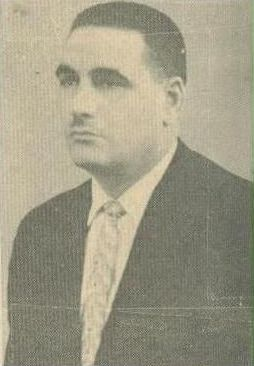

Prime Minister of Libya
- In office 2 July 1967 – 25 October 1967
- Monarch: Idris
- Preceded by: Hussein Maziq
- Succeeded by: Abdul Hamid al-Bakkoush

Housing Minister of Libya
- In office 2 October 1965 – 1 July 1967
- Prime Minister: Hussein Maziq
- Preceded by: none
- Succeeded by: Wanis al-Qaddafi (acting)

Personal details
- Born: 8 December 1921
- Died: 13 February 2003 (aged 81)

Abdul al-Qadir El-Badri (Arabic: عبد القادر البدري) (8 December 1921 – 13 February 2003) was a Libyan politician. He served as Prime Minister from 2 July to 25 October 1967. He was born near Abyar.

== Early life ==
Badri was born in the Alumblytanih region near Biar. He was an only child in a poor family who belonged to the "Awageer" Mujahid tribe, one of the country's largest tribes. His primary education took place in religious schools. He turned to agriculture and commerce early in life. He married four women and had many children, including 15 daughters..

== Career ==
He was elected to the House of Representatives of the Barqa government in 1950. He was repeatedly elected as a member of the "Abyar" circle in all parliamentary elections following independence. He won the House of Representatives elections for the Abyear District from December 1952 to December 1960. He became the minister of agriculture of Abdul Majeed Ka'bar's government in his last days (September–October 1960). He served as Minister of Economy and Health and Fisheries in the Government of Mohamed Osman (October 1960 to October 1961), and Minister of Industry in the government of Hussein Mazzek (March to October 1965). He became the minister of housing and government property in the same government (October 1965 to April 1967).
