= Muhammad Osman Said =

Libyan politician

Mohamed Othman Essed محمد عثمان الصيد
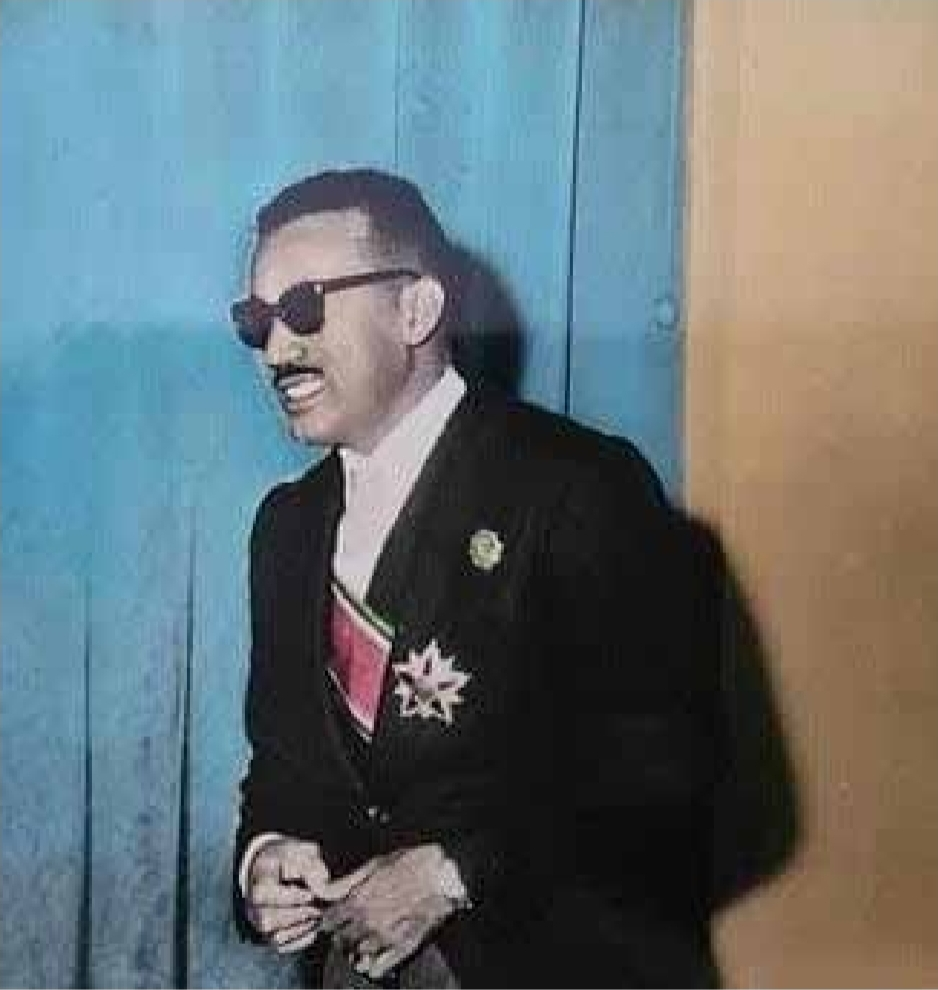

Prime Minister of Libya
- In office 17 October 1960 – 19 March 1963
- Monarch: Idris I
- Preceded by: Abdul Majid Kubar
- Succeeded by: Mohieddin Fikini

Personal details
- Born: 17 October 1924 Libya
- Died: 31 December 2007 (aged 83)

Muhammad Osman Essed (or Assed) (17 October 1924 – 31 December 2007) was a Libyan politician who held many positions in the era of the Kingdom of Libya including the Prime Minister of Libya from 17 October 1960 to 19 March 1963.

== Early life and education ==
Essed was born on 17 October 1924 in the village of al-Zawiyah near Brak, in the Fezzan region. His father, Ahmad al-Badawi Essed, served as a religious judge and tribal mediator during a time when the region lacked formal state institutions. From a young age, Muhammad was immersed in Qur’anic education, memorizing the entire Qur’an by the age of thirteen. He studied classical Islamic sciences including jurisprudence, theology, logic, and Arabic grammar under the guidance of prominent local scholars, notably Sheikh Abd al-Rahman al-Barkuli and Sidi al-Mukhtar al-Zawi.

== Anti-colonial activity, detention, and independence (1940s–1951) ==
In the mid-1940s, while Fezzan was under French military occupation, he co-founded a secret nationalist group in Brak alongside Sheikh Abd al-Rahman al-Barkuli. The group's objective was to oppose the political separation of Fezzan from the rest of Libya and promote national unity through grassroots education and discreet mobilization of the population.

In January 1946, Essed and al-Barkuli covertly traveled to Tripoli to meet with prominent nationalist leaders, including Ahmad al-Fuqih al-Hasan and Mustafa Mizran. The trip aimed to coordinate Fezzan's movement with broader nationalist efforts in Tripolitania. Upon their return, they expanded their activities quietly to avoid confrontation with the French authorities.

In April 1948, during the visit of the United Nations Four-Power Commission, Essed helped organize a public assembly in Zawiyat al-Shaikh near Brak. There, he and other activists publicly expressed support for Libyan independence and territorial unity. The gathering drew immediate attention from French authorities, who summoned Essed for questioning.

Soon afterward, Essed was arrested by French colonial forces and detained at the Brak military facility. According to both his memoir and independent Libyan academic sources, he was subjected to repeated interrogations and held under strict surveillance. His detention was part of a broader French crackdown in which over 150 suspected nationalists were reportedly executed without trial.

Local reports and family accounts claim that Essed's agricultural property, including palm estates, was confiscated during this period as a form of economic reprisal.

In early 1950, under mounting pressure from tribal leaders and following intervention by United Nations High Commissioner Adrian Pelt, Essed was conditionally released. He was briefly allowed to meet with Pelt under armed escort and was later released without formal charges, though he remained under daily reporting requirements to the French military command in Brak.

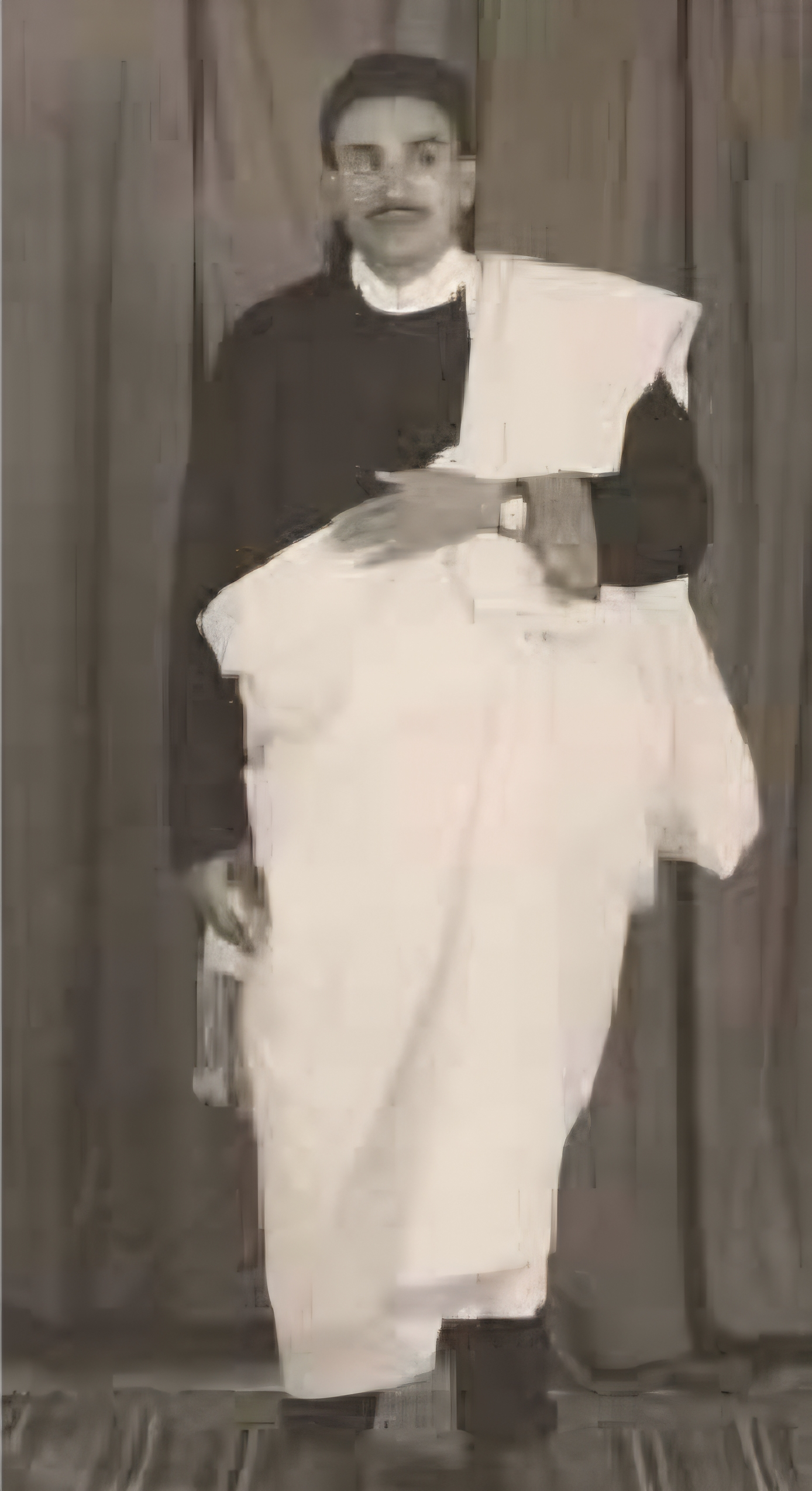
Young Muhammad Osman Essed 1951

Following his release in early 1950, Mohamed Othman Essed became an active participant in Libya's transition to independence. He was appointed to the "Committee of Twenty-One" and later served as a representative for Fezzan in the regional advisory council. He was then selected as the Fezzan delegate on the Constituent Assembly (Committee of Sixty) that drafted Libya's independence constitution in 1951 advocating for Fezzanhaving equal autonomy. At just 26 years old, he was among the youngest members and read out the oath of allegiance to King Idris I on behalf of the assembly.

== Minister of Health and Early Government Career (1951–1957) ==
Following Libya's independence on 24 December 1951, Mohamed Othman Essed was appointed as Minister without portfolio in Mahmud al‑Muntasir's transitional government. He was promptly elevated to Minister of Health, holding the position through multiple cabinets until 1957.

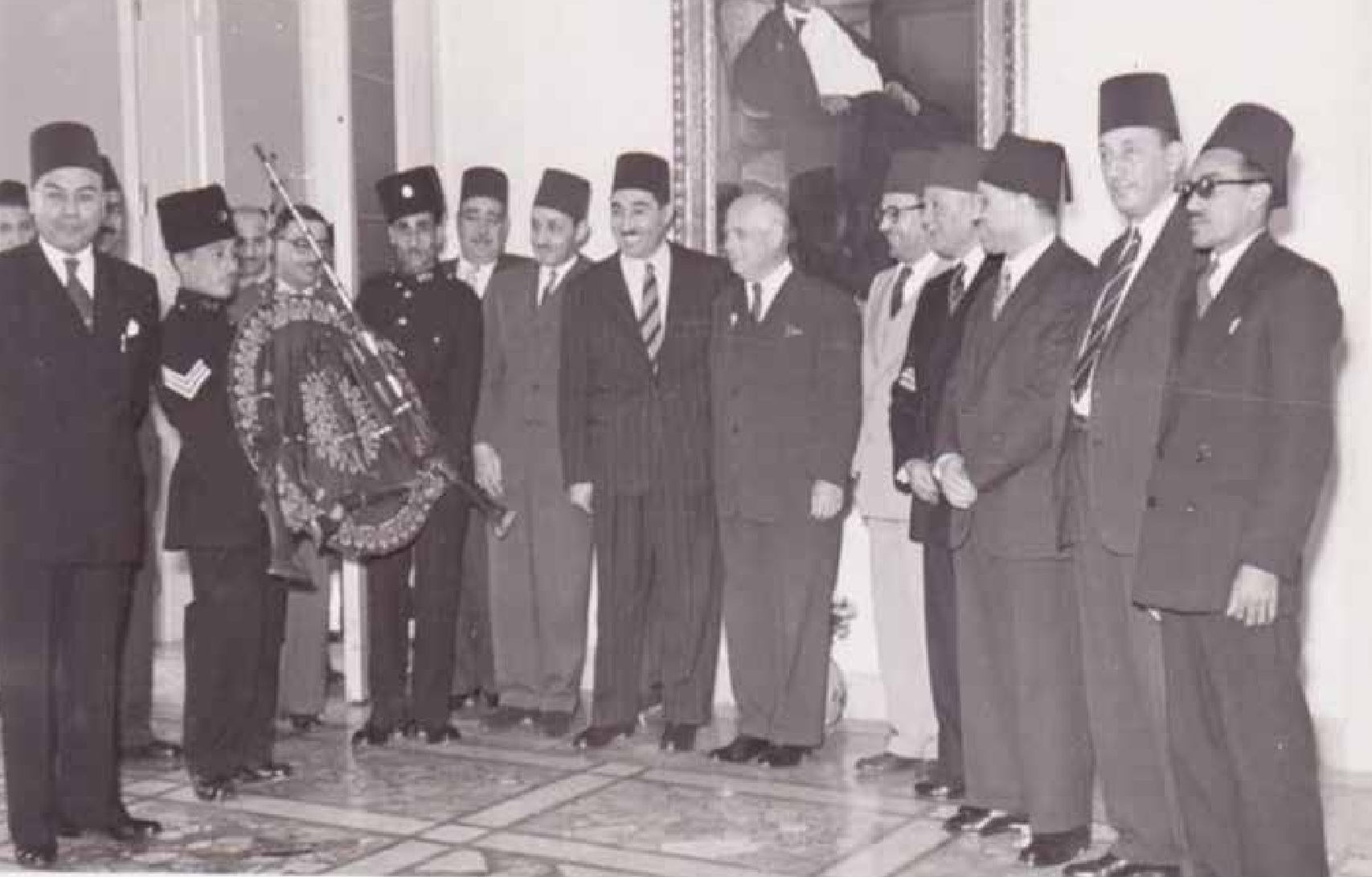
Muhammad Osman Essed to the left as health minister, 1956

=== Major Achievements ===
Essed played a foundational role in establishing Libya's public health framework:

- He initiated the construction of rural clinics and introduced mobile medical units that significantly increased healthcare access in remote regions like Fezzan.
- Organized nationwide vaccination campaigns and set up tuberculosis control clinics, which were instrumental in reducing mortality in underserved areas.
- Advanced collaboration with international organizations, including WHO and UNICEF, to improve healthcare delivery and professional capacity.
- Facilitated the formation of a public health administration vertical, linking central ministries with regional health authorities to standardize medical services nationwide.

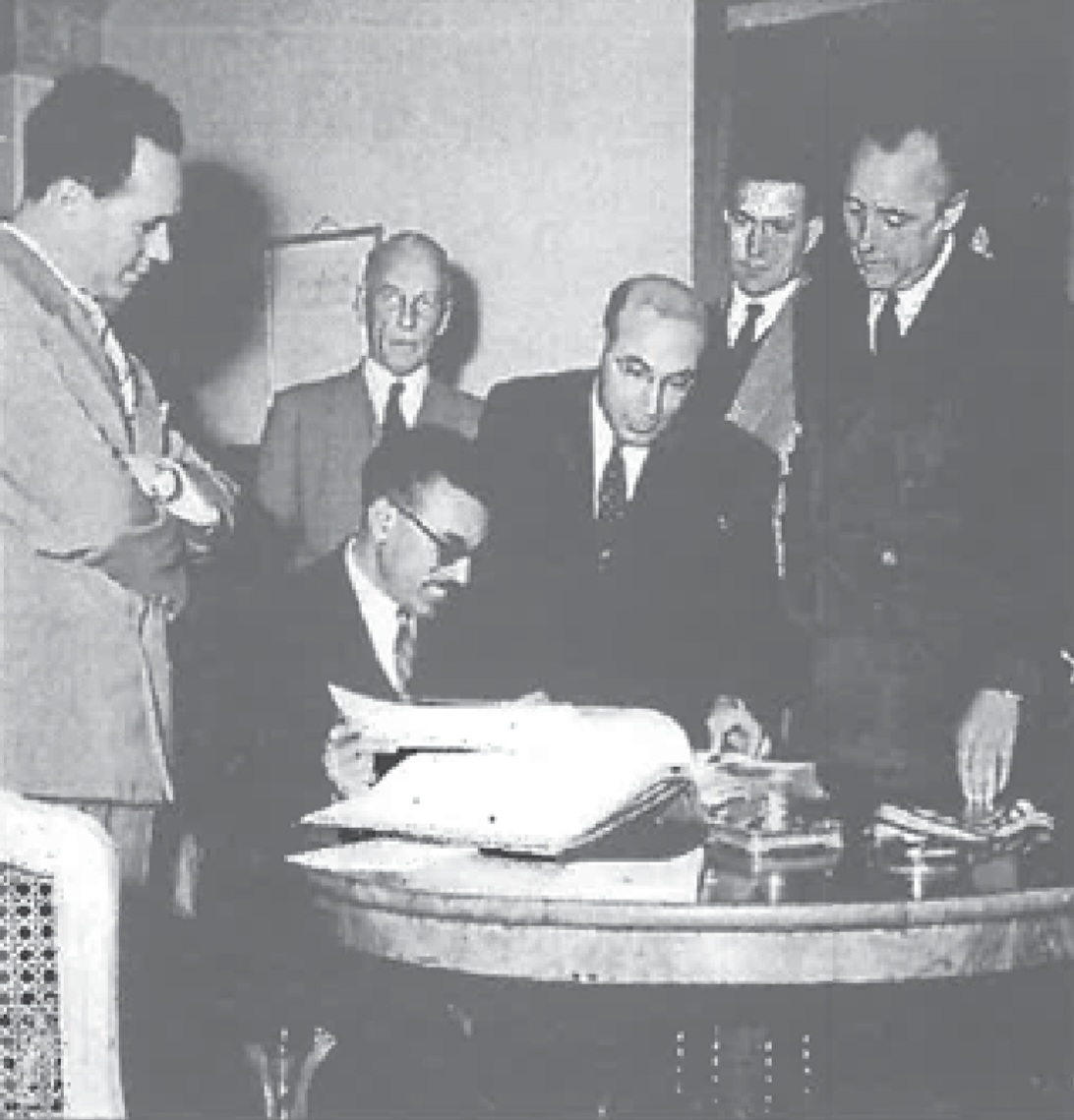
Signing with red Cross and red crescent

== Minister of Economy and Finance (1957–1960) ==
In 1957, Mohamed Othman Essed was appointed Minister of Economy and Finance under Prime Minister Abdel Majid Kubar. His appointment came at a critical moment, as Libya began transitioning from a federal structure toward greater economic centralization and state-led planning.

As minister, Essed focused on consolidating Libya's fragmented financial systems, which had previously been managed separately under the three-region federal system. He worked to establish a national budget framework, streamline public expenditures, and lay the groundwork for centralized fiscal governance.

Although oil exports had not yet begun, his ministry played a key role in preparing Libya's economic institutions for the coming oil economy. This included:

- Creating administrative mechanisms for national revenue pooling, anticipating the need for equitable distribution across regions.
- Reinforcing oversight over foreign aid, trade contracts, and public sector investment, especially in infrastructure and health.

Essed's tenure is generally viewed as a technocratic success, credited with enabling Libya to smoothly transition from a donor-dependent economy to one ready to absorb and manage oil wealth. His experience in both health and finance portfolios established his reputation as a competent administrator—leading to his appointment as Prime Minister in October 1960.

== Personal life and death ==
Essed married Lola Seif, who remained his partner throughout much of his political and later exile years. He had nine children, three of them, Saud, Khaled, and Abdussalam were assassinated in the early 1990s while the family lived in exile due to their outspoken opposition to Libya's regime. Essed's wife died in October 2002, deeply affecting him in the final years of his life.

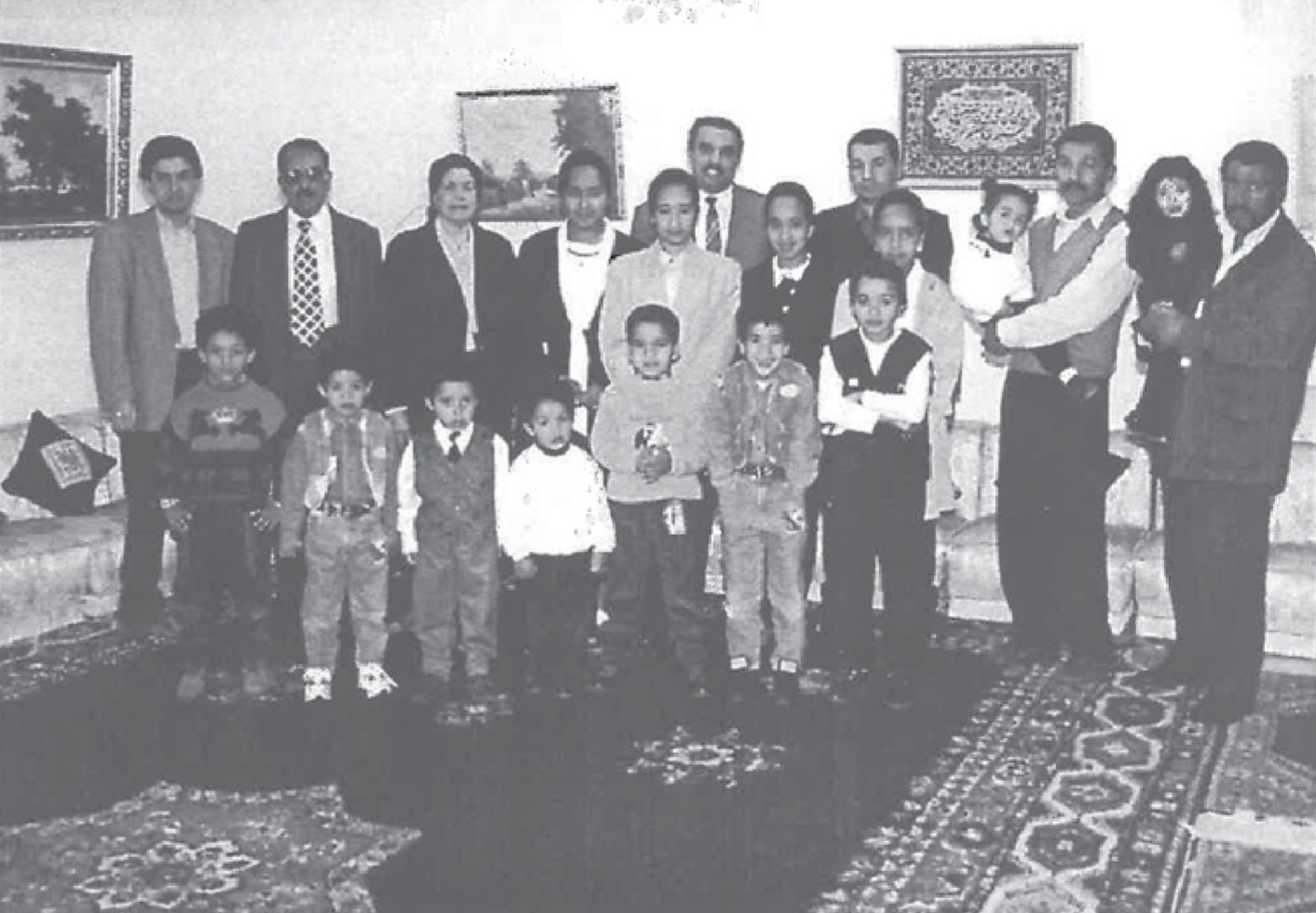
With four of his sons and grandkids

After the 1969 coup in Libya, Essed lived in exile in Morocco until his death on 31 December 2007 continuing to advocate for democratic reforms and Libyan self-determination. He declined invitations to return to Libya, stating he would only do so if free and fair elections were held.

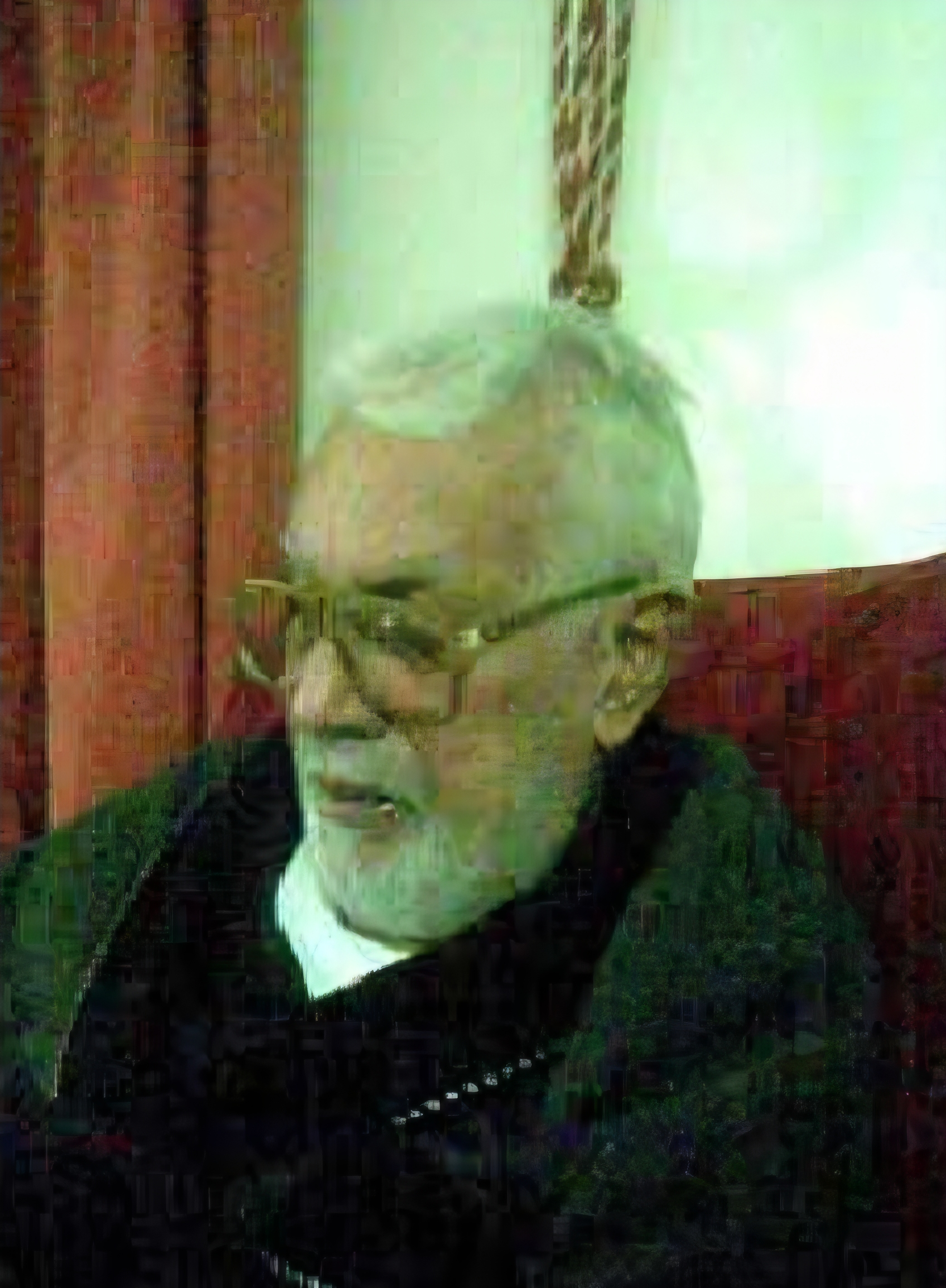
Mohamed Osman Essed in his house in Morocco
