= List of companies of Libya =

Location of Libya

Libya is a country in the Maghreb region of North Africa, bordered by the Mediterranean Sea to the north, Egypt to the east, Sudan to the southeast, Chad and Niger to the south, and Algeria and Tunisia to the west. The Libyan economy depends primarily upon revenues from the oil sector, which accounts for 80% of GDP and 97% of exports. Libya holds the largest proven oil reserves in Africa and is an important contributor to the global supply of light, sweet crude. Apart from petroleum, the other natural resources are natural gas and gypsum.

== Notable firms ==
This list includes notable companies with primary headquarters located in the country. The industry and sector follow the Industry Classification Benchmark taxonomy. Organizations which have ceased operations are included and noted as defunct.

Notable companies Status: P=Private, S=State; A=Active, D=Defunct
Name	Industry	Sector	Headquarters	Founded	Notes	Status	
Afriqiyah Airways	Consumer services	Airlines	Tripoli	2001	State airline	S	A
Agricultural Bank of Libya	Financials	Banks	Tripoli	1957	Development bank	P	A
Air Libya	Consumer services	Airlines	Benghazi	1996	Charter airline	P	A
Air One Nine	Consumer services	Airlines	Tripoli	2004	Airline	P	A
Alajnihah Airways	Consumer services	Airlines	Tripoli	2006	Airline, defunct 2011	P	D
Arabian Cement Co.	Industrials	Building materials & fixtures	Al Khums	1988	Cement	P	A
Arabian Gulf Oil Company	Oil & gas	Exploration & production	Benghazi	1979	Exploration, production	P	A
Banque Sahélo-Saharienne pour l'Investissement et le Commerce	Financials	Banks	Tripoli	1999	Investment bank	P	A
Brega Marketing Company	Oil & gas	Exploration & production	Tripoli	1974	Part of National Oil Corporation	S	A
Buraq Air	Consumer services	Airlines	Benghazi	2001	Airline	P	A
Central Bank of Libya	Financials	Banks	Tripoli	1956	Central bank	S	A
General National Maritime Transport Company	Industrials	Marine transportation	Tripoli	1975	Transportation	S	A
General Posts and Telecommunications Company	Telecommunications	Fixed line telecommunications	Tripoli	1984	Telecom and post	S	A
Ghadames Air Transport	Consumer services	Airlines	Tripoli	2004	Airline, defunct 2006	P	D
Libya Telecom & Technology	Telecommunications	Fixed line telecommunications	Tripoli	1997	Telecom	S	A
Libyan Airlines	Consumer services	Airlines	Tripoli	1964	State airline	S	A
Libyan Arab Air Cargo	Industrials	Delivery services	Tripoli	1979	Cargo airline	P	A
Libyan Cement Company	Industrials	Building materials & fixtures	Benghazi	1972	Cement	P	A
Libyan Foreign Bank	Financials	Banks	Tripoli	1972	Part of Central Bank of Libya	S	A
Libyan Iron and Steel Company	Basic materials	Iron & steel	Misurata	1979	Steelmaker	S	A
Libyan Jamahiriya Broadcasting Corporation	Consumer services	Broadcasting & entertainment	Tripoli	1969	Defunct broadcaster (before the revolution)	P	D
Libyana	Telecommunications	Mobile telecommunications	Tripoli	2004	Mobile phones	S	A
National Oil Corporation	Oil & gas	Exploration & production	Tripoli	1970	State oil holding	S	A
Oilibya	Oil & gas	Exploration & production	Tripoli	2008	Oil and retail	P	A
Qabas	Industrials	Professional business support services	Tripoli	1994	Consulting firm	P	A
Sahara Bank	Financials	Banks	Tripoli	1964	Bank	S	A
Sirte Oil Company	Oil & gas	Exploration & production	Brega	1981	Part of National Oil Corporation	S	A
Umma Bank	Financials	Banks	Tripoli	1907	Bank	S	A
Waha Oil Company	Oil & gas	Exploration & production	Tripoli	1956	Part of National Oil Corporation	S	A
Zawia Oil Refining Company	Oil & gas	Exploration & production	Tripoli	1976	Part of National Oil Corporation	P	A

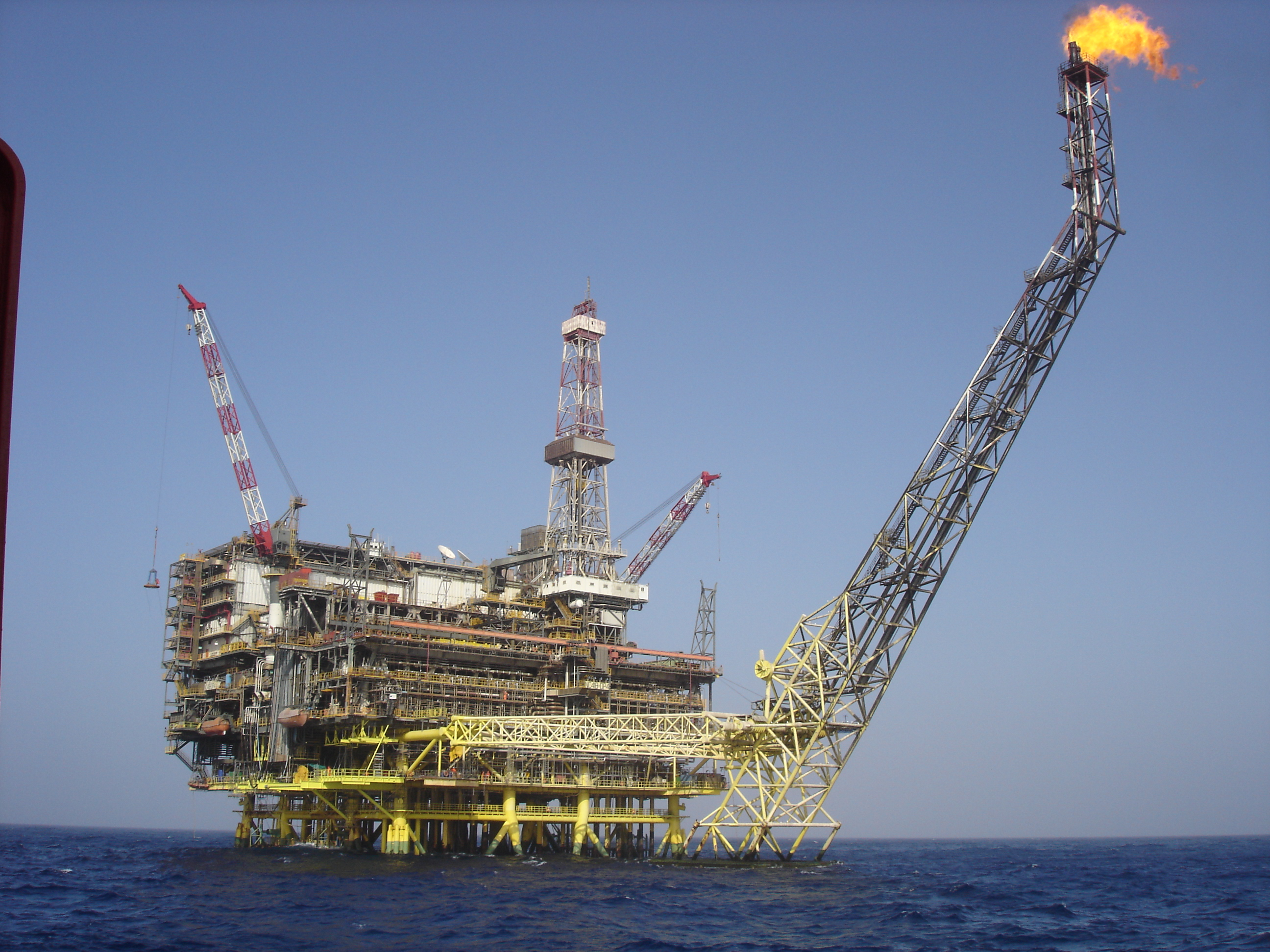
The ENI Oil Bouri DP4 in the Bouri Field

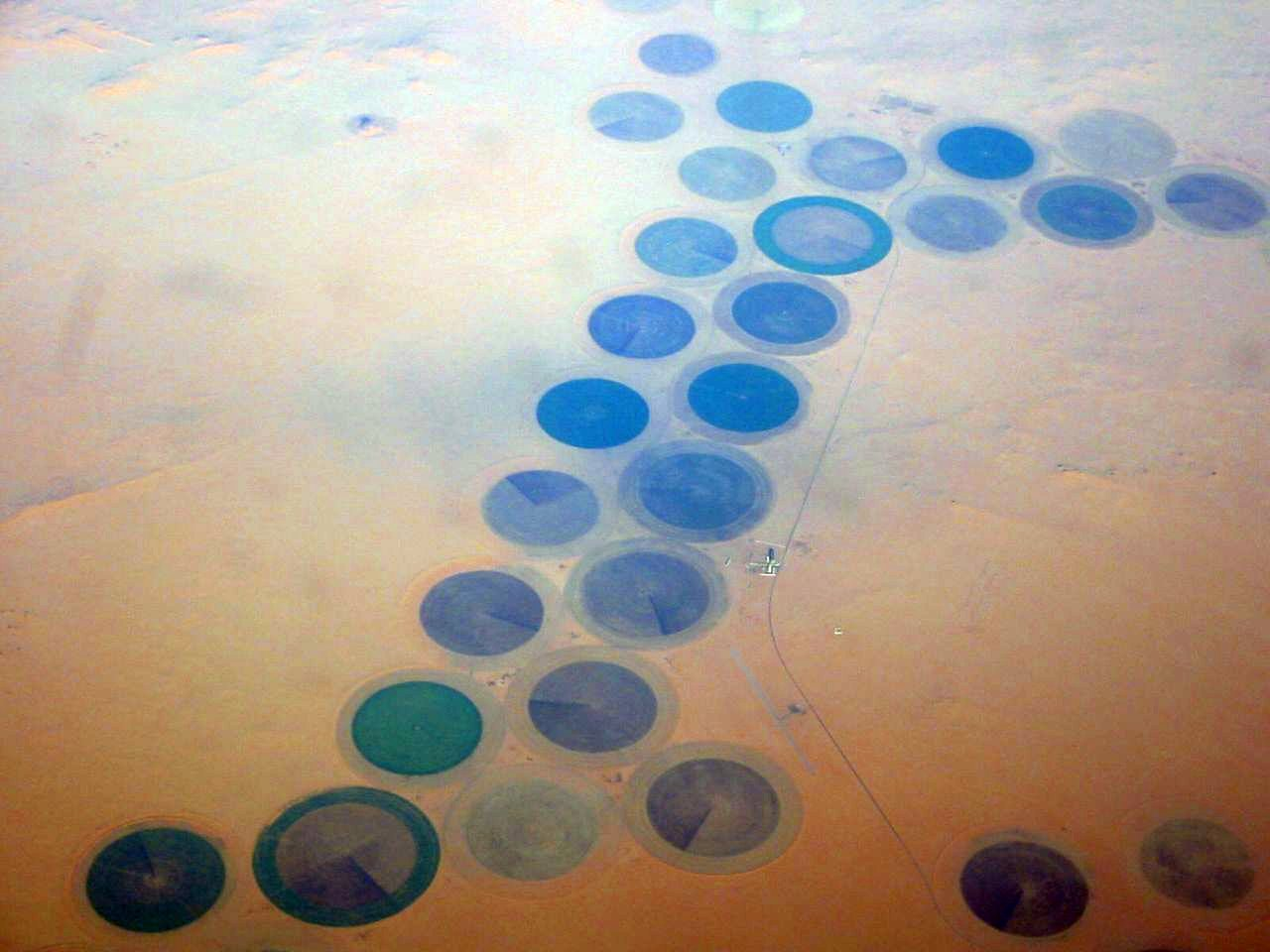
Pivot irrigation in Kufra.

== See also ==
- List of airlines of Libya
- List of banks in Libya
