= Muhammad al-Huwayj =

Libyan politician

Muhammad Ali Al-Huwayj (Arabic: محمد علي الحويج) is a Libyan politician who served as Secretary of Finance of the General People's Committee of Libya from 2004 to 2006 and from 2007 to 2009. He replaced former GPCO Secretary of Finance, Dr. Ahmed Munaysi Abd-al-Hamid.

== Activities ==
Since sanctions against Libya were eased in April 2004, Al-Huwayj has attempted to attract foreign investors and accelerate a domestic privatization campaign. For example, in 2005 Al-Huwayj argued, "with a GDP of USD $21 billion and a relatively small population of 5.8 million people, Libya is a wealthy country. Libya has no financial problems, almost no foreign debt and is the most stable country in the region."

== Other activities ==
Before becoming a minister, Al-Huwayj was head of the Libyan Arab Foreign Investment Company (LAFICO). Al-Huwayj is also on the board of directors for the Libyan Investment Corporation (LIC), which was established in 2007 as a holding company with a mandate to manage state enterprises, such as the Fund for Africa and the Economic and Social Development Fund. Abdul-Hafiz Zlitni is deputy chairman for (LIC). Other board member include Planning Secretary Taher al-Juhaymi and Farhat Bengdara, who is governor for the Central Bank of Libya. LIC's President and Chief Executive Officer is Muhammad Layas who previously chaired the Libyan Arab Foreign Bank (LAFB).
