= Abd-al-Hafid Mahmud al-Zulaytini =

Libyan politician (1938–2021)

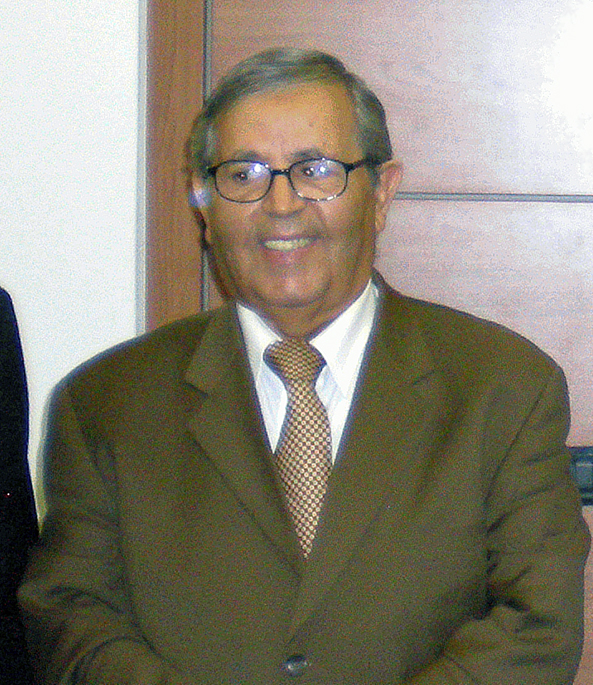
- Zulaytini in 2010

Governor of the Central Bank of Libya
- In office 7 October 1990 – 13 February 1996
- Preceded by: Muhammad az-Zaruq Rajab
- Succeeded by: Taher Al-Jehaimi
- In office 6 March – 2 April 2011 (acting)
- Preceded by: Farhat Bengdara
- Succeeded by: Muhammad az-Zaruq Rajab

Personal details
- Born: 1938 Tripoli, Italian Libya
- Died: 12 November 2021 (aged 82)

Dr. Abd-al-Hafid Mahmud al-Zulaytini (Arabic: عبد الحفيظ محمود الزليطني; 1938 – 12 November 2021) was a Libyan politician who served as Assistant Secretary of the General People's Committee of Libya (Deputy Prime Minister) prior to the Libyan Civil War.

== Background ==
In late 2001, Zulaytini took over from Ahmad Abdel Karim Ahmad as acting chairman of the governing council for state-owned National Oil Company (NOC), becoming the top man in the petroleum sector in Libya. Ahmad had been chairman since 1 October 2000 and was relatively a new figure promoted by someone close to Gaddafi. He had taken over from Abdallah Salem el-Badri. Zulaytini was appointed NOC chairman in January 2002, with specific directions to work on attracting foreign investment into Libya.

On 23 February 2007, the Libyan General People's Congress passed a resolution appointing a new cabinet led by Baghdadi Mahmudi, the current prime minister and a new deputy, al-Zulaytini.

== Other activities ==
Al-Zulaytini was also deputy chairman for the Libyan Investment Corporation (LIC), which was established in early 2007 as a holding company with a mandate to manage and restructure state enterprises, such as the Fund for Africa and the Economic and Social Development Fund. Board members include Planning Secretary Taher Al-Jehaimi, Secretary of Finance Muhammad al-Huwayj, and Farhat Bengdara, who is governor of the Central Bank of Libya. LIC's President and CEO is Muhammad Layas who previously chaired the Libyan Arab Foreign Bank (LAFB). He was Secretary of Finance from 2009 to 2011.

Zulaytini was also the chairman of Al Masraf, a commercial bank in the United Arab Emirates.

== See also ==
- General People's Committee of Libya
