= Jumhouria Bank =

- Native name: مصرف الجمهورية
- Type: Public
- Industry: Banking
- Founded: 1907; 119 years ago
- Key people: Nouri Ali Abu Fulaija (General Manager), Dr. Ali Abu Salah Amreigha
- Number of employees: 5,001 - 10,000
- Website: www.jbank.ly

Jumhouria Bank (Arabic: مصرف الجمهورية) is a Libyan commercial bank partially owned by the state, and is considered one of the largest banks in Libya in terms of the number of branches, customers, and volume of assets. Headquartered in the capital, Tripoli, the bank offers diverse banking services for individuals and corporations, including current accounts, financing, and electronic services through its various applications.

== History ==
The bank was initially established under the name Umma Bank and operated independently until 2007, when the Central Bank of Libya issued a decree merging Umma Bank and Jumhouria Bank into a single entity under the name Jumhouria Bank. Following the merger, the new bank's combined assets reached approximately 8 billion Libyan dinars, making it at the time the second-largest Libyan bank after the Libyan Foreign Bank. Its unified network employed more than 5,800 staff members across 146 branches distributed nationwide. Based on asset volume, it is also ranked among the top ten banks in North Africa.

Later, the bank witnessed significant infrastructure expansion, increasing its branch network to over 170 branches while surpassing 1.5 million customers, establishing it as a leading bank in the country with an estimated market share of 33%.

== Temporary Closure in 2014 ==
On December 7, 2014, Jumhouria Bank was forced to close its doors in the Old City of Tripoli due to escalating kidnapping incidents and security threats targeting its employees. This decision came as a result of a lack of adequate security arrangements and protection, leading to a complete halt of the bank's operations in the capital. According to media sources, the bank's general manager at the time, Ahmed Rajab, left the country after receiving direct threats from Khaled al-Sharif, Deputy Minister of Defense and a former member of the Libyan Islamic Fighting Group, against the backdrop of his refusal to transfer 80 million Libyan dinars from the Ministry of Defense account to private accounts.

== Digital Transformation and Electronic Services ==
Jumhouria Bank has witnessed remarkable development in digital services to keep pace with the technological transformation in the Libyan banking sector. The bank has launched several applications, such as "Masrafy Plus" for balance inquiries, transfers, and bill payments via mobile phone, "Masrafy Pay" for electronic payment services, and "Masrafy Business" tailored for institutions to manage their accounts and execute financial transactions electronically.
