= AbdulMagid Breish =

Libyan banker

- Born: 11 October 1951 (age 75); Libya
- Education: American University of Beirut

AbdulMagid AbdulSalam Breish (born October 11, 1951) is a prominent Libyan international investment banker.

== Education ==
Breish holds a Bachelor of Arts in Political Sciences from the American University of Beirut, graduating in 1975. In 1977 he gained a Diploma in Financial Analysis and Policy Diploma, from the International Monetary Fund in Washington DC.

Breish speaks fluent Arabic, English and Italian.

== Career ==
Breish has over 40 years of experience working in the banking and finance sector.

Breish started his career in banking in 1975 when he joined the Libyan Arab Foreign Bank in Tripoli, Libya. In 1980 he moved to the Bank ABC and served as Head of Business Development until 1985 before transferring to Tokyo as Chief Representative.

In 1988 Breish took over as managing director of ABC Investment & Services Co. (E.C.) the ABC Group's Investment Bank in Bahrain. In 1991 he assumed the position of General Manager of Bank ABC, and was appointed that bank's Chief Executive Officer in 1993. In November 2002, Breish assumed the position of Deputy Chief Executive and Chief Banking Officer of the ABC Group.

Breish held the following directorships during his banking career: Chairman of ABC Islamic Bank in Bahrain; Chairman of ABC Securities; Chairman of the Bahrain Stock Exchange Audit Committee, and board member of the Bahrain Stock Exchange; chairman at ABC Daus Germany; Director at Banque Internationale de Monaco; Director at Sun Hung Kai Bank in Hong Kong; Director at United Bank of Bangkok Thailand; and held the Chairmanship of the Foreign Banks and Securities Houses Association (FBSA) in London.

== Libyan Investment Authority ==
Breish was appointed Chairman of the Libyan Investment Authority (LIA) on 1 June 2013 by the LIA's board of trustees. On 17 June 2013, he was appointed CEO by the LIA's board of directors.

=== Dispute over leadership ===
Breish faced a leadership challenge by the now resigned Chairman of the LIA Hassan Bouhadi and judge ruled in favor of the GNA as being the legitimate government.

In June 2014, Breish was removed as chairman by the integrity committee, which sought to replace former Gaddafi aids. The LIA's Board of Trustees appointed Mr. AbdulRahman Benyezza. Breish was then reinstated on 18 May, following a decision of the Libyan Court Of Appeal on 13 April 2015.

== Initiating LIA's litigations against Goldman Sachs and Société Générale S.A ==
In early 2014, Breish initiated legal proceedings on behalf of the LIA against Goldman Sachs and Société Générale S.A to recover billions of dollars lost through improper transactions done in their dealings with the LIA during the Gaddafi regime. The LIA appointed the English law firm Enyo Law to pursue the litigations. The Enyo Law Firm was forced to step aside in April 2015 but was re-instated in July 2015 when the English High Court approved the LIA's application to appoint BDO LLP (UK) as interim receivers and Enyo Law were reappointed as solicitors in the litigations.

== Calls for LIA assets to stay frozen ==
Breish has consistently called for the UN to maintain its freeze over the majority of the LIA's assets. Under UN Security Council Resolution 1970 of 26 February 2011 approximately 85% of the LIA's assets remain frozen to safeguard them against potential misappropriation and corruption. These sanctions were originally requested by the National Transitional Council shortly after the fall of the Gaddafi regime to protect such assets from theft.

Breish has insisted on maintaining the UN position that Libyan assets must be frozen until a Unity Government emerges and asserts control. Bouhadi, by contrast, has repeatedly sought to unfreeze the assets, stating that said he would appeal to the UN, the US and the EU.

== Breish's support for Presidency Council and Government of National Accord ==
Breish had supported the establishment of a Presidency Council (PC) and Government of National Accord (GNA) since 3 April 2016. In a statement Breish welcomed the PC and the GNA, stating that "the LIA... reaffirms its readiness fully cooperate with the Government of National Accord in providing all relevant data, report and support" but then changed position when on 16 August 2016 the Presidency Council of the internationally backed Government of National Accord did not include Breish in the newly appointed steering committee to run the LIA. Breish in a later interview claimed that he has contested the appointment and that the decision is illegal
