= Corruption in Libya =

Corruption in Libya is considered a serious problem. In 2024, Transparency International ranked Libya 173rd out of 180 countries in its Corruption Perceptions Index, highlighting its significant corruption challenges. With a score of 13 out of 100, Libya's high level of perceived corruption has severely undermined public trust and exacerbated the country's instability. As a nation heavily reliant on oil revenue, Libya faces additional complexities, grappling with corruption linked to the mismanagement of its crucial financial resources.

== Corruption cases ==
Corruption in Libya reaches the highest echelons of power, as detailed in a series of reports titled "Libya’s Kleptocratic Boom", published by The Sentry. These reports uncovered extensive corruption and criminal activities facilitated by the Libyan political leadership, including human trafficking, fuel smuggling, narcotics, money laundering, and the theft of public funds. The extent of impunity is starkly highlighted in the widespread bribery involving public officials. For instance, when SNC-Lavalin was charged with bribing Libyan officials in 2015, it was revealed that the company has been engaging in this practice from 2001 to 2011. It has made payments amounting to nearly $48 million to Libyan public officials in exchange for construction contracts.

One of the most recent scandals, which was reported in 2024, implicated the Libyan health department. The Libyan Attorney General ordered the arrest of Medical Supply Authority’s financial officer for misappropriating about $307 million. The diverted fund was part of the budget allocated for the management of the financial aspects related to public and limited tenders and contracts for various medical supplies.

=== Corruption in the National Oil Corporation ===
Of particular importance is the corruption and neglect perpetuated on essential institutions such as the National Oil Corporation (NOC). This state-owned company, which is responsible for a significant chunk of Libyan revenue, has been plagued by mismanagement and corruption. Political corruption, for example, severely hampers the organization’s profitability. As property of the state, there are appointments, promotions, and management decisions that are made for purely political reasons. Pressure from the government to redirect funds also contributes to the reduction of efficiency and profitability.

Administrative corruption also hounds NOC. In 2019, the Libyan Audit Bureaus accused NOC Chairman Mustafa Sanalla of corruption and practices that lack transparency due to the absence of financial disclosures. The practices led to legal irregularities, loss of investment opportunities, and the defection of the company’s board of directors. Sanalla was also involved in previous corruption scandals such as the case of delayed delivery of armored vehicle from an American company.

== Impact ==
After Muammar Gaddafi came to power in 1969, the Libyan government centralized its institutions in Tripoli including the National Oil Corporation (NOC). This development, which persists today, highlights the impact of corruption in Libya because the concentration of power created an imbalance in terms of the allocation of resources and revenues, leading to the neglect of other regions, including oil-producing areas. As decisions that distribute wealth favor the elites and the central government, oil wealth is being spent without equitable benefit to the marginalized regions. The severity of corruption and the mismanagement of the government have led to the critical deterioration of infrastructure and public services, aggravating the ongoing humanitarian crisis in Libya. Public officials have confirmed this. According to Attorney General Al-Siddiq Al-Sour, for instance, widespread corruption has created a huge gap in the distribution of income among the Libyan people.

Facing international pressure, there are attempts on the part of the Libyan government to address corruption such as the passage of anti-corruption and anti-money laundering laws. Mechanisms of oversight for institutions and for inter-agency collaboration to combat crimes have also been established. However, the lack of enforcement of these legal frameworks remains a challenge. In addition, the culture of impunity further exacerbates the problem. Since the 2011 revolution, the government has struggled with a lack of effective judicial and law enforcement authorities, which allow those that engage in corruption and other related crimes to act without fear of accountability.

Libya is also engaged in an ongoing conflict as armed groups and militias continue to proliferate. These often commit crimes and some get to control state resources. These groups’ presence has contributed to the volatile environment and the weakening of Libya’s institutions, hampering the state’s capability to combat corruption. This is, for instance, demonstrated in Libya’s partnership with the United Nations Office on Drugs and Crime (UNODC), which aims to prevent and combat corruption. The initiative has encountered significant roadblocks due to the risk posed by these armed groups.

== International rankings ==
In Transparency International's 2025 Corruption Perceptions Index, Libya scored 13 on a scale from 0 ("highly corrupt") to 100 ("very clean"). When ranked by score, Libya ranked 177th among the 182 countries in the Index, where the country ranked first is perceived to have the most honest public sector. For comparison with regional scores, the best score among Middle Eastern and North African countries (Note: Algeria, Bahrain, Egypt, Iran, Iraq, Israel, Jordan, Kuwait, Lebanon, Libya, Morocco, Oman, Qatar, Saudi Arabia, Syria, Tunisia, United Arab Emirates, and Yemen) was 69, the average was 39 and the worst was 13. For comparison with worldwide scores, the best score was 89 (ranked 1), the average was 42, and the worst was 9 (ranked 181 in a two-way tie).
