= Mustafa Sanalla =

Libyan businessman

Mustafa Sanalla (مصطفى صنع الله) served as the chairman of the National Oil Corporation (NOC), Libya's national oil company, between May 2014 and July 2022. After acquiring a degree in chemical engineering from the University of Tripoli in 1985 Sanalla joined Ras Lanuf Oil and Gas Processing Company, a subsidiary of the NOC which operates a refinery in Ras Lanuf, Libya. Sanalla was subsequently promoted several times until he was appointed as the NOC chairman in 2014.

As chairman, Sanalla sought to maintain the independence of the NOC and increase Libya's oil production, which has been repeatedly disrupted since the outbreak of the 2011 civil war. Sanalla also engaged in efforts to attract international investment to Libya's oil and gas sector.

On 13 July 2022, Sanalla was replaced by Farhat Bengdara as the head of the NOC.
