= Rida al-Tubuly =

Libyan pharmacologist and activist

- رضا الطبولي
- Born: 1967 (age 58–59); Tripoli, Libya
- Education: Imperial College London; University of Essex; University of Warsaw
- Occupation: Pharmacologist
- Known for: Gender equality
- Awards: 100 Women (2019)
- Scientific career
- Thesis: catalogue.libraries.london.ac.uk/record=b1775877 (1997)

Rida Ahmed al-Tubuly (Arabic: رضا الطبولي Riḍā aṭ-Ṭubūlī; born 1967, also Reda, Al-Tubuly, Al Tubuly, al-Tabuly) is a Libyan pharmacologist and activist. She teaches at the University of Tripoli as a professor of pharmacology. She is an activist for equality and has campaigned to implement United Nations Security Council Resolution 1325. She was selected as one of the BBC 100 Women in 2019.

== Early life and education ==
Al-Tubuly first encountered gender discrimination at the age of five, when she wasn't allowed to accompany her brothers playing outside. Al-Tubuly studied at the University of Warsaw, and graduated with a Master's degree in 1987. She moved to the United Kingdom for her graduate studies, earning a doctoral degree in pharmacology at Imperial College London in 1997. She has also earned a Master of Laws in international human rights law the University of Essex.

== Research ==
As well as being a professor of pharmacology at the University of Tripoli, al-Tubuly served as Head of Medicine Registration at the Libyan Ministry of Health.

=== Social activism ===
Al-Tubuly founded Maan Nabneeha Movement – Together We Build It (TWBI), a non-profit organisation that looks to engage young people and women in politics, in 2011. It founded the 1325 network, a collective of civil society organisations that looks to implement United Nations Security Council Resolution 1325, a resolution that focussed on women, peace and security. She co-authored the first civil report on the UNSCR 1325 which was launched in New York City in 2014. TWBI also established the Libyan Women Database, a network of professional women across Libya.

From 2012 al-Tubuly worked to empower women in the democratic process. She has encouraged women to be more involved with decision making and supporting them in running for office. She has questioned why the United Nations have not involved Libyan women in peace talks, when women have had suffered considerably during the war. She has discussed how war impacts women and girls' freedom of movement and access to education. She believes there should be a total ban on arms trade with Libya. Al-Tubuly has provided evidence to the United Nations Human Rights Council on women's rights in Libya. She serves as an Expert for the Council of Europe.

She was named as one of the BBC 100 Women in 2019.

== Selected publications ==
- al-Tubuly, Rida (1996). "Angiotensin II receptor expression and inhibition in the chronically hypoxic rat lung". British Journal of Pharmacology. 119 (6): 1217–1222. doi:10.1111/j.1476-5381.1996.tb16025.x. PMC 1915911. PMID 8937726.
- al-Tubuly, Rida (1996). "The regulation of pulmonary vascular tone". British Journal of Pharmacology. 42 (1): 127–131. doi:10.1046/j.1365-2125.1996.37117.x. PMC 2042648. PMID 8807153.
- al-Tubuly, Rida (2011). "Effects of Retama raetam (Forssk.) Webb & Berthel.(Fabaceae) on the central nervous system in experimental animals". Arch. Biol. Sci., Belgrade. 63 (4): 1015–1021. doi:10.2298/ABS1104015A.
