= Ibrahem al Nakkaa =

Financial and administrative official from Libya

Ibrahim Othman Al Nakkaa
- إبراهيم عثمان النكاع

Financial Services Controller of Al-Shuwairif
- Incumbent
- Assumed office 2019
- Minister: Ministry of Finance (Libya)

Personal details
- Born: 1990 (age 35–36) Al-Shuwairif, Libya
- Education: University of Al-Jabal,libya
- Occupation: Financial administrator

Ibrahim Othman Al Nakkaa (Arabic: إبراهيم عثمان النكاع), born in 1990, is a financial and administrative official from Libya. He the Financial Services of Al-Shuwairif at the Libyan Ministry of Finance and is the recipient of the Distinguished Leadership Award 2025. Also Nominated for the position of Operations Department Director at the High National Elections Commission.

== Brief Overview ==
He obtained a bachelor's degree from the Libyan Al-Jabal University and began his career in 2008, working in various such as education, health, agriculture, and the security directorate, and became an economic analyst interested in Libyan affairs. He also organized and supervised several sit ins and protests. and served as spokesperson for the Tebu Council of Elders in southwestern Libya.

== Awards and Honors ==
- Received the Distinguished Leadership Award 2025.
- Led the Financial Services Controller's Office to achieve second place (the Platinum Award).
- First place in closing the final accounts and submitting the inventory of assets and treasuries.
- Received an honor from the Accounts Department at the Ministry of Finance for his efforts in closing accounts 2025 .
