= Millieme =

Millieme is a French word meaning one thousandth of something. In English it may refer to:

- Millieme (angle), a French unit of plane angle similar to a milliradian.
- One thousandth of an Egyptian pound, Tunisian dinar, or Libyan pound.
