= Syed Irtafaq Ali =

Pakistani botanist (1930–2021)

- Born: 1930; Lucknow, India
- Died: 2021 (aged 90–91)
- Occupations: Botanist and plant taxonomist
- Known for: Vice chancellor of the University of Karachi

Syed Irtafaq Ali (1930–2021) was a Pakistani botanist and plant taxonomist who served as vice chancellor of the University of Karachi from 1990 to 1994.

== Life ==
Irtafaq Ali was born in Lucknow in 1930. He attended the University of Allahabad, where he earned a BSc in 1950 and an MSc in botany in 1952. After moving to Pakistan, he completed a PhD in botany at the University of London in 1958 and a DSc there in 1979.

He joined the University of Karachi as a lecturer in botany in 1958 and later served as chairman of the Department of Botany, dean of the Faculty of Science, and vice chancellor. From 1972 to 1976, he was a professor of botany at the University of Tripoli, in Libya.

Ali was a researcher and co-editor of Flora of Pakistan, said to be "the most comprehensive and authentic scientific work ever on Pakistan’s flora", and also contributed to Flora of Libya. He published four books. He received the Sitara-i-Imtiaz in 1988 and became professor emeritus at the University of Karachi in 2011.

He was a fellow of the Pakistan Academy of Sciences.
