= Khalifah Mustafa =

Libyan writer and novelist

- Born: 1944; Tripoli, Libya
- Died: 22 November 2008
- Education: BA in history
- Alma mater: University of Libya
- Occupation(s): writer, novelist, journalist

Khalifa Hussein Mustafa Al-Natah (Arabic:خليفة حسين مصطفى) was born in Tripoli in 1944, and lived in west street. He was a Libyan writer and novelist, and is considered as one of the early writer's of Libyan stories, and novels. During a period of over four decades, he published: short stories, children's literature, novels, plays, articles. He is also a literary critic. He first received his first education in his home town Tripoli, then moved to Benghazi to study history in University of Libya. His book ″The eye of the sun″ (original title: Ayn Al-Shams) was added to one of the best in hundred books in the 20th Century.

== Education and career ==
Khalifa Mustafa belonged to the post-independence generation of writers. Also, he was one of the founders of the Libyan novel, and the main contributor to its development.

In Tripoli, during his high school studies, he taught in an elementary school while also studying history at University of Libya in 1967. Mustafa worked at the university in the same year he graduated, and won a prize for teaching history at the university. He moved from teaching into journalism; in a literature newspaper was issued in the 70s called "Cultural week" (original title: Al-Usbu Al-Thaqafi). as he worked as a reporter in London for aljehad magazine, he started studying in London, which lead him to gain more skills in literature for studying English and western literature.

His first published short story he wrote, in a Libyan radio magazine, in 1967. He continued contributing to write more literature. He also wrote about the society and people's concerns, regarding to his nation; that lead him to write "tales of the western street" (original title: Hikayat Al-Shar’i Al-Gharbi). He lived in a difficult time; colonialism, and war was happening to his nation. Some of his work was influenced by the devastation, most of his novels were about historical events, "A Rose’s Wound" (original title: Jurh Al-Wardah), and "A Stars Night" (original title: Layali Najmah) was published in local and Arabian newspaper.

== Works ==
Some of his works include the followings:

- Crying of the Dead (original title: Sakhab Al-Mawta), 1975.
- The Rain and Mud Horses (original title: Al-Matar wa-Khuyul Al-Tin), 1981.
- The Words Memory (original title: Dhakirat Al-Kalimat), 1981.
- Tales of the Western Street (original title: Hikayat Al-Shar’i Al-Gharbi), 1982.
- Eye of the Sun (original title: Ayn Al-Shams), 1983.
- Rose’s Wound (original title: Jurh Al-Wardah), 1984.
- From the Tales of the Normal Madness (original title: Min Hikayat Al-Junun AlAadi), 1985.
- Autumn Wedding (original title: Urs Al-Khareef), 1986.
- The End of the Road (original title: Akher AL-Tareek) 1986.
- A Stars Night (original title: Layali Najmah), 1999.
- Widows and the Last Guardian (original title: Al-Aramil wa-Al-Wali Al-Akhir), 2005.

== Awards ==
- His novel “The eye of the sun” was published in 1983, was added to the Arab Writers Union as one of the best hundred books in the 20th Century.

== His Activities ==
- Participated in seminars, conferences, forums, and cultural journalism.
- Supervised, and criticized on so many of cultural newspaper sections, literary pages, radio programs.
- Discovered many literature talents, and encouraged it.

== His various positions ==
- A member of the literary novelist, and writers association.
- Editor of "Cultural Week" (original title: Al-Usbu Al-Thaqafi) magazine.
- The President of the children literature department in Dar Al-Jamahiriyah for publishing and distribution·
- The managing editor in Sanabil magazine.
- President of editing of the children literature department in Al-Amal magazine.

== His death ==
He died at 63 of age, a Friday morning of 22 November 2008, after struggling with cancer.
