= Ali Sahli =

Libyan politician

Libyan Foreign Minister
- In office 30 October 1956 – 14 March 1957
- Prime Minister: Mustafa Ben Halim
- Preceded by: Mustafa Ben Halim
- Succeeded by: Abdul Majid Kubar

Libyan Minister of Finance
- In office 26 April 1955 – 26 March 1956
- Prime Minister: Mustafa Ben Halim
- Preceded by: Ali Aneizi
- Succeeded by: Ismail Ben Lamin

Libyan Justice Minister
- In office 26 March – 30 October 1956
- Prime Minister: Mustafa Ben Halim
- Preceded by: Abdur Rahman al-Galhoud
- Succeeded by: Mohieddin Fikini

Personal details
- Born: 3 April 1924 Benghazi, Libya
- Died: 21 May 2004 (aged 80) Amman, Jordan

Ali S. El Sahli (علي الساحلي) (born Benghazi, Libya, 3 April 1924 – 21 May 2004 in Amman, Jordan) was a Libyan politician who held various government posts between 1952 and 1967.

== Education ==
- Bachelor of Laws (LLB) (London)
- Doctor of Letters (D.Litt.) (Venice)

== Posts held ==
* Nazir (Provincial Minister) of Justice, Cyrenaica	1952–1954
* President of the Executive Council (Provincial Prime Minister), Cyrenaica	1954
* Minister of Communications	1954–1955
* Minister of Finance	1955–1956
* Minister of Justice	1956
* Minister of Foreign Affairs	1956–1957
* Minister of Communications	1957
* Ambassador in Great Britain	1957–1958
* Chief of the Royal Diwan (The King's Cabinet)	1958–1965
* Ambassador in Italy	1965–1967
* Minister of the Interior	1967
* Practising Barrister	1967–1970
* Professor, Faculty of Arts and Education, University of Garyounis	1970–1986

== Decorations ==
* The Highest Order of Independence,	Grade 1	(LIBYA)
* The Highest Order of Independence,	Grade 1	(TUNISIA)
* The Highest Order of the Crown,	Grade 1	(MOROCCO)
* The Highest Order of King George,	Grade 1	(GREECE)
* The Highest Order of The Bright Star,	Grade 1	(CHINA)
* Knight of Great Cross,		(ITALY)
