= Muhammad Layas =

Libyan banker and politician

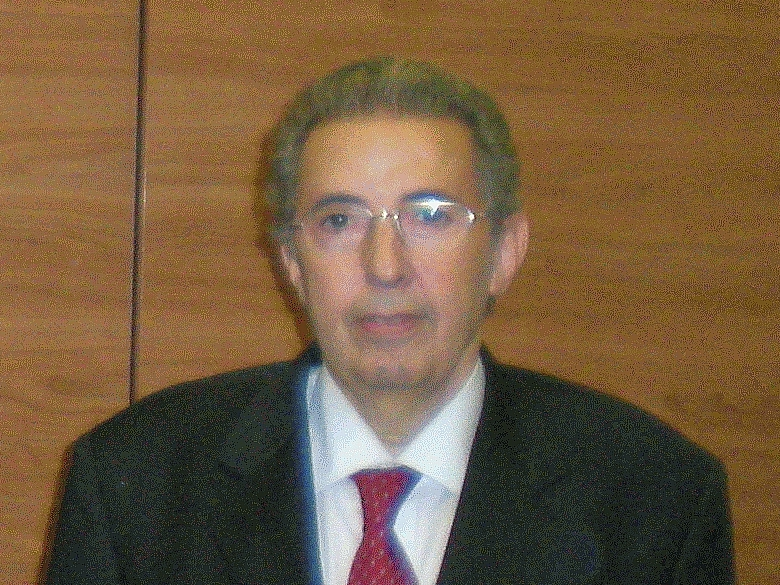
Muhammad Layas, 2010

Mohammed H. Layas is a prominent Libyan politician and investment banker.

== Education ==
He obtained a Bachelor of Arts degree in accounting and business management from University of Benghazi, Libya, and a Diploma of the Institute of Economic Development, in Washington.

== Politics ==
Layas has a long history of involvement in Libyan politics, serving as a foreign diplomat for Libya before the 1969 Al-Fatah Revolution which brought Muammar Gaddafi into power. Currently, Mr. Layas is a member of the Libyan governments General People's Committee (GPCO) for Finance.

== Banking ==
Layas has served as chairman and General Manager of the Libyan Arab Foreign Bank, the only bank authorized to conduct international banking transactions during sanctions. Additionally, he has been deputy chairman for the British Arab Commercial Bank (BACB) in London, UK until 2004, and the Banque Inter Continentale Arabe, in Paris, France. He was also Director of the Arab International Bank in Cairo, Egypt – in addition to membership on the boards of several other banks and investment companies.

Mr. Layas is Director of Banco Atlántico S.A. in Spain, and he joined the Board of the Bahrain-based Bank ABC in 2001: Additionally, since 2006 he has been president and chief executive officer of the Libyan Investment Authority.

== See also ==
- British Arab Commercial Bank
