= Sharifa al-Qiyadi =

Libyan novelist and short story writer (born 1947)

- Born: 1947 (age 78–79)
- Education: Al Fateh University

Sharifa al-Qiyadi (born 1947) is a Libyan novelist and short story writer.

Born in Tripoli, al-Qiyadi received her master's degree in humanities from Al Fateh University in 1981; her thesis was titled Journey of Libyan Women's Writing. Her first volume of short stories appeared two years later; it was followed by numerous others. A novel, This Is Me, appeared in 1997. Her work treats feminist themes; some of it discusses the improved condition of women under the regime of Muammar Gaddafi.
