= Libyan dinar =

Currency of Libya

دينار ليبي (Arabic)
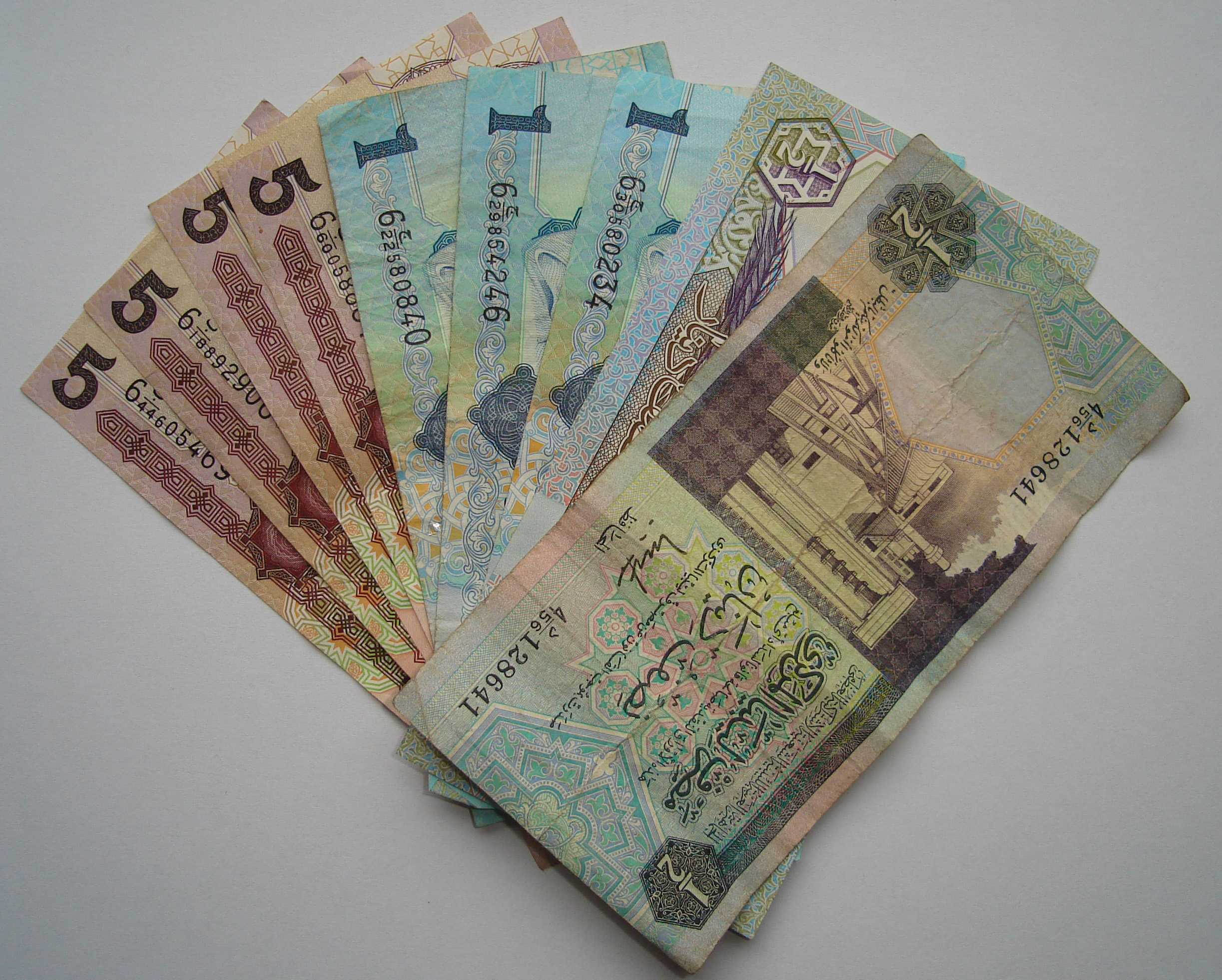
- Banknotes of 1/2, 1, and 5 dinars

ISO 4217
- Code: LYD (numeric: 434)
- Subunit: 0.001

Unit
- Symbol: LD and ل.د

Denominations
- Subunit
- 1/1000: dirham (dh.)
- Banknotes: LD 1, LD 5, LD 10, LD 20, LD 50
- Coins
- Freq. used: 50 dhs., 100 dhs., LD 1/4, LD 1/2
- Rarely used: 1 dh., 5 dhs., 10 dhs., 20 dhs.

Demographics
- Date of introduction: 1971
- Replaced: Libyan pound
- User(s): Libya

Issuance
- Central bank: Central Bank of Libya
- Website: www.cbl.gov.ly

Valuation
- Inflation: 6.1%
- Source: The World Factbook, 2012 est.

The dinar (Arabic: دينار (Arabic pronunciation: [diːˈnɑːr]); sign: LD in Latin, ل.د in Arabic; code: LYD) is the official currency of Libya. The dinar is divided into 1,000 dirhams (درهم). It is issued by the Central Bank of Libya, which also supervises the banking system and regulates credit.

== History ==
It was introduced in September 1971 and replaced the pound at par. The currency was pegged to the special drawing rights at a rate of 2.80 SDRs per dinar.

In 1972, the Libyan Arab Foreign Bank was established to deal with overseas investment.

In February 1973, the dinar was pegged to the US dollar at a rate of 0.29679 dinar per dollar (LD 1 = US$3.37), which was maintained until 1986. The peg was switched to the special drawing rights on 18 March 1986, with 1 dinar = 2.80 SDRs. On 1 May 1986, the dinar was allowed to trade in a 7.5% range of 2.80 SDRs. This range was expanded several times.

The currency started to devalue gradually relative to the US dollar in the mid-1990s, reaching a value of US$1.55 in 2001. The dinar was devalued by 50% to US$0.77 in 2002.

Ali Mohammed Salem, deputy governor of Central Bank of Libya, stated the exchange rate of Libyan dinar would be pegged to special drawing rights for one to three years, according to an interview to Reuters on 27 December 2011.

On 3 January 2021, the dinar was devalued to US$1 = LD 4.48 for all transactions following exchange rate unification, closing the gap between the official and black market exchange rates.

In April 2025, the Libyan dinar is facing an evaluation, results of the political situation in Libya.

== Coins ==
Until 1975, old coins denominated in milliemes (equal to the dirham) circulated. In 1975, coins were introduced in denominations of 1 Dh., 5 Dhs., 10 Dhs., 20 Dhs., 50 Dhs. and 100 Dhs. which bore the coat of arms of the Federation of Arab Republics. These were followed in 1979 by a second series of coins, in the same denominations, which bore a design of a horseman in place of the arms. LD 1/4 and LD 1/2 coins were issued in 2001 and 2004, respectively. In 2009, new 50 dhs., 100 dhs., LD 1/4 and LD 1/2 coins were issued. 1 dh., 5 dhs., 10 dhs., and 20 dhs. coins are rarely used as units of exchange. However, they still retain their status as legal tender.

In 2013 and 2014, the Central Bank of Libya issued LD 1/4 and LD 1/2 coins and 50 Dhs. and 100 Dhs. coins.

Current Libyan dinar coins
Image	Value	Composition	Diameter	Weight	Thickness	Edge	Issued
	50 dhs.	Copper-nickel-plated steel	23 mm	5.1 g	1.77 mm	Reeded	2014
	100 dhs.	Copper-nickel-plated steel	26 mm	6.54 g	1.9 mm	Plain	2014
	LD 1/4	Nordic gold	26 mm	6.55 g	2 mm	Reeded	2014
	LD 1/2	Bi-metallic nordic gold center in copper-nickel ring	27 mm	7.05 g	1.9 mm	Reeded	2014

== Banknotes ==
In 1971, banknotes were introduced in denominations of LD 1/4, LD 1/2, LD 1, LD 5 and LD 10. On May 15, 1980, new banknotes were issued for the LD 5 and LD 10 denominations (worth, at the time, £7 stg and £14 stg, or US$16 and US$32) and Libyan citizens were allowed one week to exchange their existing notes at the Central State Bank branches, after which the old LD 5 and LD 10 notes would be worthless. Persons making the exchange, however, were informed that only LD 1,000 worth of new notes would be allowed per customer, a move that "effectively wiped out the savings of the middle-class as well as the hoarded cash of the black marketeers" and that "brought a windfall of £1.5 billion to the cash-starved Treasury". After a public uproar, Leader Muammar Gaddafi announced on June 11 that although the seized money would not be confiscated or invested without full consultation with the 167 local "People's Congresses" in Libya.

Notes of LD 20 were added in 2002. On August 27, 2008, the Central Bank of Libya announced a new LD 50 note and that was scheduled to enter circulation on August 31, 2008. The note was already in circulation and featured Gaddafi on the obverse.

The subjects depicted on the banknotes have not changed since series 2 except for the portrait of Gaddafi which became the new obverse design of the LD 1 note in series 4.

After the overthrow of Gaddafi's government in the First Libyan Civil War of 2011, Central Bank Governor Gasem Azzoz said that notes with the ousted strongman's face on them were still in circulation and would be used by the National Transitional Council to pay the salaries of public servants and government employees. The bank is holding a contest for redesigned banknotes that will likely eventually replace the Gaddafi-emblazoned notes.

The central Bank started withdrawing the LD 50 note on January 14, 2012. Libyans have until March 15 to hand the note in to banks. Issam Buajila, the media manager of the central bank said that the LD 1 and LD 20 notes will be withdrawn from circulation soon. Omar Elkaber, governor of the central bank, stated that the bank has already started printing new notes.

The Central Bank of Libya has issued a revised LD 10 banknote with revised features, one example is the removal of the reference of the Gaddafi era "Jamahiriya" from upper right back, plus the use of English on the notes for the first time in two decades. Furthermore, the serial number prefix system has apparently been reset to "1". Two versions of the revised LD 10 banknote were issued, one with the central bank's name rendered with initial-capitals, which were printed by De La Rue of the UK and the other with the central bank's name in all capital letters were printed by Oberthur Technologies of France. Another notable differences for the two notes is both the holographic patch, the symbols on the top left corner on the notes and the date. The De La Rue version is identical to its previous issue, but the only notable difference is the serial number prefix, identified as "7A". The Oberthur Technologies issue has a different holographic patch, the addition of the crescent and star symbol on the top left corner of the note, the serial number prefix as "1" and the date 17.02.2011 (February 17, 2011, the date of the 2011 Libyan revolution and civil war) added below.

A revised LD 5 banknote was issued with altered features similar to the revised LD 10 banknote. The English text has replaced the Arabic text on the back, the removal of the Gaddafi era "Jamahiriya" from the front and upper right back of the note, and the Gaddafi era falcon crest has been removed from the monument to the Battle of Al-Hani.

On February 17, 2013, on the occasion of the second anniversary of the Libyan civil war, the Central Bank of Libya issued a LD 1 banknote, its first issue following the 2011 Libyan revolution and civil war. The front of the note depicts Anti-Gaddafi protesters with the flag of the Libyan rebels. The back of the note depicts the flag of Libya and peace doves.

On March 31, 2013, the Central Bank of Libya issued a LD 20 banknote. The predominantly orange-colored note features a school in Ghadames on the front and the Al-Ateeq mosque and the oasis of Oujla on the back.

In June 2013, the Central Bank of Libya issued a LD 50 banknote. The green-colored note features the Italian lighthouse in Benghazi on the front and the Rock formation in the Tadrart Acacus mountains on the back. This is the first note in Libya to utilize Crane's "Motion" thread.

Banknote Series of the Libyan dinar
Series	Denominations	Colours	Issued Dates	Note
1	LD 1/4, LD 1/2, LD 1, LD 5 and LD 10	Orange, purple, blue, olive and grey	1971–1972	
2	LD 1/4, LD 1/2, LD 1, LD 5 and LD 10	All green	1980–1981	
3	LD 1/4, LD 1/2, LD 1, LD 5 and LD 10	Green as the dominant colour, with brown, purple, blue, light green and multicoloured.	1984	
4	LD 1/4, LD 1/2, LD 1, LD 5 and LD 10	Multicoloured	1988 –ca. 1990	English text on LD 1/4, LD 1/2, and LD 5
4, revised	LD 1/4, LD 1/2, LD 1, LD 5 and LD 10	Slight change	ca. 1991–1993	English text on LD 1/4, LD 1/2, and LD 5 notes was removed
5	LD 1/4, LD 1/2, LD 1, LD 5, LD 10 and LD 20	Multicoloured	2002	
6	LD 1, LD 5 and LD 10	Blue, purple and green	2004	Easily visible foil (LD 1 and LD 5) or hologram (LD 10) on upper left on the obverse as the new anti-counterfeit device
7	LD 1, LD 5, LD 10, LD 20 (Series 2), LD 50 (Series 1)	Blue, red and green	2008–2009	Reworked designs and enhanced security features
7A	LD 5 and LD 10	Red (LD 5), Green (LD 10)	2011-2012	Identical to the Series 7 issues, but with the removal of the references to the Gaddafi era "Jamahiriya"
1 (2013)	LD 1, LD 5, LD 10, LD 20, LD 50	Multicolored	2013–2025	First series of banknotes after the 2011 Libyan revolution
2 (2019)	LD 1	Blue	2019–present	First banknote of the Libyan dinar to be issued on polymer substrate, to commemorate the 8th anniversary of the 2011 Libyan Revolution
3 (2021)	LD 5	Brown	2021–present	Second banknote of the Libyan dinar to be issued on polymer substrate
4 (2025)	LD 20	Orange	2025–present	Third banknote of the Libyan dinar to be issued on polymer substrate

=== Current series ===
Current Series
Image		Value	Main Colour	Description	
Obverse	Reverse	Value	Main Colour	Obverse	Reverse
		LD 1	Blue-Violet	Building of Central Bank of Libya	Arch of Septimius Severus and Ras Lanuf Oil Refinery
		LD 5	Brown	Ottoman Clock Tower	Zeus Temple in Cyrene
		LD 10	Blue	Omar al-Mukhtar	Al Mukhtar horsemen
		LD 20	Orange	Al Ateeq mosque in Oujlah	Traditional school in Ghadames
		LD 50	Green	Italian Lighthouse of Sede Khrebeech	Stone arch in Tadrart Acacus

== Popular nomenclature and denominations ==
The Libyan dinar is commonly called jni, [ʒni] (western Libyan Dialect) or jneh [ʒneh] (eastern Libyan dialect), derived from the name of British guinea (cf genēh جنيه for the Egyptian pound), a gold coin worth twenty-one shillings. The authorized fractional unit, the dirham, is never mentioned in everyday conversation. Garsh - a variant of the word qirsh - is employed instead, with 1 garsh = 10 dirhams. One thousand dinars is stylishly called a kilo [kiːlu]. Similarly, five dinar notes and ten dinar notes are sometimes nicknamed, in the younger generation male slang, faifa [faːifa] and tsena [tseːna] respectively, which are playful feminizations of the English words five and ten, but may also be remnants of British slang words 'fiver' and 'tenner' for five and ten pound notes respectively. Libyan currency is nicknamed by Libyans ʿOmar El-Mokhtar after the Libyan freedom fighter who is featured on the obverse of the LD 10 note.

== Eastern Libyan dinar ==
Since 2016, the Central Bank of Libya allied with the House of Representatives and issued its own Libyan dinar, with banknotes for LD 20 and LD 50 and a LD 1 coin, which was printed and coined by Goznak in Russia. They were issued in response to a shortage of cash in the eastern half of the country, reflecting the disunity of Libya that has two rival governments in the east and west.

Current LYD exchange rates
From Google Finance:	AUD CAD CHF CNY EUR GBP HKD JPY USD EUR JPY USD
From Yahoo! Finance:	AUD CAD CHF CNY EUR GBP HKD JPY USD EUR JPY USD
From XE.com:	AUD CAD CHF CNY EUR GBP HKD JPY USD EUR JPY USD
From OANDA:	AUD CAD CHF CNY EUR GBP HKD JPY USD EUR JPY USD

== See also ==
- Economy of Libya
- Algerian dinar
- Tunisian dinar

Libyan dinar
Preceded by: Libyan pound Reason: Revolution (in 1969); Ratio: at par	Currency of Libya; 1971 –	Succeeded by: Current
