= British Arab Commercial Bank =

International bank

British Arab Commercial Bank PLC
- Type: Public limited company
- Industry: Banking, Financial services
- Founded: First established in 1972 as UBAF Limited; Renamed British Arab Commercial Bank in 1996
- Headquarters: London, England, UK
- Area served: Middle East & Africa
- Key people: Dr Yousef Abdullah Al Awadi KBE (Group Chairman); Paul Jennings (Group Chief Executive)
- Services: Trade finance, lending and structured finance, treasury, real estate lending
- Revenue: ▲£57.4 million (2023)
- Operating income: ▲£87.9 million (2023)
- Net income: ▲£27.9 million (2023)
- Total assets: ▼£3.0 billion (2023)
- Total equity: ▲£233 million (2023)
- Number of employees: ▼195 (2022)
- Website: www.bacb.co.uk

The British Arab Commercial Bank PLC (BACB) is an international wholesale bank incorporated in the United Kingdom that is authorised by the Prudential Regulation Authority (PRA) and regulated by the PRA and the Financial Conduct Authority (FCA). It was founded in 1972 as UBAF Limited, adopted its current name in 1996, and registered as a public limited company in 2009. The bank has clients trading in and out of developing markets in the Middle East and Africa.

BACB has a head office in London, and three representative offices in Algiers in Algeria, Tripoli in Libya and Abidjan in the Cote D'Ivoire. The bank has 17 sister banks across Europe, Asia and Africa. It is owned by three main shareholders - the Libyan Foreign Bank (87.80%), Banque Centrale Populaire (6.10%) and Banque Extérieure d'Algérie (6.10%).

The bank provides services of trade finance, treasury, real estate lending, banking and payment services, and asset distribution and syndication. The current chairman is Dr Yousef Abdullah Al Awadi, and the current chief executive officer is Paul Jennings.

== History ==
=== Origins ===
The bank was founded in 1972 as UBAF Limited and changed its name to UBAF Bank Limited in 1977. It began as an affiliate of Midland Bank, and became an affiliate of HSBC when HSBC took over Midland Bank in 1992. The bank adopted the name British Arab Commercial Bank in 1996.

=== Since 2009 ===
In 2009, Commercial Bank of Egypt sold its 8% stake. At the time, the other shareholders were HSBC (49%), Libyan Foreign Bank (26%), Bank Al-Maghrib (8%), and Banque Extérieure d’Algérie (8%). Banque Centrale Populaire eventually bought out Bank Al-Maghrib and thus gained a stake in BACB.

In 2010, HSBC sold its 49% shareholding to the Libyan Foreign Bank ("LFB"), a subsidiary of the Central Bank of Libya ("CBL"). Its share is 87.80%, with the other shareholders being Banque Centrale Populaire (6.10%), and Banque Extérieure d’Algérie (6.10%). On 2 June 2009, the Bank changed its corporate status from that of a private to a public company.

In 2016, the bank opened a new representative office in Abidjan, to add to its existing representative offices in Algiers, and in Tripoli.

== Operating area ==
=== Africa ===
BACB aims to facilitate cross-border trade through a sustainable revenue base with its chosen clients and markets. The bank is known for dealing with markets with which larger banks are often hesitant to do business, such as Middle Eastern and North African markets. The bank serves the rest of the African continent through relationships with a number of financial institutions and correspondent banks, particularly in Nigeria and Ghana.

=== Europe ===
While the majority of the bank's clients are African and Middle Eastern companies and institutions, working with them brings it into regular contact with European exporters and importers. The bank also has sister banks in European countries, including Spain, Italy and France.

== See also ==
- SABB
