= Sahara Bank =

- Company type: Private company
- Industry: Finance
- Founded: 1964; 62 years ago
- Headquarters: Tripoli, Libya
- Products: Financial services
- Website: www.saharabank.com.ly

The Sahara Bank (Arabic: مصرف الصحارى) is a Libyan commercial bank, established in 1964. The bank performs retail and corporate banking operations and its head office is located in Tripoli.

== History ==
The Sahara Bank was established in 1964 as a subsidiary of Banco di Sicilia.

On 22 December 1970, a law was passed that demanding that all foreign bank shares be nationalized and completely owned by Libya. As of 1991, the principal shareholder was Central Bank of Libya with 82 per cent and Libyan Interests with the rest of 18 per cent. The bank had 751 employees in its roles. The head office of the bank was located in Libya's capital, Tripoli. The bank was counted as one of the ten major banks under the control of the Central Bank of Libya.

In July 2007, France's BNP Paribas acquired 19 per cent share of the Sahara bank. It also became the major shareholder and took over the operations. BNP pulled out of the operations of the bank in 2011, following revolutions in Libya.

== Operations ==
The bank performs retail and commercial banking operations and offers international trade centre services. It also facilitates mass payments, POS payments, treasury services, car leasing, Islamic Banking, and Italian desk services. The bank provides fund transfer services like international transfers and treasury services to its corporate clients.

== See also ==
- List of banks in Libya
