= Ministry of Finance Annual Excellence Award =

Annual award given by Libyan Ministry of Finance

- Ministry of Finance Institutional Excellence Award - Libya
- Sponsored by: Ministry of Finance
- Location: Tripoli
- Country: Libya
- First award: 2024
- Website: mof.gov.ly

The Ministry of Finance Annual Excellence Award (Arabic: جائزة التميز المؤسسي) is an annual institutional award granted by the Libyan Ministry of Finance to its affiliated financial services controllerships and offices. It is awarded based on criteria related to institutional, administrative, and financial performance, with the aim of encouraging excellence, improving performance efficiency, and promoting the principles of governance, transparency, and compliance with financial legislation.

The award was established pursuant to Ministerial Decree No. (411) of 2024, which defined the award's objectives, the mechanism of the permanent committee, the evaluation criteria and conditions, and how results are announced and approved.

== History ==
The Ministry of Finance launched the award as part of the institutional performance development program for financial services controllerships and offices, aiming to create a competitive system among its administrative units, encourage compliance with financial and administrative standards, and improve the quality of public services. The Permanent Committee for the Institutional Excellence Award evaluates participating controllerships and offices according to approved criteria before the final results are approved by the Minister of Finance.

== Objectives ==
The award aims to:

- Raise the level of institutional performance.
- Enhance governance and transparency.
- Encourage compliance with financial laws and regulations.
- Improve the quality of financial and administrative services.
- Support a culture of excellence and positive competition.
- Honor outstanding units and employees.

== Evaluation Criteria ==
The specialized committee relies on several criteria for evaluation, most notably:

- Preparing closing accounts within legal deadlines.
- Completing treasury and warehouse inventory work.
- Inventorying fixed and movable assets.
- Soundness of the documentary cycle.
- Compliance with financial legislation and regulations.
- Quality of financial and administrative reports.
- Application of internal control and governance principles.

== Awards ==
The awards are granted to the financial services controllerships and offices that achieve the highest evaluation scores, including:

- The Diamond Award.
- The Platinum Award.
- The Gold Award.
- The Silver Award.
- The Bronze Award.

The Ministry also grants a number of individual awards to honor outstanding leaders and employees in the winning entities.

== Winners ==
Cycle	Fiscal Year	Award	Rank	Winning Entity (الجهة الفائزة)
First	2024	Diamond Award	First	Batin Al-Jabal Al-Gharbi Financial Services Controllership (Arabic: مراقبة الخدمات المالية باطن الجبل)
First	2024	Platinum Award	Second	Al-Shuwayrif Financial Services Controllership (Arabic: مراقبة الخدمات المالية الشويرف)
First	2024	Gold Award	Third	Jadu Financial Services Office (Arabic: مراقبة الخدمات المالية جاذو)
First	2024	Silver Award	Fourth	Zintan Financial Services Controllership (Arabic: مراقبة الخدمات المالية الزنتان)
First	2024	Bronze Award	Fifth	Msallata Financial Services Controllership (Arabic: مراقبة الخدمات المالية مسلاته)

== Individual Awards ==
The first edition of the award witnessed the honoring of a number of leaders and employees in the winning entities, including:

- Distinguished Leadership Award (Platinum): Ibrahim Othman Al-Nakkaa (Arabic: إبراهيم عثمان النكاع) – Al-Shuwayrif Financial Services Controllership (مراقبة الخدمات المالية الشويرف).
- Distinguished Leadership Award (Diamond): Ahneen Nasser Shaninah (Arabic: احنين ناصر شنين) – Batin Al-Jabal Financial Services Controllership (مراقبة الخدمات المالية باطن الجبل).
- Distinguished Leadership Award (Silver): Mohammed Ajaj (Arabic: محمد عجاج)) – Zintan Financial Services Controllership (مراقبة الخدمات المالية الزنتان).

== Results Updates ==
This page is updated by adding the results of each new edition after they are announced and officially approved by the Ministry of Finance, documented with published references.

== See Also ==
- Ministry of Finance (Libya)
