= Naji Mohamed Issa Belqasem =

Libyan goverenment official

His Excellency Naji Mohamed Issa Belqasem
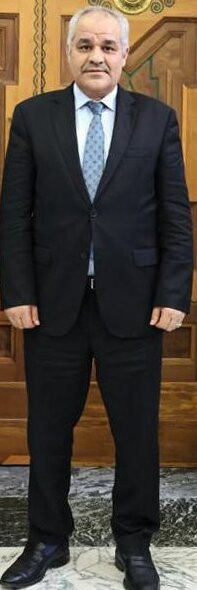

Governor of the Central Bank of Libya
- In office 6 October 2024 – 22 October 2026
- Deputy: Miree Al-Barasee
- Preceded by: Abdel Fattah Ghafar
- Succeeded by: Fawzi Boukhzam

Naji Mohamed Issa Belqasem (born 1965) is a Libyan economist who has been the governor of the Central Bank of Libya since 2024. He previously served in various governmental roles, as well as in the private sector. His appointment was the first to be approved by all branches of the Libyan government: the House of Representatives, the High Council of State, and the Presidential Council, after the United Nations mediated an agreement to install new leadership at the Central Bank.

== Early life and education ==
Belqasem was born in 1965 in Benghazi, Libya. He graduated with honors from University of Tripoli with a degree in economics in 1987. He attended graduate school in the United Kingdom, first earning a master's degree at the London School of Economics in finance, and later a PhD in monetary policy from Cambridge University.

== Career ==
Belqasem joined the Central Bank during the regime of Muammar Gaddafi. He was appointed Deputy Governor in 2005. During his tenure, he played a large role in Libya's domestic attempts to ensure economic stability given the economic sanctions placed on it due to the Gaddafi regime's notorious human rights record.

Following the overthrow of Gaddafi in the 2011 Libyan civil war, Belqasem left public service. He served as a private economic consultant for multiple international institutions, most notably the International Monetary Fund. He re-entered public service in the Libyan government in 2018 as senior advisor to the Minister of Finance. During his time there, he served a similar role to that which he filled in the early 2000s, namely directing policies on economic stability.

== Appointment as governor ==
Since the 2011 civil war, much of eastern Libya has been controlled by Khalifa Haftar. In the rest of the country, power has remained divided between the House of Representatives and the High Council of State. Appointing officials requires the consent of both, which is extremely hard to procure.

In September 2024, the United Nations Support Mission in Libya mediated talks between the House of Representatives and the High Council of State on the appointment of new leadership at the Central Bank. The previous governor, Abdel Fattah Ghafar, had been rejected by both legislative bodies. On 26 September, the United Nations announced that Belqasem had been appointed governor, with Maree Moftah al-Baraasi as his Deputy. He was installed on 3 October.

Belqasem is the first CBL governor to be approved by Libya's legislatures since the civil war. Previous governors, including his predecessor, had been appointed only by the Presidential Council, a body that functions of an executive branch, and thus had often been in constant disagreement with the legislatures which had never approved their nomination. Therefore, his appointment was widely speculated as a step towards stability in the country.
