= Rashd Abu Ghaffa =

Libyan politician and Minister of Finance

Rashd Abu Ghaffa راشد أبوغفة

Minister of Finance
- In office 15 March 2026 – Present
- President: Mohammad al-Menfi
- Prime Minister: Abdul Hamid Dbeibeh
- Preceded by: Khaled Al-Mabrouk

Military service
- Allegiance: Government of National Unity

Rashed Saleh Al-Sagheer Abu Ghaffa (Arabic: راشد صالح الصغير أبوغفة) is a Libyan government official who has served as the Minister of Finance in the Government of National Unity since 15 March 2026, having previously served as the Secretary-General of the Prime Minister's Office.

== Early career ==
Abu Ghaffa served as the Director of the Department of Administrative and Financial Affairs at the Ministry of Foreign Affairs and International Cooperation, appearing in this capacity during official coverages of the ministry's activities in 2023, such as visits by foreign delegations to Tripoli.

Later, he assumed the position of Secretary-General of the Prime Minister's Office within the Government of National Unity. In this capacity, he participated in several governmental meetings addressing public projects, municipal affairs, and market price regulation throughout 2025 and 2026.

== Minister of Finance ==
On 15 March 2026, Abu Ghaffa officially assumed office as Minister of Finance in the Government of National Unity, succeeding Khaled Al-Mabrouk. The handover ceremony took place at the Ministry of Finance headquarters in Tripoli in the presence of an assigned Cabinet committee and ministry officials. Following his inauguration, he convened with ministry leadership to emphasize financial sector reform, stability enhancement, and public service improvement.
