= Tarek Ben Halim =

Libyan banker, philanthropist and activist (1955–2009)

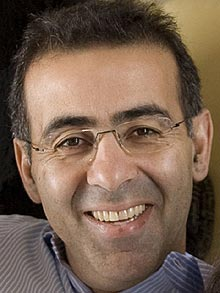
- Born: 4 December 1955; Tripoli, Libya
- Died: 11 December 2009 (aged 54); London, England
- Occupation: Investment banker
- Known for: Founder of Alfanar
- Spouse: Cynthia Oakes
- Children: 3
- Father: Mustafa Ben Halim
- Relatives: John Bertram Oakes (father-in-law)

Tarek Ben Halim (4 December 1955 – 11 December 2009) was a Libyan investment banker and social investor focused on social-sector projects. He founded Alfanar, the Arab venture philanthropy organization. He left the banking sector in 2000.

== Early life ==
Ben Halim was born on 4 December 1955 in Tripoli, Libya. His mother, Yusra Kanaan, was of Palestinian descent, and his father, Mustafa Ahmed Ben Halim, was a Libyan of Egyptian descent. Mustafa Ben Halim served as the prime minister of Libya from 1954 to 1957 and as the Libyan ambassador to France from 1958 to 1960.

Following the 1969 coup that brought Muammar Gaddafi to power, the family left Libya. They moved to Beirut and later settled in London. He attended Atlantic College in Wales and studied finance at the University of Warwick. He later received an MBA from Harvard Business School.

== Career ==
Ben Halim worked in investment banking at JP Morgan, Credit Suisse First Boston, and Goldman Sachs, where he became a managing director. In 2000, he oversaw the $2 billion flotation of Turkcell, which at the time was reportedly the largest emerging-market IPO. In a February 2003 commentary for The Los Angeles Times, he criticized Arab governments for being “self‑serving, unrepresentative governments that have, with few exceptions, ruled the Arab world since the 19th century.” He expressed hope that removing Saddam Hussein’s regime in Iraq would usher in broader leadership changes across the region. He also volunteered to work with British forces.

After being appointed deputy director of private sector development within the Coalition Provisional Authority (CPA), Ben Halim said he disagreed with what he perceived as the CPA’s emphasis on short‑term gains rather than establishing a sustainable framework to last beyond its tenure. He resigned after several months.

In 2004, Tarek Ben Halim founded Alfanar (meaning "lighthouse" in Arabic), an organization that supports the development of civil society in the Arab world by promoting organizations that address long-term community needs in disadvantaged areas.

== Death ==
Tarek Ben Halim died from brain cancer on 11 December 2009 at the age of 54. He was married to Cynthia Oakes, a Princeton graduate and daughter of U.S. journalist John Bertram Oakes.
