= Muhammad az-Zaruq Rajab =

Prime Minister of Libya (born 1940)

Muhammad az-Zaruq Rajab محمد الزروق رجب

Prime Minister of Libya
- In office 16 February 1984 – 3 March 1986
- Leader: Muammar Gaddafi
- Preceded by: Jadallah Azzuz at-Talhi
- Succeeded by: Jadallah Azzuz at-Talhi

Secretary-General of the General People's Congress
- In office 7 January 1981 – 15 February 1984
- Leader: Muammar Gaddafi
- Preceded by: Abdul Ati al-Obeidi
- Succeeded by: Mifta al-Usta Umar

Governor of the Central Bank of Libya
- In office 4 January 1987 – 6 October 1990
- Preceded by: Rajab El Msallati
- Succeeded by: Abd-al-Hafid Mahmud al-Zulaytini
- In office 2 April – August 2011
- Preceded by: Abd-al-Hafid Mahmud al-Zulaytini (acting)
- Succeeded by: Kassem Azzuz

Personal details
- Born: 7 March 1940 (age 86) Italian Libya

Muhammad az-Zaruq Rajab (Arabic: محمد الزروق رجب) (born 7 March 1940) is a former Head of State and General Secretary of the People's Committee (Prime Minister) in Libya.

Rajab was General Secretary of the General People's Congress from January 7, 1981 to February 15, 1984. From 16 February 1984 to 3 March 1986 he was the prime minister of Libya. He was Minister of Treasury from 1972 to 1977, and Secretary of Finance from 1977 to 1981.
