= Ali Aneizi =

Libyan politician

Libyan Minister of Finance
- In office 18 September 1953 – 26 April 1955
- Preceded by: Abu Bakr Naama
- Succeeded by: Ali Sahli

Libyan Minister of Economy
- In office 18 September 1953 – 11 April 1954
- Preceded by: Abu Bakr Naama
- Succeeded by: Mustapha al-Sarraj

Governor of the National Bank of Libya
- In office 26 April 1955 – 26 March 1961
- Preceded by: none
- Succeeded by: Khalil Bennani

Libyan Minister of Petroleum
- In office 13 November 1963 – 26 March 1964
- Preceded by: Wahbi al-Bouri
- Succeeded by: Fouad Kabazi

Personal details
- Born: 1904
- Died: 1983 (aged 78–79)

Ali Noureddin el-Anezi, or Ali Noureddin al-Unayzi (Arabic: علي نور الدين العنيزي) (1904–1983) was a Libyan politician. He was the first governor of the Central Bank of Libya. Before Libya's independence, he was a member of the "Liberation of Libya" committee. During this time, he succeeded in convincing Emile Saint-Lot, Haiti's representative to the United Nations, to vote against the Bevin-Sforza Plan, a plan to make the three regions of Libya (Tripolitania, Cyrenaica, and Fezzan) under the mandate of three countries (Italy, the United Kingdom, and France respectively). Saint-Lot's vote was decisive in the plan's refusal.

After Libya gained independence, he became Minister of Finance, a position he held from 1953 to 1955. He became the first governor of the central bank of Libya in April 1955, an office he had held to March 1961.

After leaving office, he became the ambassador of Libya to Lebanon, and later then a minister of petroleum (November 1963–March 1964).
