= List of banks in Libya =

This is a list of banks in Libya, as reported in 2024.

== List of banks ==
- Agricultural Bank of Libya, state-owned
- Alejmaa Alarabi Bank
- Aman Bank for Commerce and Investment (ABCI)
- Bank of Valletta
- Jumhouria Bank, state-owned
- Libyan Foreign Bank, state-owned
- Mediterranean Bank
- National Commercial Bank, state-owned
- Sahara Bank, state-owned
- Wafa Bank
- Umma Bank
- United Bank for Commerce & Investment
- Waha Bank (Oasis Bank)
- Wahda Bank, state-owned
- Andalus Bank

== See also ==
- Banque Sahélo-Saharienne pour l'Investissement et le Commerce
- List of banks in the Arab world
