= Hassan Bouhadi =

Libyan civil servant

Hassan Ahmed Bouhadi (حسن بوهادي; born 1973) was the Chairman of the Board of Directors of the Libyan Investment Authority (LIA), Libya's sovereign wealth fund, a position he has occupied from October 2014 to June 2016, after serving as a member of LIA’s Board of Directors and as Secretary of the Board of Trustees. He was appointed by the internationally recognised government and set up office in Malta.

Educated at University College London and Imperial College of Science and Technology, Bouhadi coordinated humanitarian activities with the international community as a member of the Libyan Stabilization Team under the National Transitional Council. Bouhadi held several regional management positions in the UK, Middle East and Africa for multinational companies, including Bechtel International, Fosroc (a BP company), BASF and GE.
