= Ministry of Finance (Libya) =

- وزارة المالية

Agency overview
- Jurisdiction: Government of Libya
- Minister responsible: Rashd Abu Ghaffa, Minister of Finance
- Website: www.mof.gov.ly

The Ministry of Finance of Libya (Arabic: وزارة المالية ليبيا) is the finance ministry responsible for public finances of Libya.

== Ministers of Finance of the Kingdom of Libya ==
- Mansour Qadara, 1951-1953
- Abu Bakr Naama, 1953
- Ali Aneizi, 1953-1955
- Ismail bin Al-Amin, 1956-1958
- Miftah Uraigib, 1958
- Ismail bin Al-Amin, 1958-1960
- Muhammad Osman Said, 1960
- Salim Lutfi al-Qadi, 1960-1961
- Ahmed al-Hasairi, 1961-1962
- Mohamed Suleiman Burbidah, 1962-1963
- Mansour bin Qadara, 1963-1964
- Salim Lutfi al-Qadi, 1964
- Omar Al-Baruni, 1964-1965
- Salim Lutfi al-Qadi, 1965-1968
- Abd Al-Hadi Qaoud, 1968-1969

== Ministers of Treasury of the Libyan Arab Republic ==
- Mahmud Suleiman Maghribi, 1969-1970
- Mohamed Hulayel El Rabi'i, 1970
- Umar Muhayshi, 1970
- Abdessalam Jalloud, 1970-1972
- Muhammad az-Zaruq Rajab, 1972-1977

== Secretaries of Finance of the Great Socialist People's Libyan Arab Jamahiriya ==
- Muhammad az-Zaruq Rajab, 1977-1981
- Muhammad al-Qasim Sharlalah, 1981-1987
- Muhammad al-Madani al-Bukhari, 1987-1994
- Muhammad Bayt al-Mal, 1994-2001
- Abd al-Salam al-Burayni, 2001-2004
- Muhammad al-Huwayj, 2004-2006
- Ahmed Munaysi Abd-al-Hamid, 2006-2007
- Muhammad al-Huwayj, 2007-2009
- Abd-al-Hafid Mahmud al-Zulaytini, March 2009 - August 2011

== Ministers of Finance since 2011 ==
Note: Several rival governments since 2014.

- NTC: Ali Tarhouni, March 2011 - November 2011
- NTC: Hasan Zaglam, December 2011 - October 2012
- GNC: Alkilani Abdel-Qadir al-Jazi, November 2012 - March 2014
- GNC: Milud Ahmed Khalifa Hamid, May 2014 - June 2014
- NSG: Younis al-Barasi, September 2014 – August 2015
- NSG: Osama Ben Naji, August 2015 – April 2016???
- GNA: Fakhr Muftah Bufernah, April 2016 - ?
- GNA: Fakhir Abu Farna, ?- July 2016
- GNA: Osama Hammad, November 2016 - October 2018
- GNA: Faraj Boumtari, October 2018 - March 2021
- HoR: Kamal Al-Hassi, September 2014 - May 2020
- GNU: Khaled Al-Mabrouk Abdullah, March 2021 – March 2026 - present
- GNS: Osama Hamad, March 2022 - present
- GNU: Rashd Abu Ghaffa, March 2026 - present

== Awards and Initiatives ==
As part of the Ministry of Finance's efforts to develop institutional performance and motivate its administrative units to adhere to professional standards and legal regulations, the Ministry launched several initiatives and competitive awards, most notably:

- Ministry of Finance Annual Excellence Award: Established by Ministerial Decree No. (411) of 2024, it is an annual institutional award aimed at evaluating and honoring financial services controllerships and offices across various Libyan municipalities according to precise criteria, including governance, transparency, adherence to the documentary cycle, preparation of closing accounts, and treasury inventory within legal deadlines.

Below are the names of the controllerships that achieved advanced positions in the Ministry of Finance Annual Excellence Award:

Cycle	Year	Award	Rank	Winning Entity (الجهة الفائزة)	Reference
First	2024	Diamond	First	Batin Al-Jabal Al-Gharbi Financial Services Controllership (مراقبة الخدمات المالية باطن الجبل الغربي)	
First	2024	Platinum	Second	Al-Shuwayrif Financial Services Controllership (مراقبة الخدمات المالية الشويرف)	
First	2024	Gold	Third	Jadu Financial Services Office (مكتب الخدمات المالية جادو)	
First	2024	Silver	Fourth	Zintan Financial Services Controllership (مراقبة الخدمات المالية الزنتان)	
First	2024	Bronze	Fifth	Msallata Financial Services Controllership (مراقبة الخدمات المالية مسلاتة)	

The Annual Excellence Award also witnessed the honoring of a number of leaders and employees working in the financial services controllerships, most notably:

Cycle	Year	Award	Recipient (المتحصل عليها)	Entity (الجهة)	Reference
First	2024	Distinguished Leadership Award (Diamond)	Ahneen Nasser Shaninah (أحنين ناصر شنينة)	Batin Al-Jabal Al-Gharbi Financial Services Controllership (مراقبة الخدمات المالية باطن الجبل الغربي)	
First	2024	Distinguished Leadership Award (Platinum)	Ibrahim Othman Al-Nikaa (إبراهيم عثمان النكاع)	Al-Shuwayrif Financial Services Controllership (مراقبة الخدمات المالية الشويرف)	
First	2024	Distinguished Leadership Award (Silver)	Mohammed Ajaj (محمد عجاج)	Zintan Financial Services Controllership (مراقبة الخدمات المالية الزنتان)	

== Affiliated bodies ==
Several entities and institutions are affiliated with the Ministry of Finance, including:

- Savings and Real Estate Investment Bank
- Information and Documentation Center
- General Company for Administrative Centers Services
- National Investment Company
- Libyan Customs Authority
- Libyan Tax Authority
- Regional Financial Services Controllerships
- Rural Bank
- Fund for the Liquidation of Public Companies and Dissolved Apparatuses

=== Financial Services Controllerships ===
The Financial Services Controllerships spread across various regions and municipalities are affiliated with the Ministry of Finance in Libya. They oversee the implementation of the general budget and monitor the financial affairs of public entities within their geographical jurisdiction, in accordance with the legislation governing the financial sector.

Among these controllerships are: the financial services controllerships of Al-Shuwayrif, Al-Abyar, Al-Khums, Zintan, Bint Biyyah (or Bent Beyya), Zuetina, Musaid, Al-Hawamid, Al-Ajaylat, Suluq, Al-Bayda, Derna, Tobruk, Nalut, Tripoli, Gharyan, Sabha, and Jufra.

== See also ==
- Central Bank of Libya
