= University of Libya =

University in Libya

- الجامعة الليبية
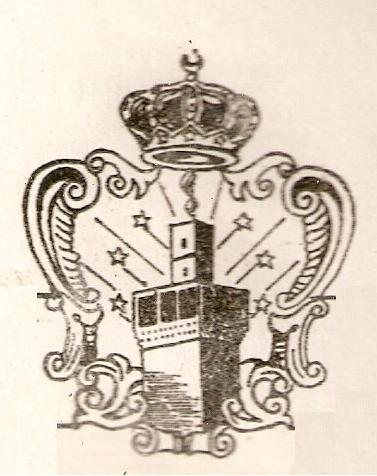
- Logo of the University of Libya
- Type: Public
- Active: 15 December 1955–1973
- Location: Tripoli & Benghazi, Libya
- The university was split between Tripoli and Benghazi universities.

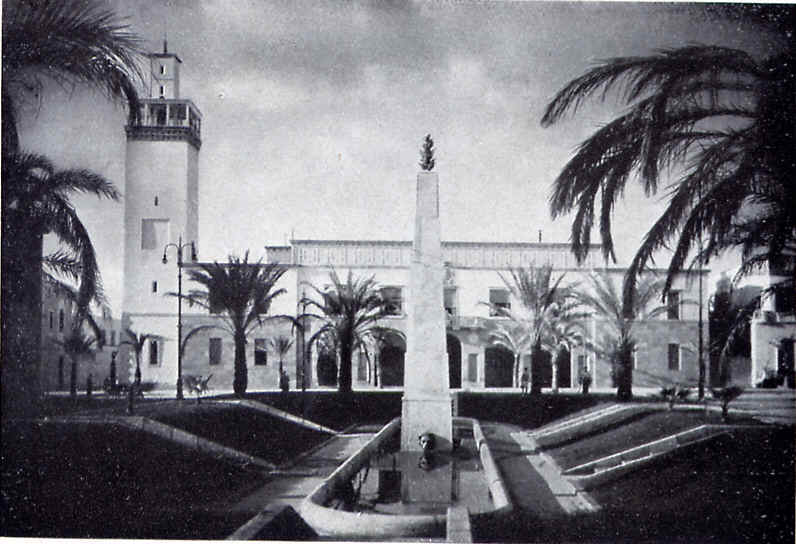
Founded by royal decree in 1955, al Manar Palace in Benghazi was the first campus

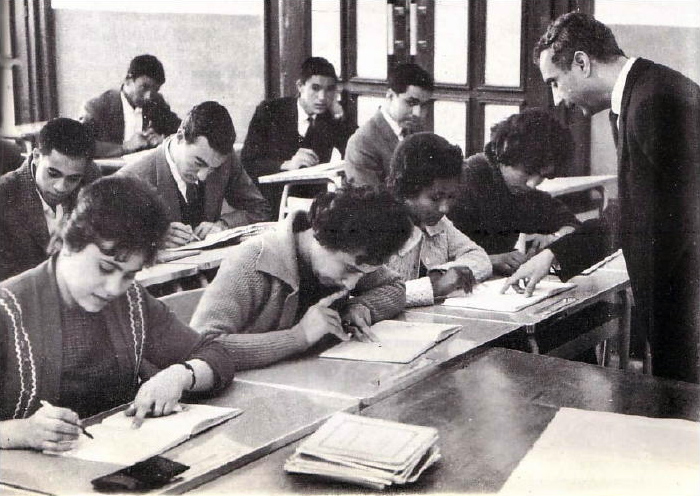
Students during a seminar at the university (1966)

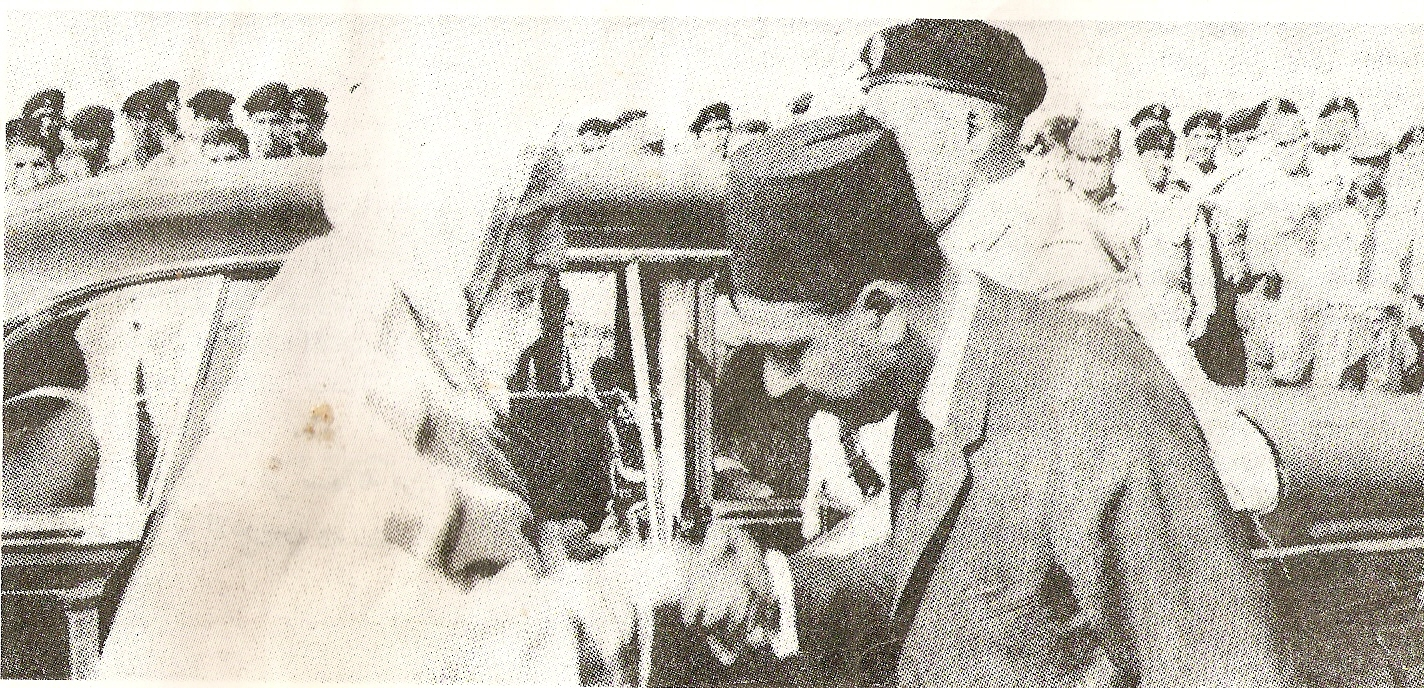
King Idris (left) shaking hands with Prime Minister Wanis al-Qaddafi at the establishment of the new campus of the university in 1968

The University of Libya (Arabic: الجامعة الليبية) was a public university based in Tripoli and Benghazi, Libya. The university was established in 1955 and disestablished in 1973, when its colleges were split into two new universities: the University of Tripoli (later Al Fateh University) in Tripoli, and the University of Benghazi (later Garyounis University) in Benghazi.

== History ==
=== Origins ===
Despite its difficult economic situation at the time, in the 1950s the Libyan government decided to found a university. Towards that goal it sent a delegation to Egypt in 1955 to meet the then-prime minister Gamal Abdul Nasser, and request him to lend some lecturers working in Egypt. The Egyptian government agreed, and promised to pay the salaries of the four borrowed lecturers for four years. The U.S. nominated Professor Majid Khadduri to be the dean of Faculty of Literature, and committed to pay his salary.

A royal decree was issued on 15 December 1955 for the founding of the university. The first faculty to be formed was the Faculty of Literature in Benghazi, and the royal palace "Al Manar", from which King Idris I of Libya declared the country's independence on 24 December 1951, was assigned to be the campus.

=== Expansion ===
The next step was of course to extend the university and establish new faculties:

- Faculty of Science, Tripoli, 1956.
- Faculty of Economics, Benghazi, 1957.
- Faculty of Law, Benghazi, 1962.
- Faculty of Agriculture, Tripoli, 1966.
- Faculty of Medicine, Benghazi, 1970.

On 6 October 1968, a celebration was held for the founding of a new campus in Garyounis district of Benghazi. The celebration was attended by King Idris I, Wanis al-Qaddafi, the Prime Minister, and Abdel Moula Dughman, President of the university.

=== Split ===
In August 1973 the university split to form two new universities:

- the Tripoli Campus formed the University of Tripoli; and

After 7 April 1976 the two new universities were renamed as follows:

- the University of Tripoli became Al Fateh University; and
- the University of Benghazi became Garyounis University.

== Presidents ==
A list of presidents of the University of Libya:

- Mahmud El Bishti (1956–1958)
- Abdel Jawad el Freitees (1958–1961)
- Bakry Gaddura (1961–1963)
- Mutapha Bayo (1963–1967)
- Abdel Moula Dughman (1967–1969)
- Omar et Tumi esh Sheibani (1969–1973)

== See also ==
- List of split up universities
