= Mustafa Ben Halim =

Libyan politician and businessman (1921–2021)

- مصطفى أحمد بن حليم
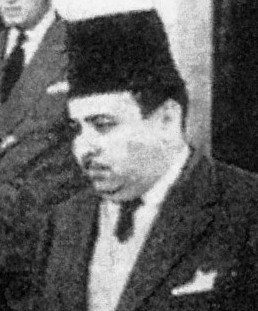
- Ben Halim between 1949 and 1950

Prime Minister of Libya
- In office 12 April 1954 – 25 May 1957
- Monarch: Idris I
- Preceded by: Muhammad Sakizli
- Succeeded by: Abdul Majid Kubar

Foreign Minister of Libya
- In office 3 December 1954 – 30 October 1956
- Prime Minister: Himself
- Preceded by: Abdul Salam al-Buseiri
- Succeeded by: Ali Sahli

Transport Minister of Libya
- In office 18 February 1954 – 19 December 1954
- Prime Minister: Muhammad Sakizli; Himself
- Preceded by: Ibrahim ben Shaaban
- Succeeded by: Ali Sahli

Personal details
- Born: Mustafa Ahmed Ben Halim; 29 January 1921 Alexandria, Egypt
- Died: 7 December 2021 (aged 100) United Arab Emirates
- Spouse: Yusra Kanaan
- Children: 6, including Tarek

Mustafa Ahmed Ben Halim (Arabic: مصطفى احمد بن حليم; 29 January 1921 – 7 December 2021) was a Libyan politician and businessman who served in a number of leadership positions in the Kingdom of Libya from 1953 to 1960. Ben Halim was the Prime Minister of Libya from 12 April 1954 to 25 May 1957. Through his political and private sector work, he supported the development of the modern Libyan state.

== Early life ==
Ben Halim was born in exile in Alexandria, Egypt on 29 January 1921, where his Cyrenaican father sought refuge from the Italian occupation of Libya. He graduated with a B.S. in civil engineering from the Egyptian University of Alexandria in 1943.

== Rise to power ==
As prime minister, Ben Halim prioritized building relationships and alliances with the West, notably Great Britain, the United States, and France. Due to these relationships, Ben Halim was able to secure aid for Libya from Great Britain and the United States at a time of heightened Cold War tensions.

From 1957 to 1958, Ben Halim served as the Private Councillor to King Idris. He was later appointed Libyan Ambassador to France from 1958 to 1960 during which time he helped negotiate the French/Algerian truce between the FLN and the French Government.

Between 1964 and 1968, Ben Halim served as an informal advisor to King Idris on institutional reforms which were proposed during his term as prime minister. Due to ongoing political pressure from special interest groups, the reforms were not fully implemented. In 1969, Ben Halim was on a family holiday in Switzerland when Muammar Gaddafi staged his coup. After Gaddafi took power, Ben Halim was unable to return to Libya.

== Life in exile and return ==
Unable to return to Libya, Ben Halim briefly settled in London where he and his family were granted political asylum. He then moved to Beirut, Lebanon in 1970 to pursue new business ventures, including helping Consolidated Contractors Company negotiate sub-contracting agreements with the Bechtel Corporation, one of the largest civil engineering firms in the world. In 1973 a failed kidnapping attempt by mercenaries hired by Colonel Gaddafi forced him to relocate his family to London. In the years that followed, there were several assassination attempts made on Ben Halim's life which were foiled by British Intelligence.

Ben Halim was granted Saudi nationality in 1975, six years after King Faisal of Saudi Arabia granted the Ben Halim family passports to allow them to travel and conduct business in Lebanon and the United Kingdom. In 1980, he was appointed Personal Councilor to then Crown Prince Fahd bin Abdul Aziz of Saudi Arabia. Ben Halim was the last surviving of the Kingdom of Libya's premiers, and the only one of them who witnessed the fall of Muammar Gaddafi in 2011. After the fall of Gaddafi, Ben Halim returned to Libya after 42 years in exile. His homecoming was warmly received by the Libyan people. His house in Tripoli, which in 1969 was left in the custody of a sentry, was seized by the sentry who then claimed ownership of the property.

== Personal life and death ==
- Ben Halim's eldest son, Amr Ben Halim, is the Founder and a board member of Al Yusr Industrial Contracting Company.
- Tarek Mustafa Ben Halim, founded Alfanar, the Arab region's first venture philanthropy organisation, in 2004, after a career in investment banking.
- Ahmed Ben Halim co-founded The Capital Partnership, an investment management firm, in 1998 following a career in banking and investment industries. He is also the founder and Chairman of Libya Holdings Group, an investment company focused on the development of Libya's energy, infrastructure and financial sectors.
- Sherine Ben Halim Jafar is an author. Her book "Under the Copper Covers", a culinary journey through North Africa and Middle East was published in 2015 by Rimal Publications

He turned 100 on 29 January 2021 and died on 7 December 2021.

== Honours ==
- Knight Grand Cordon of the Order of Idris I

== Literature ==
- Libya: The Years of Hope - The Memoirs of Mustafa Ahmed Ben-Halim - Former Prime Minister of Libya, ISBN 0-9532961-0-5
- "Libya's Hidden Pages of History: A Memoir - صفحات مطوية من تاريخ ليبيا السياسي" Rimal Publications, 2011 (Arabic Edition) ISBN 9789963610761
- "Libya's Hidden Pages of History: A Memoir" Rimal Publications, 2013 (English Edition)
- Dictionary of Modern Arab History, an A-Z of over 2,000 entries from 1798 to the Present Day, by Robin Leonard Bidwell
