= Libyan pound =

Currency of Libya from 1951 to 1971

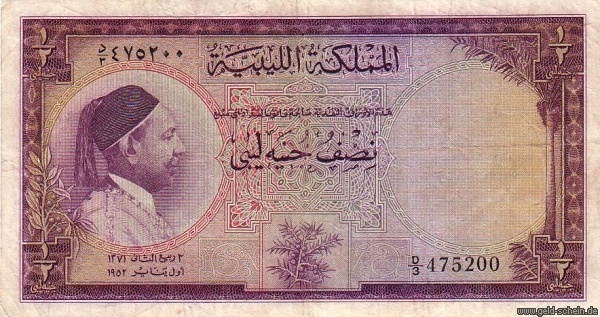
Libyan half pound, with the portrait of King Idris of Libya

The Libyan pound (Arabic جنيه, junieh; sign: £L) was the currency of Libya between 1951 and 1971. It was divided into 100 piastres (قرش, qirsh) and 1000 milliemes (مليم).

== History ==
When Libya was a part of the Ottoman Empire, the country used the Ottoman qirsh, issuing some coins locally until 1844. When Italy took over the country in 1911, the Italian lira was introduced. In 1943, Libya was split into French and British mandate territories. Algerian francs were used in the French mandate, whilst Tripolitanian lira issued by the British military authorities were used in the British mandate.

In 1951, the pound was introduced, replacing the franc and lira at rates of £L1 = 480 lire = 980 francs and was equal in value to one pound sterling. While sterling was devalued in 1967, the Libyan pound did not follow suit, so one Libyan pound became worth £1 3s. 4d. sterling. The Libyan pound was replaced by the dinar at par in 1971 following the Libyan Revolution of 1969.

The Libyan pound was one of the strongest currencies in the world, with £L1=$2.80 USD. This was because of the flourishing economy and the new discovery of oil reserves, although there was a parallel currency exchange market which reflected internal economic conditions.

== Coins ==
Coins were issued in 1952 in denominations of 1, 2, and 5 milliemes, and 1 and 2 piastres. In 1965, a second series of coins was issued in denominations of 1, 5, 10, 20, 50, and 100 milliemes. These coins continued to circulate after 1971 as no new coins were issued until 1975.

== Banknotes ==
In 1951, the government issued notes in denominations of 5 and 10 piastres, £L1/4, £L1/2, £L1, £L5, and £L10. In 1959, the National Bank of Libya took over the issuance of paper money with denominations of £L1/2, £L1, £L5, and £L10. In 1963, the Bank of Libya took over from the National Bank and issued notes in the same denominations.
