= Agricultural Bank of Libya =

Libyan agricultural development bank

Libyan Agricultural Bank
- Type: State-owned
- Industry: Banking
- Founded: 1957
- Headquarters: 52, Omar El Mokhtar Street, Tripoli, Libya
- Products: Agriculture; Loans
- Total assets: US$340 million (in 1995)
- Number of employees: 550 (in 1995)
- Website: http://www.agribank-ly.org/
- Footnotes; Outstanding_loan_balance: US$200 million (1995)

The Libyan Agricultural Bank (Arabic: المصرف الزراعي) is an agricultural development bank operating under special law and owned by the Libyan government. Established in 1957, it provides advice and guidance on agricultural problems, advances loans to agricultural cooperatives, and generally assists in developing Libya’s agricultural community. The Bank operates one city branch from its headquarters in Tripoli and another 27 branches throughout Libya. The Bank is also a member of the Near East-North Africa Regional Agricultural Credit Association (NENARACA) based in Amman, Jordan.

== See also ==
- Agriculture in Libya
- List of banks
- List of banks in Libya
