= Umma Bank =

- Company type: Public
- Industry: Finance
- Founded: 1907
- Headquarters: Tripoli, Libya
- Products: Financial services
- Website: www.umma-bank.com.ly

The Umma bank (Arabic: مصرف الأمة) (Formerly Banco di Roma) was established on 14 April 1907 under agreement between the Government of Italy and the Government of the Turkish Sultan, in the late era of Turkish rule before the invasion of Libya. On 13 November 1911 a "Revolutionary decision" (Libyanization decision) was issued which required the names of all the Commercial banks in Libya to Arabic names. In accordance with the law, it became Umma Bank, instead of Banco di Roma.

On 22 December 1970 the Revolutionary Command issued another law "the Nationalization Decision" which demanded that all the foreign banks shares were nationalized and became completely owned by Libya.

== See also ==
- List of banks in Libya
