= Farhat Bengdara =

Libyan politician and banker (born 1965)

Farhat Omar Bengdara (Arabic: فرحات عمر بن قداره, 27 September 1965 in Benghazi) is a Libyan politician who was the Chairman of the National Oil Corporation. He is a banker who was the governor of the Central Bank of Libya (CBL) until he defected to the anti-Gaddafi side in the course of the Libyan Civil War. He left Libya for Turkey, which had directs flights and no visa requirements, on 21 February, but was formally in office until 6 March, when the government realised he would not return.

In an interview, he said that he had waited to resign from the bank until UN sanctions were formally in place, in the meantime delaying requested transfers of Libyan sovereign funds from EU and US accounts to countries likely to ignore the sanctions. He said that as a result 96% of external Libyan funds were blocked, and that the sanctions were extremely effective and were having a major impact on the regime.

He went on to describe his current role with the National Transitional Council, essentially trying to maintain banking functions in the free zone, and fostering relationships between the NTC and other countries which will allow central banking to be resumed when the conflict is over.

On 16 July, the day after the US recognised the NTC, he gave an interview on behalf of the newly formed association of Libyan bankers, stating that they were collecting data on Libyan foreign resources, and preparing plans for submission to the NTC concerning the restructuring of the Libyan banking sector when the time was right.

Bengdara has a B.A. in economics from Garyounis University in Benghazi, and a Master in Money, Banking and Finance from Sheffield University in the United Kingdom.

Earlier, he acted as Deputy Governor of the CBL; chairman and General Manager for the Public Furniture Company, Libya; and Deputy Chairman of Wahda Bank, Libya. Bengdara has been a Director of Bank ABC since 2001 and has 18 years experience in banking and other business sectors. Deputy Chairman of ABC in Egypt (S.A.E.) and Chairman of ABC International Bank plc, in London. He is also a board member for the Libyan Investment Corporation. Furthermore, Mr. Bengdara has been board member and vice-chairman of UniCredit SpA since 29 April 2009.

The government, based in Tripoli, announced on July 13, 2022, the appointment of a new boss at the head of the National Petroleum Company (NOC) and it is Farhat Bengdara who will be at the head of the company. He resigned on January 16, 2025.

== Notes ==
Government offices
Preceded by Ahmed Menesi	Governor of the Central Bank of Libya; 2006–2011	Succeeded by Abd-al-Hafid Mahmud al-Zulaytini (acting)
