= Libyan Investment Authority =

Sovereign wealth fund of Libya

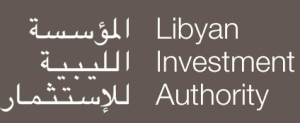
- Type: State-owned
- Industry: Sovereign wealth fund
- Founded: August 28, 2006
- Headquarters: Tripoli, Libya
- Products: Financial Investments, Fund management Oil and gas
- Subsidiaries: Libyan Foreign Investment Company; Oilinvest; Libyan Africa Investment Portfolio; Libyan Internal Investment and Development Fund; Long-Term Investment Portfolio
- Website: lia.ly

The Libyan Investment Authority (LIA; Arabic: المؤسسة الليبية للاستثمار) is a government-managed sovereign wealth fund and holding company headquartered in Tripoli, Libya. It was established on August 28, 2006, by Decree 208 of the General People's Committee of Libya (GPC), after the lifting of economic sanctions that had previously precluded foreign investment in Libya. The LIA oversees and manages investments in various areas including agriculture, real estate, infrastructure, oil and gas and in shares and bonds. It is Africa's largest sovereign wealth fund. The fund is a member of the International Forum of Sovereign Wealth Funds and is therefore signed up to the Santiago Principles on best practice in managing sovereign wealth funds. As of 2019, the date of its last valuation, the fund owns US$68 billion in assets.

== Purpose ==
The LIA was established in August 2006 to manage Libya's mounting oil revenue surplus and is headquartered in Tripoli. The LIA main subsidiaries consist of the Libyan Foreign Investment Company (LAFICO), established in 1982, Oilinvest, founded in 1988, as well as the Libyan Africa Investment Portfolio, the Libyan Internal Investment and Development Fund and the Long-Term Investment Portfolio. The LIA mandate based on Law 13 of 2010 to the board of directors is to preserve, protect and grow the sovereign wealth investments.

== Governance ==
The LIA is overseen by the Libyan Government and is managed within governance processes, accountable to that government.

=== Board of trustees ===
The Board of Trustees of LIA is:

- Mr. Abduhamid Debiba, Chairman – Prime Minister (Government of National unity)
- Mr. Saddek Elkaber, Member – Central Bank Governor
- Member – Minister of Finance
- Member - Minister of Planning
- Minister of Economy and Industry

Previous Chairmen include Ali M Hassen Mohammed, the LIA's current chairman.

=== Steering Committee Members ===
The Steering Committee is composed of five members, including the chairman. The current Steering Committee Members are: The Steering Committee is chaired by Dr. Ali Mahmoud Hassan Mohamed. The other members are Eng. Abdulazeez Khaled Ali, Mr. Alhadi Najimeddin Kabar, Mr. Khaled Khalifa Hassan Altaher and Mr. Ahmed Abdullah Amar.

=== Law No. 13 of 2010 ===
As of 2010 the LIA was embedded within democratic structures of Libya and its mandate was defined by Law 13 which became statute in 2010. Law No. 13 of 2010 sets out the LIA's continuing mandate. The Libyan Investment Authority ("LIA") was established in 2006 and is regulated under Law No. 13 of 2010 ("Law No. 13"), which continues to be in full force and effect as a matter of Libyan law.

Under Law No. 13, the LIA is composed of:

a. The Board of Trustees, being the ultimate governance body with oversight and control of the LIA. The Board of Trustees comprises: the Prime Minister (as Chairman); the ministers for Planning, Finance, Economy and Trade; the Governor of the Central Bank of Libya; and a number of experts. This structure was established by Decree No. 2 of 2014, the Council of Ministers, the executive branch of the Libyan Government appointed in accordance with the governmental mandate of the elected House of Representatives.

b. The Board of Directors, being the competent body to oversee the management of the LIA (articles 10 and 11 of Law No. 13). The LIA Board of Directors is to be made up of seven members, including a chairman. They must be appointed by resolution of the board of trustees. The Board of Directors oversees three subcommittees, (Nomination & Compensation, Governance, and Audit & Risk Committee), each of which have an agreed mandate of responsibilities and undertake frequent reporting back to the board of directors. The Board of Directors frequently report to the board of trustees.

== History of activities ==
=== 2007 ===
On May 29, 2007, during a visit to Muammar Gaddafi by British Prime Minister Tony Blair, British Petroleum (BP) signed a $900 million exploration and production agreement with the Libyan National Oil Corporation. The agreement, which would likely involve an estimated US$2 billion in investment, covered three massive, largely unexplored tracts. The NOC signed the agreement with the LIA as BP's 15% partner in a production sharing agreement (PSA). The LIA's share in BP's PSA provided a direct conduit via which oil wealth could be recycled. However, some Libya experts believed that the presence of two state-owned companies in BP's deal reflected divisions and tensions at the executive level in Libya, particularly over who controls the oil wealth.

During August 2007, LIA agreed to establish a Libyan-Qatari joint investment fund for $2 billion equally with the Qatar Investment Corporation (QIC). Also, the General People's Congress secretary signed two agreements in Doha in July 2007 to establish a Libyan-Qatari Bank between QIC and the Central Bank of Libya. An agreement was also signed to establish a joint company for real estate development between Al-Diar real estate investment company (Qatar) and the Libyan Arab Foreign Investment Company.

=== 2008 ===
In July, 2008, the LIA bought a share in the Dutch-Belgian bank of Fortis, which needed additional funds to maintain solvency. The LIA did not confirm the investment, since they were not required by Dutch or Belgian law to do so. However, later that week, the Dutch Minister of Finance Wouter Bos admitted that the situation 'had his attention, as well as that of the Dutch Central Bank', considering previous Libyan involvement in international terrorism. Between January and June 2008, the LIA paid $1.3 billion for options on a basket of currencies and options on six stocks (Citigroup Inc., UniCredit SpA, Banco Santander, Allianz, Électricité de France and Eni SpA) via Goldman Sachs. By February 2010, the value of these investments was 0.025 billion - a 98% loss.

=== 2010 ===
As of June 2010, Lafico held 7.5% of the total shares of Italian football club Juventus.

=== 2011 ===
In June 2010 and September 2012 Internal Management Reports were leaked to the Press by sacked staff, which showed the Libyan Investment Authority had suffered much smaller losses than expected compared to the huge losses suffered by many sovereign wealth funds during the 2008 financial crisis.

The Financial Times interviewed Gaddafi era appointees and directors of LIA, bankers who had never done business with the LIA, and former Gaddafi Libyan officials and reported more rumour and innuendo with no hard evidence generally making vague claims of mismanagement. Farhat Bengdara, a Gaddafi appointee, the former governor of the Central Bank of Libya and member of LIA's board of trustees claimed that there was a "clear lack of governance at the LIA" surprising since he been on its governance board of trustees until the revolution came. On Bengdara's recommendation Sami Rais (another Gaddafi era appointment)had been made chief executive of LIA in October 2009. Rais and Bengdara were subsequently sacked by the new governments of Libya. The accountancy firm KPMG had provided reports and audit in 2010 which showed the LIA asset position steadily improving and made no suggestions of corruption or wrongdoing by any LIA staff member.

In 2011, Ali Tarhouni, minister of financial and oil affairs for the rebel National Transitional Council, appointed Mahmoud Badi, formerly a civil servant under Gaddafi, to investigate the Libyan Investment Authority. In August 2011, Badi found "misappropriation, misuse and misconduct of funds" with $2.9 billion missing from the LIA. Badi's report was the first in a series of reports by Gaddafi era technocrats claiming large losses and misconduct. Badi himself was a Gaddafi era technocrat and was removed soon after his claims were made. He now heads the Libyan Economic and Social Fund.

=== 2012 ===
As of December 2012, the Libyan Investment Authority following the Deloitte validation and evaluation report and the commitment to meeting the governance of mandate outlined in Law 13, the LIA appeared to be operating normally and no responsible investigation has demonstrated any real substantiated evidence of corruption or malfeasance.

=== 2014 ===
On 29 September 2014 the Board of Trustees removed Mr Ben Yezza from his role (Resolution 7 of 29 September 2014) and appointed Mr Bouhadi as chairman (Resolution 8).

In 2014, Breish stepped down, replaced in the interim by Abdulrahman Ben Yezza, a former Libyan Minister for Oil and Gas, pending an inquiry under Libya's Political and Administrative Isolation Law (through decision No.659 of 2014), until a permanent chairman was put in place. In early 2014, Breish initiated legal proceedings on behalf of the LIA against Goldman Sachs and Société Générale S.A to recover billions of dollars lost through improper transactions done in their dealing with the LIA during the Gaddafi Regime. The LIA appointed the English law firm Enyo Law to pursue litigations. Enyo law was forced to step aside in April 2015 but was re-instated in July 2015 when the English High Court approved the LIA's application to appoint BDO LLP (UK) as interim receivers and Enyo Law were reappointed as solicitors in the litigations.

=== 2015 ===
Approximately 85% of the LIA's assets remain frozen to safeguard them against potential misappropriation and corruption. These sanctions were originally requested by the National Transitional Council shortly after the fall of the Gaddafi regime to protect such assets from theft.

In 2015 Abdulmagid Breish called for the UN to maintain its freeze over the majority of the LIA's assets under UN Security Council Resolution 1970 of 26 February 2011.

Breish insisted that Libyan assets must be frozen until a unity government emerges and asserts control. Bouhadi, by contrast, has repeatedly sought to unfreeze the assets, stating that said he would appeal to the UN, the US and the EU. In December 2015, the UN Security Council unanimously adopted Resolution 2259 welcoming the signing of Libyan Political Agreement and the emergence of a Tripoli-based Presidency Council (PC) and Government of National Accord (GNA).

Breish appealed against his isolation before the Appeal Court of Tripoli. On 13 April 2015, the Libyan Court of Appeal stated that the Political and Administrative Isolation Law did not apply to Breish – he claims this led to his reinstatement as chairman and CEO of the LIA on 18 May 2015. However, this decision did not reinstate him, nor did it suggest that any tenure he may have had in the past be reinstated.

=== 2016 ===
In March 2016, AbdulMagid Breish, former BoD Chairman, disputed Hassan Bouhadi’s authority as chairman of the Board of Directors of the LIA. On 30 March 2016, the Presidency Council and GNA arrived in Tripoli. By mid-April British, French and Spanish ambassadors had returned to Tripoli to reopen their embassies, and foreign ministers from the UK, France and Germany had visited Tripoli to express their support for the PC and GNA. Italian and Spanish ambassadors then followed suit shortly after.

Breish supported the establishment of a Presidency Council (PC) and Government of National Accord (GNA) in April 2016 and welcomed the PC and GNA, stating that "The LIA reaffirms its readiness to fully cooperate with the Government of National Accord in providing all relevant data, reports and support".

On 15 August 2016, the Presidential Council of the Government of National Accord (GNA) appointed an Interim Steering Committee to temporarily administer and steer the LIA. It has the privileges and terms of reference of the board of directors and chairman with a view to safeguard the normal administration of the company.

On 17 August 2016, the governments of France, Germany, Italy, Spain, the United Kingdom, and the United States issued a Joint Statement welcoming the appointment of the Steering Committee and underlining the GNA to "exercise sole and effective oversight" of the Libyan institutions including the LIA.

== Assets ==
The value of the LIA was widely quoted as $70 billion but the LIA's September 2010 management information report valued its own investment portfolio at $64 billion and the Wall Street Journal quoted a value of $53 billion in June 2010.

In May 2011, The Washington Post detailed the holdings of the LIA. Despite a severe lack of transparency, the LIA saw an astonishing influx of foreign investment after Libya was removed from the U.S.'s list of state sponsors of terrorism in 2006, thereby lifting previously imposed economic sanctions. The Post reported that investment in Libya "occurred with encouragement from U.S. officials, who wanted to reward Gaddafi for pledging to honor international law, disavow terrorism and compensate relatives of victims of the Pan Am Flight 103 bombing:"

"Sanctions are powerful because of our ability to leverage the U.S. financial system. Immediate access to the U.S. and Western investment upon the removal of sanctions is the ultimate carrot...That carrot is what compels sanctioned narcotics traffickers, proliferators and supporters of terrorism to change their behavior and stop engaging in the illicit conduct that got them cut off from the United States."

— Unnamed senior U.S. official, The Washington Post, 25 May 2011

As of Q1 of 2010, the LIA held approximately US$56 billion in assets around the world, broken down as follows:

- $22 billion: Cash and deposits, mostly gold reserves in the Central Bank of Libya, with a small amount held by other banks including HSBC and Goldman Sachs.
- $16.8 billion: Subsidiary companies owned by the fund, including Oil Invest.
- $6 billion: Equities in companies including GE, AT&T, Citigroup, and Juventus
- $3.8 billion: Alternatives, including investments with J.P. Morgan, Lehman Brothers and The Carlyle Group.
- $3.2 billion: Bonds, including U.S. Treasuries.
- $4.2 billion: Other assets.

By May 2011, U.S. regulators had frozen $37 billion of the LIA's assets there, including $29 billion in a single bank. The head of the London School of Economics resigned after it was revealed that he had served as an informal adviser to the LIA and accepted a donation from the fund to the school. UniCredit, Italy's largest bank, also froze some of Gaddafi's assets.

Following a validation and evaluation assessment undertaken by Deloitte for the board of directors in 2012, the LIA portfolio was valued at $67 billion as of December 31, 2012.

Per the last valuation of the fund in 2019, the LIA owns assets worth $68.4 billion US dollars.

As of 2025, the LIA holds investments in more than + 450 companies and 200 Estates in Africa, Europe, North America, South America, Asia. The securities distribution of the fund is 30% in shares in companies listed on the main global stock exchanges, 30% of private and government bonds, including money market instruments, and 40% in time deposits and cash deposited with the Central Bank of Libya and in a number of commercial banks.
