= University of Tripoli =

Public university in Tripoli, Libya

University of Tripoli (UOT)
- جامعة طرابلس
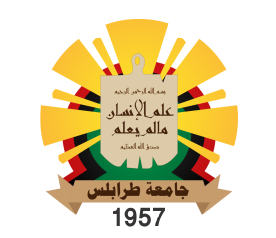
- The Emblem of the University
- Former names: University of Libya (Tripoli Division); Al Fateh University
- Motto: عَلَّمَ الْإِنسَانَ مَا لَمْ يَعْلَمْ (Arabic)
- Motto in English: He has taught man that which he knew not
- Type: Public
- Established: 1957; 69 years ago 1973; 53 years ago (current form )
- Administrative staff: 2,500–2,999
- Students: over 45,000
- Location: Tripoli, Libya; 32.8557519°N 13.2212842°E
- Colors: Blue Sky and Sunglow
- Mascot: Fennec fox
- Website: https://uot.edu.ly

The University of Tripoli (UOT) (Arabic: جامعة طرابلس), is the largest university in Libya and is located in the capital city of Tripoli. It was founded in 1957 as a branch of the University of Libya before it was divided in 1973 to become what is now known as the University of Tripoli.

== Degrees ==
The university provides undergraduate, graduate and postgraduate levels of study and awards the following degrees:

- Intermediate Certificate (Diploma)
- Bachelor's degree
- Licentiate's degree
- Master's degree
- Doctorate degree (PhD)

== Faculties ==
Faculties of the University of Tripoli
- Faculty of Engineering
- Faculty Of Economics and Political Sciences
- Faculty of Agriculture
- Faculty of Education
- Faculty of Information Technology
- Faculty of Sciences
- Faculty of Law
- Faculty of Sport Sciences and Physical Education
- Faculty of Medicine
- Faculty of Veterinary Medicine
- Faculty of Medical Technology
- Faculty of Pharmacy
- Faculty of Languages
- Faculty of Dentistry
- Faculty of Arts
- Faculty of Fine Arts and Media

=== Faculty of Science ===
The Faculty of Science was established in 1957 with ties to the then University of Libya in Faculty of Science in Tripoli founded in 1956. It was the first practical college in Libya at that time, and thus became a focus for Libyan students seeking a university degree. The faculty prepares specialists in fundamental and applied sciences, and performs scientific research and studies in various scientific fields

==== Departments ====
- Department of Chemistry
- Department of Physics
- Department of Mathematics
- Department of Zoology
- Department of Botany
- Department of Geology
- Department of Geophysics
- Department of Atmospheric science
- Department of Statistics
- Department of Computer science

=== Faculty of Agriculture ===
The Faculty of Agriculture was established on 27 June 1966 as a college affiliated with the University of Libya (which had their own faculty founded in 1966) and it was the second faculty established in Tripoli. The main aims of the Faculty of Agriculture include preparing highly qualified agricultural engineers in different specializations, performing agricultural research, and providing consultations and technical services.

==== Departments ====
The academic study started by matriculation of the first class of forty-two students in 1966/1967, split across three scientific departments:

- Department of Agricultural Economics.
- Department of Prevention.
- Department of Crops.
- Department of Soil and Water Sciences.
- Department of Gardening.
- Department of Pastures and Forests.
- Department of Agricultural Engineering.
- Department of Aquaculture.
- Department of Animal Production.
- Department of Food Science.
- Department of Home Economics.

In 1971/1972 the Department of Food Science in the Faculty of Engineering joined the Faculty of Agriculture.

The Department of Plant Production consisted of five branches: agricultural economics, horticulture, field crops, plant protection, and agricultural engineering.

In 1978 these branches changed to become departments and two departments were added to the faculty in the same year (Department of Pasture and Forests and Department of Home Economics). In 1995 the Department of Hydroponics was established at the faculty and the Department of Political Culture was created in 2002 bringing the total number of departments in the faculty to twelve, in addition to the general department that students have a preliminary year before joining specialized scientific departments.

=== Faculty of Engineering ===
It was established as the Faculty of High Technical Studies within the scientific and technical cooperation program with UNESCO. It was the first Engineering faculty established in Libya. In 1967, the faculty joined the University of Libya and was called the Faculty of Engineering. In 1972; the Faculty of Petroleum Engineering was established at the University of Tripoli, joined by the Faculty of Engineering and the Faculty of Science in 1973. The Faculty of Engineering and other faculties were the core of the University of Tripoli. In 1978, the Nuclear and Electronic Engineering Faculty joined the university. In 1985, the Faculty of Petroleum Engineering was merged with Faculty of Engineering according to the policy of connecting faculties and high institutes with engineering research centers. In 1988, the Nuclear and Electronic Engineering Faculty was merged into the Faculty of Engineering.

The Faculty of Engineering has a leading role in its scientific career. In response to this development, the Faculty of Engineering made changes in its academic courses and academic structure. The Faculty of Engineering changed from four departments to fourteen departments to meet the needs and requirements of Libyan society and to achieve its aims and visions.

==== Departments ====
- Department of Computer Engineering.
- Department of Civil Engineering.
- Department of Mechanical and Industrial Engineering.
  - Division of Power
  - Division of Industrial
  - Division of Applied
- Department of Electrical and Electronic Engineering.
  - Division of Power
  - Division of Control
  - Division of Telecommunication
- Department of Architecture and Urban Planning.
- Department of Marine Engineering and Naval Architecture.
- Department of Chemical Engineering.
- Department of Geological Engineering.
- Department of Petroleum Engineering.
- Department of Mining Engineering.
- Department of Aeronautical Engineering.
- Department of Nuclear Engineering.
- Department of Materials and Metals Engineering.
- Department of Engineering Management. (Graduate)

=== Faculty of Information Technology ===
==== Departments ====
- Department of General Subjects.
- Department of Software Engineering.
- Department of Computer Science.
- Department of Computer Networks.
- Department of Mobile Computing.
- Department of Web Technology.
- Department of Information Systems.

=== Faculty of Pharmacy ===
==== Departments ====
- Department of Biochemistry
- Department of Medicinal Chemistry
- Department of Phytochemistry
- Department of Pharmaceutical industry
- Department of pharmacology
- Department of Pharmaceutics
- Department of Microbiology

=== Faculty of Veterinary Medicine ===
The Faculty of Veterinary Medicine was established in 1975. The faculty is a scientific organization that graduates veterinarians able to participate in solving problems of animal health, preventive medicine, animal production, and food control. The Faculty of Veterinary Medicine is a research institution to understand and finding solutions for many problems face the society in the field of animal health, introducing new techniques in diagnosis, medication, production, in addition to research in basic applied sciences.

==== Campus of the Faculty ====
- Administration Ward: includes people's committee of the faculty, offices of secretaries of scientific departments, and faculty offices.
- Second Ward: includes lecture halls, classes, cafeteria, and library
- Third Ward: includes labs of faculty.
- Fourth Ward: includes laboratories. In addition to anatomy hall, ray rooms, surgical operations theaters, and samples cooling rooms.

==== Departments ====
- Department of Anatomy and Tissues.
- Department of Physiology and Biochemistry.
- Department of Micro-organisms and Parasites.
- Department of Disease and Diagnostic Laboratory.
- Department of Pharmacology, Forensic Medicine and Toxicology.
- Department of Preventive Medicine.
- Department of Health Surveillance on Food.
- Department of Internal Medicine.
- Department of Diseases of Poultry and Fish.
- Department of Surgery and Reproduction.
- Department of People Ideology.

=== Faculty of Fine Arts and Media ===
The authorities issued a decree in 1985 regarding the establishment of the center of fine and applied arts. Later the center was developed to become the Faculty of Fine Arts and Media.

==== Departments ====
- Department of Fine and Applied Arts.
  - Division of Interior Design.
  - Division of Advertised and Decorative Design.
  - Division of Drawing and Painting.
  - Division of Art Education.
  - Division of Ceramic Art.
  - Division of Sculpture.
  - Division of Engraving and Printing.
- Department of Media.
  - Division of Public Relations.
  - Division of Press.
  - Division of Broadcasting.
- Department of Visual Arts.
  - Division of Photography and Montage.
  - Division of Scenario and Output.
  - Division of Cinema.
  - Division of Animation.
- Department of Theater.
  - Division of Monetary and Authoring.
  - Division of Acting and Directing.
  - Division of Display Technologies.
- Department of Music.
  - Division of Music Education.
  - Division of Instrument Playing.
  - Division of Sound Engineering.

=== Faculty of Physical Education ===
This was established in 1979.

==== Departments ====
- Department of Physical Education (Teaching).
- Department of Training.
- Department of Rehabilitation.

=== Faculty of Law ===
The Faculty of Law was established in the mid-1980s. The faculty was started as the Department of Humane Studies center of the Al-Fateh University, and then in 1994 the decree of general people's committee was issued to establish the Faculty of Law as a separate faculty. The aim of establishment represented in constitution and preparation of legal experiences that society need to in the field of legal profession (legislation, judgment, and jurisprudence) and provide legal consults in different authorities of Libya.

==== Departments ====
- Department of Public Law.
- Department of Private Law.
- Department of Criminal Law.
- Department of Islamic Law (Sharia).
- Department of General Subjects.

=== Faculty of Education ===
The Faculty of Education is a continuation of high institution of teachers with its scientific educational departments to meet the needs of society from scientific and educational qualified teachers in accordance with integrated academic program as follows:

Study at faculty is by year system (four years) to academic year 2007/2008; then the study changed to academic class from 2008/2009; as the study period depends on what the student has fulfilled of courses as requirements for graduation, then the student grants the bachelor's degree of science and education or bachelor's degree of arts and education. All branches of specialized high schools are accepted in the faculty.

==== Departments ====
- Department of Arabic Language.
- Department of Classroom Teacher.
- Department of English Language.
- Department of Special Education.
- Department of Kindergarten.
- Department of Physics.
- Department of Chemistry.
- Department of Biology.
- Department of Math.
- Department of Computer.
- Department of Art and Music Education.

=== Faculty of Medicine ===
Faculty of Medicine was initially planned as part of the main university, but was given more autonomy and a separate administration. It is still geographically adjacent to the main campus in southeast Tripoli. The main teaching hospital is the large Tripoli Medical Center known locally as the TMC. Other teaching facilities are Tripoli Central Hospital, Alkhadra Hospital and Tripoli Children Hospital (Aljala Hospital).

After the completion of six academic years of Undergraduate Education, all Medical Graduates are awarded the degrees MBBCh (Bachelor of Medicine, Bachelor of Surgery).

After seeing that Libyans were going abroad for medical treatment and deciding it was because of a lack of Libyan doctors, the late leader Muammar Gaddafi ordered the medical school to take 2,000 new students regardless of qualifications, well beyond its 150-student capacity.

==== Departments ====
- First And Second Year.
  - Department of Anatomy.
  - Department of Histology And Genetics.
  - Department of Physiology.
  - Department of Biochemistry.
- Third Year.
  - Department of Pathology.
  - Department of Pharmacology.
  - Department of Microbiology.
  - Department of Parasitology.
- Fourth year.
  - Department of Obstetrics and Gynecology.
  - Department of Ophthalmology.
  - Department of Community Medicine.
  - Department of Forensic medicine.
- Fifth Year.
  - Department of Medicine.
  - Department of Surgery.
  - Department of Pediatrics.

=== Faculty of Languages ===
==== Departments ====
- Department of Translation.
- Department of Arabic Language.
- Department of English Language.
- Department of Italian Language.
- Department of French Language.
- Department of Spanish Language.

=== Faculty Of Economics and Political Sciences ===
==== Departments ====
- Department of Economics.
- Department of Management.
- Department of Accountancy.
- Department of Statistics.
- Department of Political Science.
- Department of Banking and Finance.
- Department of Financial Planning.
- Department of Marketing and E-Commerce.

== History ==
The first college of what became University of Tripoli was founded in 1957 as the Faculty of Sciences of University of Libya. In 1966 the Faculty of Agriculture was added, and in 1972 the College of Petroleum and Minerals.

In 1973, the University of Libya was split into two independent universities. All the colleges (faculties) located in Tripoli joined the new University of Tripoli while those located in Benghazi joined the new University of Benghazi (later renamed Garyounis University).

In 1976 the University of Tripoli was renamed Al Fateh University after the student unrest in April, 1976, where pro-government students chanted Al Fateh.

The university was the site of a student uprising by the Students' Union (SU) during the August 2011 Battle of Tripoli, part of the 2011 Libyan Civil War. In 2012, the university was renamed from al-Fateh University to the original name of University of Tripoli.

== Political importance ==
After the 1969 coup by Gaddafi, Tripoli and Benghazi universities were subjected to a crackdown by the Gaddafi government. From the early 1970s political activity was severely curtailed and by the late 1970s, Gaddafi instructed his followers to arrest any students or staff members who were vocally resistant to his government. Each year until the Gaddafi government downfall in 2011, his close followers used to celebrate the commemoration of these events on the 7th of April.

== Notable alumni ==
- Ibrahim Dabbashi, Libya's Permanent Representative to the United Nations
- Abdurrahim El-Keib, served as interim Prime Minister of Libya from 24 November 2011 to 14 November 2012
- Mustafa A.G. Abushagur, served as interim Deputy Prime Minister of Libya from 22 November 2011 to 14 November 2012 in Abdurrahim El-Keib’s cabinet
- Slim Riahi, Tunisian businessman and politician. The founder and leader of the Free Patriotic Union (UPL).
- Saif Al-Islam Gaddafi, son of late leader Muammar Gaddafi, who was an engineer and diplomat.
- Naji Mohamed Issa Belqasem, governor of the Central Bank of Libya

== See also ==
- List of split up universities
