= Libyan Foreign Bank =

Libyan Foreign Bank المصرف الليبي الخارجي
- Company type: Public Company
- Industry: Finance
- Founded: 1972
- Headquarters: Tripoli Dat El Imad Administrative Complex, Libya
- Key people: Muhammad Ali Al-Darrat (Chairman), KHALED AMRO ALGONSEL (General Manager)
- Services: Financial services
- Revenue: ▲USDUnknown
- Parent: Central Bank of Libya
- Subsidiaries: British Arab Commercial Bank (BABC), Banque commerciale du Niger
- Website: www.lfb.ly / www.lafbank.ly

Libyan Foreign Bank (LFB) was established in 1972 in Tripoli, Libya as Libyan Arab Foreign Bank; it was renamed Libyan Foreign Bank in 2005. It was Libya's first offshore banking institution licensed to operate internationally. The Central Bank of Libya owns 100% of LFB. The head office is located in Libya's capital Tripoli.

Since 2010, the bank owns 84% of British Arab Commercial Bank, and 68% of Banca UBAE (Est. 1972) in Rome. (Note: The other foreign banks with an ownership interest in Banca UBAE (Unione delle Banche Arabe ed Europee) are Banque Centrale Populaire (56%) and Banque Marocaine du Commerce Extérieur (4%), both of which are based in Casablanca, (Morocco). Italy is represented by some of the major domestic banking groups – UniCredit (11%), Intesa Sanpaolo (2%) – in addition to three industrial and non-industrial corporations – ENI Group (through Eni Adfin, 59%), Telecom Italia (2%) and Sansedoni Siena (4%).)On 12 March 2011, the Bank of Italy placed Banca UBAE under special administration following the European Council's decision to freeze Libyan banking assets. The intent was to ensure that the bank could continue to operate normally, and in conformity with international policies.

== Operations ==
LFB provides services and operations to facilitate international trade, money flows for investment and payment, and loans to government and official institutions as well as to the private sectors. Its international services comprise insurance and confirmation of letters of credit, creation of acceptance credits, and supply of foreign exchange. In its 2007 ranking of Africa's Top 100 Banks, the magazine African Business placed LAFB at number ten for Africa as a whole and fourth in the North Africa region. They went on to say that the ranking of the Libyan Foreign Bank may actually be understated, given that the most up-to-date figures available for the bank were two years older than those of many of its North African rivals. It offers corporate banking services like offering short, medium, syndicate and long-term loans.

Alubaf International Bank is a subsidiary. Its Tunisia branch was named in three rounds of U.S. sanctions.

== Financial overview ==
As of 2004, the bank had current assets worth 7,200 million Libyan dinars and non-current assets worth 4,746 million Libyan dinars. The current liabilities of the bank were 8,107 million Libyan dinars, while the non-current liabilities were 3,425 million Libyan dinars. The share capital reserve stood at 416 million Libyan dinars. The bank had many Arab banks like Arab International Bank Cairo, Arab Libyan Tunisian Bank as its subsidiary or associated companies.

== See also ==
- List of banks in Libya
