= Central Bank of Libya =

State-owned bank in Libya

Central Bank of Libya مصرف ليبيا المركزي

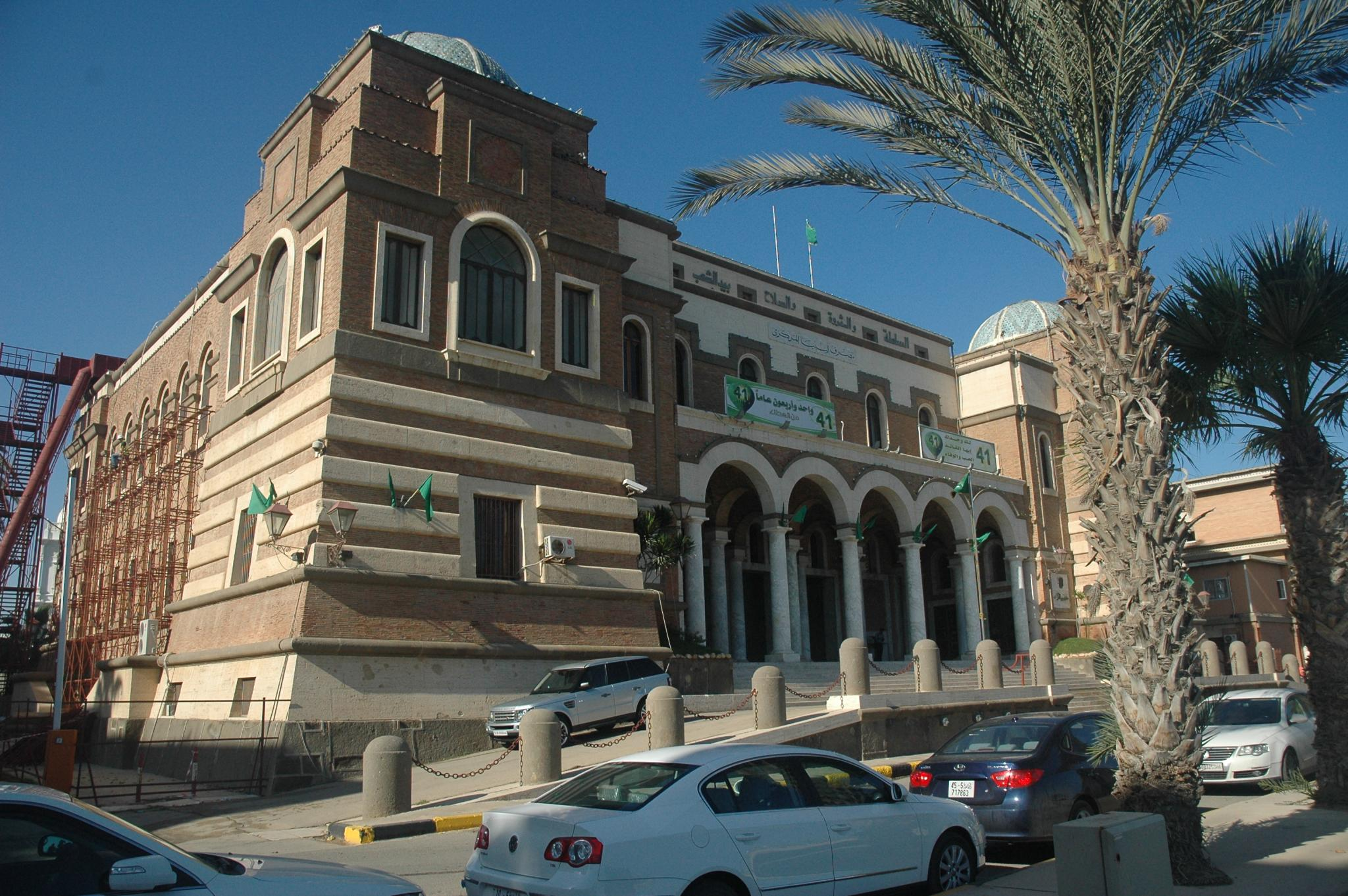
- Central bank of: Libya
- Headquarters: Al Fatah Street, Tripoli
- Established: 1 April 1956; 70 years ago (started operations)
- Ownership: 100% state ownership
- Governor: Fawzi Boukhzam
- Currency: Libyan dinar LYD (ISO 4217)
- Reserves: 7,101 million USD
- Preceded by: Libyan Currency Committee
- Website: cbl.gov.ly Tripoli, Libya centralbankoflibya.org Al-Bayda

The Central Bank of Libya (CBL) is the monetary authority in Libya. It has the status of an autonomous corporate body. The law establishing the CBL stipulates that the objectives of the central bank shall be to maintain monetary stability in Libya and to promote the sustained growth of the economy in accordance with the general economic policy of the state.

The headquarters of the Central Bank are in Tripoli. However, to make the CBL services more accessible to commercial banks, branches and public departments located far from the headquarters. The CBL has three branches, located in Benghazi, Sabha and Sirte.

== History ==
The CBL was founded in 1955 under Act no. 30 (1955) started its operations on 1 April 1956 under the name of National Bank of Libya, to replace the Libyan Currency Commission which was established by the United Nations and other supervising countries in 1951 to ensure the well-being of the weak and poor Libyan economy.

The bank was established in the former Savings Bank building (Italian: Cassa di Risparmio della Tripolitania), designed in 1921 by Armando Brasini and completed in the early 1930s.

The Bank's name was changed to Bank of Libya under Act no. 4 (1963), then to its current name Central Bank of Libya after the 1969 coup d'état.

In March 2011, the governor of CBL, Farhat Bengdara, resigned and defected to the rebelling side of the Libyan Civil War, having first arranged for the bulk of external Libyan assets to be frozen and unavailable to the Gaddafi government.

On 6 December 2021, Tripoli-based Governor of the CBL Sadiq al-Kabir met with Bayda-based CBL governor, Ali Al-Hibri, who before the split had been Elkaber's Deputy Governor, in Tunisia and agreed to start unification of the CBL. On 20 January 2022, Elkaber and Al-Hibri signed an agreement on a four-stage unification plan, with the appointment of Deloitte to oversee the process. On 20 August 2023, the bank officially announced the completion of its reunification under Elkaber and his deputy in the east, Maree Raheel.

On 30 August 2024, the Tripoli-based Government of National Unity sent armed militants to remove CBL governor Sadiq al-Kabir from his office, accusing him of "mishandling oil revenues". Sadiq al-Kabir said that he had been forced to flee Libya to escape threats from armed militants, and called Abdul Hamid Dbeibah's attempt to replace him illegal, as it breached United Nations negotiated accords regarding control over the bank. In response, the Benghazi-based Government of National Stability closed down all oil fields, facilities, and terminals in protest.

== Governors ==
This is a list of governors of the Central Bank of Libya since its establishment. The Bank saw its administration split twice, first during the first civil war, (February–August 2011), then from September 2014 on, as a result of the second civil war.

Name	tenure start	tenure end	Notes
Ali Aneizi	26 April 1955	26 March 1961	
Khalil Bennani	27 March 1961	1 September 1969	
Kassem Sherlala	20 September 1969	17 January 1981	
Rajab El Misallati	18 January 1981	3 March 1986	
Muhammad az-Zaruq Rajab	4 January 1987	6 October 1990	
Abd-al-Hafid Mahmud al-Zulaytini	7 October 1990	13 February 1996	
Taher Al-Jehaimi	14 February 1996	22 March 2001	
Ahmed Menesi	23 March 2001	5 March 2006	
Farhat Bengdara	6 March 2006	6 March 2011	
Abd-al-Hafid Mahmud al-Zulaytini	6 March 2011	2 April 2011	acting
Muhammad az-Zaruq Rajab	2 April 2011	August 2011	
Ahmed S. El Sharif	February 2011	April 2011	for the NTC (in Benghazi)
Kassem Azzuz	April 2011	12 October 2011	for the NTC (in Benghazi to Aug. 2011)
Sadiq al-Kabir	12 October 2011	18 August 2024	for the GNC, later PC since Sep. 2014
Mohamed Shukri	18 August 2024	26 August 2024	appointed by the PC
Abdel Fattah Ghafar	26 August 2024	3 October 2024	appointed by the PC as acting governor
Naji Mohamed Issa Belqasem	3 October 2024	22 October 2026	
Fawzi Boukhzam	22 October 2026	Incumbent	

== See also ==
- Libyan dinar
- List of banks in Libya
- List of central banks
- List of central banks of Africa
- Ministry of Finance (Libya)
- Payment system
- Real-time gross settlement
