= Elections in Libya =

On 7 July 2012, the National Transitional Council, in power since the Libyan Civil War, supervised democratic elections for a 200-member General National Congress to replace the Council. The assembly was to choose a prime minister and organize parliamentary elections in 2013. A process to write a constitution was also to be determined. Unrest driven by armed militias, ethnic minority and radical groups undermined the process and the government for the years following the overthrow of Muammar Gaddafi. While internal apathy towards democratic reforms slowed the process, external bodies such as the European Union were still pressing for the establishment of a national dialogue to build consensus for the drafting of a new constitution to take place before the end of 2014. Parliamentary elections were scheduled to be held on 25 June 2014 in a move aimed at stabilizing the country and quelling the unrest.

== History ==
=== Kingdom of Libya ===
- 1952 Libyan general election
- 1956 Libyan general election
- 1960 Libyan general election
- 1964 Libyan general election
- 1965 Libyan general election

=== Libya under Gaddafi ===
National elections were indirect through a hierarchy of people's committees. The head of government was elected by the General People's Congress. The last such election was held in March 2009, for a three-years term.

Libya's parliament consisted of a unicameral General People's Congress. Its members were elected indirectly through a hierarchy of people's committees.

Suffrage was 18 years of age; universal and technically compulsory.

== Electoral bodies ==
According to Article 157 of the 2017 draft Libyan constitution, the Libyan High National Election Commission (HNEC) is responsible for organising elections of national political bodies in Libya.

The Central Commission of Municipal Council Elections (CCMCE) was created in 2018 for organising municipal elections in 2018 to replace councils elected in 2014. It started holding these elections in 2019 in March and April.

== 2012 elections ==
Party	Party list			Constituency			Total seats
Party	Votes	%	Seats	Votes	%	Seats	Total seats
National Forces Alliance	714,769	48.14	39				39
Justice and Construction Party	152,441	10.27	17				17
Union for Homeland	66,772	4.50	2				2
National Front Party	60,586	4.08	3				3
National Centrist Party	59,402	4.00	2				2
Homeland Party	51,292	3.45	0				0
Homeland for Development and Prosperity	23,629	1.59	1				1
Authenticity and Innovation Combine	18,745	1.26	1				1
Al-Hekma (Wisdom) Party	17,129	1.15	1				1
Libyan Youth	16,119	1.09	0				0
The Middle Nation Gathers	15,354	1.03	1				1
Authenticity and Progress come Together	13,679	0.92	1				1
Libyan National Democratic Party	13,092	0.88	1				1
National Parties Alliance	12,735	0.86	1				1
National Democratic Rally Party for Justice and Progress	12,147	0.82	0				0
People's Party	11,917	0.80	0				0
Ar-Resalah (The Message)	7,860	0.53	1				1
Libya Unites as One Nation	7,853	0.53	0				0
Centrist Youth Party	7,319	0.49	1				1
Wadi Al-Hayah Party for Democracy and Development	6,947	0.47	2				2
Democratic Youth Alliance Party	6,476	0.44	0				0
Libya Success	6,391	0.43	0				0
Libya – The Hope	6,093	0.41	1				1
Free National Congress	5,901	0.40	0				0
Authenticity and Development Association	5,250	0.35	0				0
Nafusa Mountains Gathering	5,226	0.35	0				0
Authenticity and Construction	4,818	0.32	0				0
Democratic Party for the Rule of Law	4,769	0.32	0				0
National Movement for Justice and Development	4,713	0.32	0				0
Renaissance and Development Entity	4,629	0.31	0				0
Authenticity and Justice Alliance	4,604	0.31	0				0
National Congress Association	4,452	0.30	0				0
National Rally Party	4,409	0.30	0				0
Independent National Rally	4,276	0.29	0				0
Brotherhood Party for Justice and Development	4,161	0.28	0				0
Libyan Accord Party	3,926	0.26	0				0
National Democratic Alliance	3,707	0.25	0				0
National Democratic Consensus Party	3,686	0.25	0				0
Labaika National Party	3,472	0.23	1				1
Progress for Libya	3,319	0.22	0				0
Tripoli Gathering	3,103	0.21	0				0
Libyan Unity Gathering	3,053	0.21	0				0
The Center Party for Development and Security	3,039	0.20	0				0
Libyan Party for Liberty and Development	2,691	0.18	1				1
Libyan Development Party	2,649	0.18	0				0
Change and Construction Party	2,570	0.17	0				0
Libya, the Civilization	2,253	0.15	0				0
Renaissance	2,227	0.15	0				0
Entity, Homeland, Freedom, Justice	2,156	0.15	0				0
National Democratic Movement	2,146	0.14	0				0
The Center Gathering for Democracy, Justice and Development	2,094	0.14	0				0
Dawa and Development Party	2,072	0.14	0				0
National Current Gathering	2,062	0.14	0				0
National Communication	1,887	0.13	0				0
The Transition from Revolution to State	1,810	0.12	0				0
Free Libyans Party	1,781	0.12	0				0
Libya for All	1,611	0.11	0				0
Development for the Future	1,596	0.11	0				0
Justice, Reform and Development Alliance	1,586	0.11	0				0
Conservative Independence Party	1,555	0.10	0				0
Promise (National Rally for Justice and Democracy)	1,546	0.10	0				0
Arrakeeza (The Foundation)	1,525	0.10	1				1
Loyalists Party	1,498	0.10	0				0
Al-Wafa Foundation for Martyrs	1,496	0.10	0				0
Al-Kadwa Political Forum	1,450	0.10	0				0
Democratic Development and Prosperity Party	1,420	0.10	0				0
Nation and Prosperity	1,400	0.09	1				1
Virtue Gathering	1,363	0.09	0				0
National Constitutional Rally	1,355	0.09	0				0
National Party of Wadi ash-Shati'	1,355	0.09	1				1
Libyan Democratic Rally Party	1,334	0.09	0				0
Libyan Youth Movement	1,332	0.09	0				0
Libya Al Watan Party	1,324	0.09	0				0
Libyan Rally Party	1,320	0.09	0				0
Peace and development	1,255	0.08	0				0
National Reform Gathering	1,237	0.08	0				0
Libya Union Gathering	1,235	0.08	0				0
Al-Wefaq and Development Party	1,230	0.08	0				0
Libyan Organization for National Unity	1,213	0.08	0				0
National Vision	1,186	0.08	0				0
Coalition to Encourage Women's and Youth Participation in Decision-Making	1,106	0.07	0				0
National Youth Assembly	1,093	0.07	0				0
Libya Renaissance Movement	1,076	0.07	0				0
Democratic Center Party	1,058	0.07	0				0
Libyan Youth Political Bloc	1,044	0.07	0				0
Independent National Gathering - Tarhuna	1,038	0.07	0				0
National Loyalty Party	996	0.07	0				0
National Bloc for Change and Reform	982	0.07	0				0
Freedom and justice	955	0.06	0				0
Sharia current	952	0.06	0				0
Liberation Party for Justice and Development	926	0.06	0				0
Justice and progress	891	0.06	0				0
Libyan National Free Assembly	872	0.06	0				0
Labour Party	825	0.06	0				0
White Hands Coalition	798	0.05	0				0
Libya Unites in Purpose and Destiny	788	0.05	0				0
Umma Party	762	0.05	0				0
The Future	758	0.05	0				0
Wadi Al-Rimal Development and Change Group	706	0.05	0				0
Libya's Hopes	679	0.05	0				0
National Rally for Solidarity and Development	665	0.04	0				0
Libyan Solidarity Gathering	659	0.04	0				0
Afaq Association for Women and Child Care	655	0.04	0				0
Renewal Gathering	637	0.04	0				0
Our Youth	572	0.04	0				0
National Authenticity Forum	518	0.03	0				0
Moderate Democratic Gathering	488	0.03	0				0
Democratic Social Reform Gathering	458	0.03	0				0
United Libya Gathering	429	0.03	0				0
Homeland Alliance Coalition	414	0.03	0				0
Advancement and Renewal	411	0.03	0				0
National Youth Gathering	401	0.03	0				0
Development Party	400	0.03	0				0
National Accord Party	377	0.03	0				0
Libyan Spring	363	0.02	0				0
New National Congress list	345	0.02	0				0
Future Vision Forum	331	0.02	0				0
Democratic Competence Party	323	0.02	0				0
Libyan Republican Party	321	0.02	0				0
Youth Voice Gathering	314	0.02	0				0
Libyan Club for Politics and Development	312	0.02	0				0
Libya, the Beating Heart	289	0.02	0				0
Free Democratic Bloc	282	0.02	0				0
Internal National Forces	272	0.02	0				0
Libyan Party	268	0.02	0				0
Homeland Belt Gathering	254	0.02	0				0
United Libya Centrist Party	177	0.01	0				0
National Party of Libyan Youth	165	0.01	0				0
Liberal Party	112	0.01	0				0
The Libya we Want	105	0.01	0				0
Independent						120	120
Total	1,484,702	100.00	80			120	200

== 2014 elections ==
=== Constituent Assembly ===
HNEC organised the 2014 Libyan Constitutional Assembly election of 60 representatives in February 2014.

=== House of Representatives ===
The Libyan election commission on 20 May 2014 announced elections would be held on 25 June 2014.

== Municipal elections ==
Local elections were held in Libya during 2019–2021, organised by CCMCE, and during 2024–2025 by HNEC.

== National-level election rule disputes ==
Presidential and parliamentary elections in Libya were scheduled for 24 December 2021. These were indefinitely postponed by the High National Elections Commission, due to failure to agree on the electoral rules.

As of 2023, Libya had two competing governments, the Government of National Unity (GNU) sited in Tripoli and the Government of National Stability (GNS) in Sirte, formed in March 2022, and supported by the House of Representatives (HoR). The High Council of State (HCS) is now essentially the legislative body for the GNU. In March 2023 both legislative bodies passed an amendment to the Libyan Constitution providing a broad framework for elections; however, numerous disagreements still exist about implementation.

In November 2023, despite objections from members of the High Council of State and the reservations expressed by United Nations Support Mission in Libya (UNSMIL), the House of Representatives ordered the official publication of election rules in the Official Gazette. The regulations were developed by the 6+6 Committee of the HoR and the HCS.

In late 2025, a citizens' assembly type process among a diverse group of 137 Libyans, called the Structured Dialogue, was launched, with aims including the development of proposals for electoral processes.

== See also ==
- Democracy in the Middle East and North Africa
