= 2014 national electoral calendar =

National and federal elections held in 2014

- Countries with national elections or referendums: Executive Legislative Executive and Legislative Referendum Executive and Referendum Legislative and Referendum Executive, Legislative and Referendum Legislative and Judicial Executive, Legislative, Judicial and Referendum Constitutional Assembly and Legislative

This national electoral calendar for 2014 lists the national/federal elections held in 2014 in all sovereign states and their dependent territories. By-elections are excluded, though national referendums are included.

== January ==
- 5 January: Bangladesh, Parliament
- 14–15 January: Egypt, Constitutional Referendum
- 23 January: Tokelau, Legislature

== February ==
- 2 February:
  - Costa Rica, President and Parliament
  - El Salvador, President (1st round)
  - Thailand, ~~House of Representatives~~ (election nullified)
- 9 February: Switzerland, Referendums
- 20 February: Libya, Constitutional Assembly

== March ==
- 2 March: Thailand, ~~House of Representatives (revote in 69 constituencies)~~ (election nullified)
- 9 March:
  - Colombia, House of Representatives and Senate
  - El Salvador, President (2nd round)
  - North Korea, Parliament
- 15 March: Slovakia, President (1st round)
- 16 March:
  - Crimea, Russian Annexation Referendum
  - Serbia, Parliament
- 22 March: Maldives, Parliament
- 29 March: Slovakia, President (2nd round)
- 30 March: Thailand, Senate

== April ==
- 5 April: Afghanistan, President (1st round)
- 6 April:
  - Costa Rica, President (2nd round)
  - Hungary, Parliament
- 7 April: India, House of the People (1st phase)
- 9 April:
  - India, House of the People (2nd phase)
  - Indonesia, House of Representatives and Senate
- 10 April: India, House of the People (3rd phase)
- 12 April:
  - India, House of the People (4th phase)
  - Niue, Legislature
- 13 April:
  - Guinea-Bissau, President (1st round) and Parliament
  - Republic of Macedonia, President (1st round)
- 17 April:
  - Algeria, President
  - India, House of the People (5th phase)
- 24 April: India, House of the People (6th phase)
- 27 April: Republic of Macedonia, President (2nd round) and Parliament
- 30 April:
  - India, House of the People (7th phase)
  - Iraq, Parliament

== May ==
- 4 May: Panama, President and Parliament
- 7 May:
  - India, House of the People (8th phase)
  - South Africa, National Assembly
- 11 May:
  - Donetsk People's Republic, Independence Referendum
  - Lithuania, President (1st round)
  - Luhansk People's Republic, Independence Referendum
  - New Caledonia, Legislature
- 12 May: India, House of the People (9th phase)
- 18 May:
  - Guinea-Bissau, President (2nd round)
  - Switzerland, Referendums
- 20 May: Malawi, President and Parliament
- 25 May:
  - Belgium, Chamber of Representatives
  - Colombia, President (1st round)
  - Denmark, Referendum
  - Lithuania, President (2nd round)
  - San Marino, Referendums
  - Ukraine, President
- 26–28 May: Egypt, President

== June ==
- 3 June: Syria, President
- 8 June:
  - Kosovo, Parliament
  - Slovenia, Referendum
  - South Ossetia, Parliament
- 12 June: Antigua and Barbuda, Parliament
- 14 June: Afghanistan, President (2nd round)
- 15 June:
  - Colombia, President (2nd round)
  - Liechtenstein, Referendum
- 21 June: Mauritania, President
- 25 June: Libya, ~~Parliament~~ (election nullified)
- 29 June:
  - Lithuania, Constitutional Referendum
  - North Cyprus, Constitutional Referendum

== July ==
- 9 July:
  - Cook Islands, Legislature
  - Indonesia, President
- 13 July: Slovenia, National Assembly

== August ==
- 10 August: Turkey, President
- 24 August: Abkhazia, President
- 29 August: Sint Maarten, Legislature

== September ==
- 11 September: Montserrat, Legislature
- 14 September: Sweden, Parliament
- 17 September: Fiji, Parliament
- 20 September: New Zealand, Parliament
- 28 September: Switzerland, Referendums

== October ==
- 4 October: Latvia, Parliament
- 5 October:
  - Brazil, President (1st round), Chamber of Deputies and Senate
  - Bulgaria, Parliament
- 10–11 October: Czech Republic, Senate (1st round)
- 12 October:
  - Bolivia, President, Chamber of Deputies and Senate
  - Bosnia and Herzegovina, Presidency and House of Representatives
  - São Tomé and Príncipe, Parliament
- 15 October:
  - Jersey, Referendum
  - Mozambique, President and Parliament
- 17–18 October: Czech Republic, Senate (2nd round)
- 24 October: Botswana, Parliament
- 26 October:
  - Brazil, President (2nd round)
  - Tunisia, Parliament
  - Ukraine, Parliament
  - Uruguay, President (1st round), Chamber of Deputies, Senate and Constitutional Referendum

== November ==
- 2 November:
  - Donetsk People's Republic, Head and Parliament
  - Luhansk People's Republic, Head and Parliament
  - Romania, President (1st round)
- 4 November: United States, House of Representatives and Senate
- 16 November: Romania, President (2nd round)
- 19 November: Solomon Islands, Parliament
- 22 November: Bahrain, Council of Representatives (1st round)
- 23 November: Tunisia, President (1st round)
- 27 November: Tonga, Parliament
- 28 November: Greenland, Legislature
- 29 November:
  - Bahrain, Council of Representatives (2nd round)
  - Namibia, President and National Assembly
- 30 November:
  - Moldova, Parliament
  - Switzerland, Referendums
  - Uruguay, President (2nd round)

== December ==
- 8 December: Dominica, Parliament
- 10 December: Mauritius, Parliament
- 14 December: Japan, House of Representatives and Supreme Court retention elections
- 20 December: Liberia, Senate
- 21 December:
  - Tunisia, President (2nd round)
  - Uzbekistan, Legislative Chamber (1st round)
- 28 December: Croatia, President (1st round)

== Indirect elections ==
The following indirect elections of heads of state and the upper houses of bicameral legislatures took place through votes in elected lower houses, unicameral legislatures, or electoral colleges:

- 7 February, 26 June, and 20 November: India, Council of States
- 1 April:
  - Malta, President
  - San Marino, Captains Regent
- 23 April 2014 – 31 October 2016: Lebanon, President (16 rounds in 2014)
- 21 May: South Africa, President
- 25 May: Belgium, Senate
- 10 June: Israel, President
- 24 July: Iraq, President
- 31 August: Macau, Chief Executive
- 17–22 September: Vanuatu, President
- 28 September: France, Senate
- 1 October:
  - Kazakhstan, Senate
  - San Marino, Captains Regent
- 12 October: Republic of the Congo, Senate
- 15 October: Austria, Federal Council
- 10 December: Bosnia and Herzegovina, House of Peoples
- 13 December: Gabon, Senate
- 17, 23 and 29 December: Greece, President

== See also ==
- 2014 in politics
