= Libyan Constitution =

Libyan Constitution may refer to:

- Constitution of Libya (1951), the first constitution of Libya, in effect 1951–1969
- Constitution of Libya (1969)
  - Declaration on the Establishment of the Authority of the People, an amendment to the 1969 constitution
  - The Green Book (Muammar Gaddafi), published in 1975 and describing Muammar Gaddafi's political philosophy, was "intended to be read by all people"
- Libyan interim Constitutional Declaration, in effect 2011–2013
- 2017 draft Libyan constitution, proposed in 2017 by a constituent assembly of 60 people elected in 2014
