= 2014 referendum =

There were several referendums in 2014

- 2014 Bulgarian electoral code referendum
- 2014 Danish Unified Patent Court membership referendum
- 2014 Egyptian constitutional referendum
- 2014 Kraków referendum
- 2014 Liechtenstein pensions referendum
- 2014 Lithuanian land sales referendum
- 2014 Northern Cyprus constitutional referendum
- 2014 Sammarinese referendum
- 2014 Slovenian archives law referendum
- 2014 Swiss referendums
- 2014 Yemeni constitutional referendum
- 2014 independence referendum
  - 2014 Catalan independence referendum
  - 2014 Crimean status referendum
  - 2014 Donbass status referendums
  - 2014 Iraqi Kurdistan independence referendum
  - 2014 Scottish independence referendum
  - 2014 Venetian independence referendum

== See also ==
- 2014 independence referendum (disambiguation)
