= Constitution of Libya (disambiguation) =

Constitution of Libya currently refers to the Libyan interim Constitutional Declaration introduced after the overthrow of the Gaddafi government in the Libyan civil war.

Constitution of Libya may also refer to:

- Constitution of Libya (1951), in effect until 1969 military coup by Muammar Gaddafi
- Constitution of Libya (1969), in effect until the adoption of the interim constitution in 2011
