= Libyan Constitutional Union =

The Libyan Constitutional Union is a Libyan monarchist political organization which proclaimed its opposition to the regime of Libya's Colonel Muammar Gaddafi on 7 October 1981 in Manchester, England.

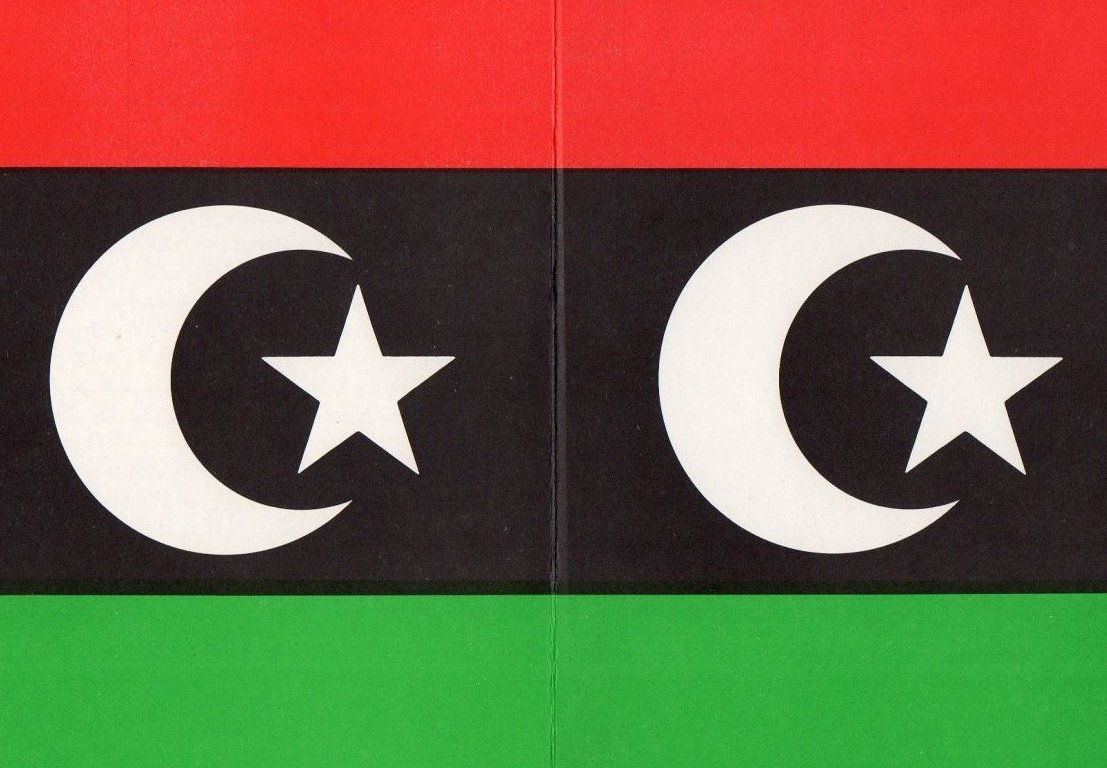
Cover of the LUC Proclamation Card Bearing the Libyan Flag of the Independence Era

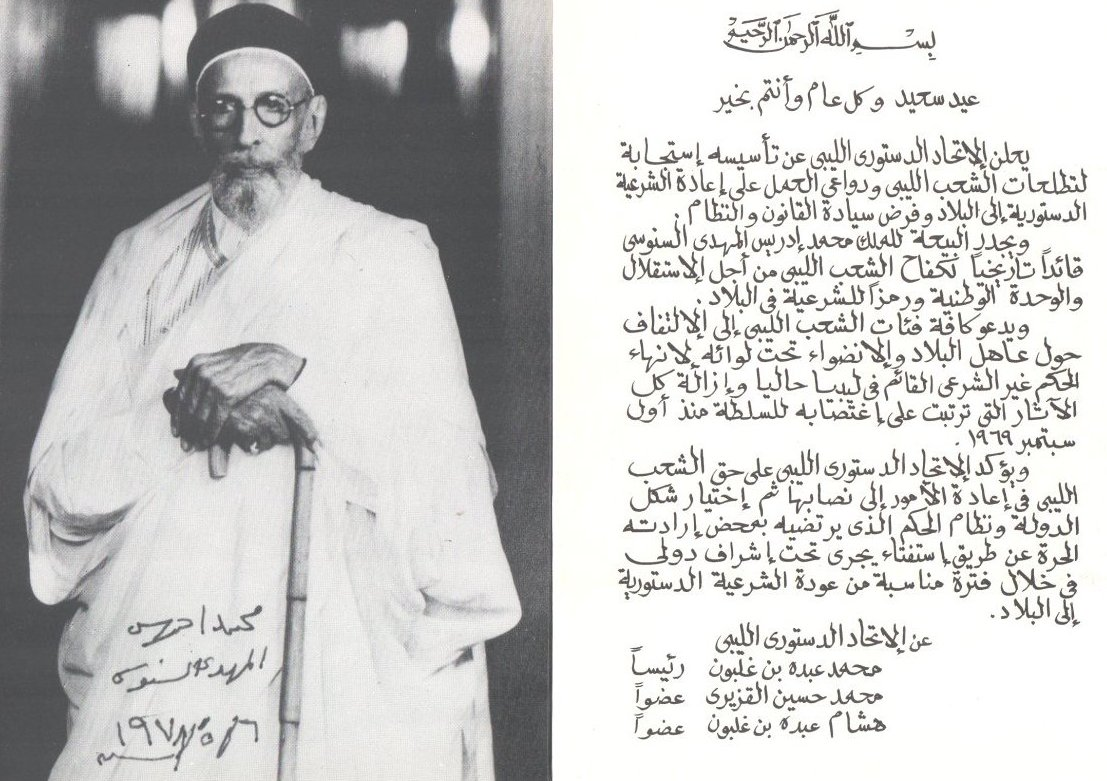
LUC Proclamation Card - 7th Oct 1981

The LCU called for the toppling of the regime of Colonel Gaddafi, which it deemed illegitimate as it had usurped power from the country's legitimate ruler - King Idris I - via a military coup d'etat, and not through a people's revolution as Gaddafi claimed.

The proclamation date marked the 30th anniversary of the promulgation of Libya's constitution on the advent of its independence in 1951. In 1981 this date also coincided with Eid Al-Adha. The LCU proclamation was issued in the form of an Eid greeting card signed by the LCU chairman (Mohamed Ben Ghalbon ) and two of its founding members (Mohamed Hussein Algazeri and Hisham Ben Ghalbon ). It was circulated among Libyans inside and outside Libya as well as the media and political figures and organizations.

The proclamation cited the LCU's aim "to restore constitutional legitimacy to Libya and to re-establish the rule of law". The LCU went on to call upon the Libyan people to reiterate their pledge of allegiance to King Idris El-Senussi - as a historical leader of the Libyan people's struggle for independence and national unity, and rally around him as a symbol of legality for the nation.

The proclamation ended by asserting "the Libyan people's right to restore justice and thereafter to decide such form of body politic and system of government as they may choose of their own free will in a referendum to be conducted under international supervision within a reasonable period following the restoration of constitutional legality to the nation".

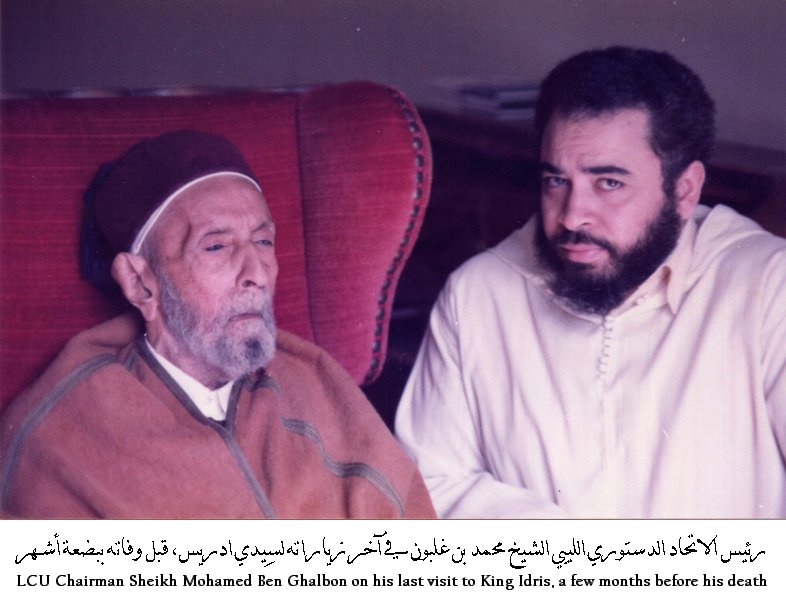
LUC Chairman Sheikh Mohamed Ben Ghalbon with King Idris I - Cairo

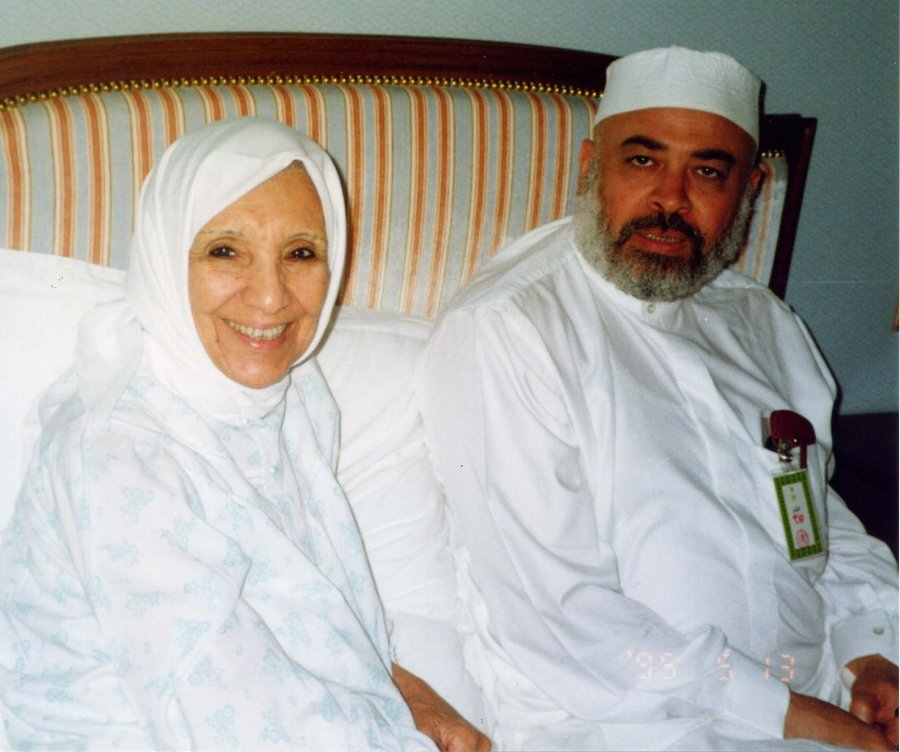
LUC Chairman Sheikh Mohamed Ben Ghalbon with Queen Fatima

The LCU's call to rally around the King and benefit from his constitutional legitimacy was not welcomed by other Libyan opposition groups in exile. None other than the LCU embraced it.

The LCU chairman repeatedly disclosed in newspaper articles that the organization was met with severe American hostility.

The LCU maintained that the complex structure of Libyan society and the impact its recent history had on it made it extremely vulnerable in the event of a political vacuum, no matter how short. It repeatedly warned of the calamities that would ensue should the dictatorship suddenly fall without Libyan society being safeguarded by the constitution. This view was not shared by other Libyan opposition groups in exile. They considered Libyan society to be a coherent and harmonious entity whose bonds would be unbreakable under any circumstances. They believed and argued that the fall of Gaddafi should be utilized as a beginning for a new political landscape in Libya free of any past political attachments.

In its obituary to King Idris following his death in Cairo on 25 May 1983, the LCU proposed the formation of a tentative national assembly to serve as a basis for all future democratic institutions in Libya. The LCU has always voiced their belief that the only way to successfully confront Gaddafi's illegitimate regime is by a united front standing on solid legal ground, i.e. the nation's ratified constitution.

The LCU vigorously counteracted the efforts of Gaddafi to strip Libya and its people of their national heritage and identity. In effect Gaddafi was enforcing the erroneous fact that Libya was born on the day of his coup d'état (1 September 1969). The LCU celebrated landmark national events in Libya's history. Dates such as 24 December (Independence Day), 21 November (UN resolution on Libya's independence) and 7 October (Constitution Day) which Gaddafi abolished and punished whoever commemorated them. In fact the LCU was the only organization which bore the standard of Libya's original tricolor flag. The flag was banned by Gaddafi and was cast aside by the other opposition organizations as they considered it a symbol of Libya's perished monarchy. Almost 24 years later the majority of Libyan opposition groups in exile held a conference in London on 25 June 2005. The “National Conference of the Libyan Opposition” took the original Libyan flag as its banner and adopted the Libyan constitution (1951) as the source of constitutional legitimacy. They stated in the conference’s final communiqué: “The Conference further emphasizes that the only legitimate constitution in Libya is that of 1951 with its subsequent amendments, which was endorsed and approved by the National Founding Committee under the supervision of a special committee of the United Nations. The oppressive action taken by the regime to cancel the constitution of 1951 is neither legal nor legitimate and therefore is fundamentally rejected”.

The founder of the LCU and his family were particularly attentive to the King and Queen in their exile. They dedicated themselves to serve and defend them until their final hours.

At the start of the February 2011 revolution, members of the LCU were amongst the first to be present on international media to support the uprising, explain its motives and aims and to introduce it to the world at large.

The LCU tried to convince the National Transitional Council and other politically active bodies through numerous public statements and open letters to reinstate the national constitution as a necessity of protecting the Libyan people from the inevitable downward spiral the country would be trapped in as a result of the political vacuum. The LCU withdrew from the press when these attempts were not successful and the NTC announced its intention to adopt the "constitutional declaration"; which the LCU chairman publicly described as an "inadequate document hastily patched up by unqualified individuals who lacked a popular mandate to bypass the nation's legitimate constitution".

== See also ==
- Constitution of Libya (1951)
- Libyan interim Constitutional Declaration
- Libyan Revolution
- King Idris
- Anti-Gaddafi forces
- Mohamed Ben Ghalbon
- 1969 Libyan coup d'état
