= Mohamed Ben Ghalbon =

Libyan politician

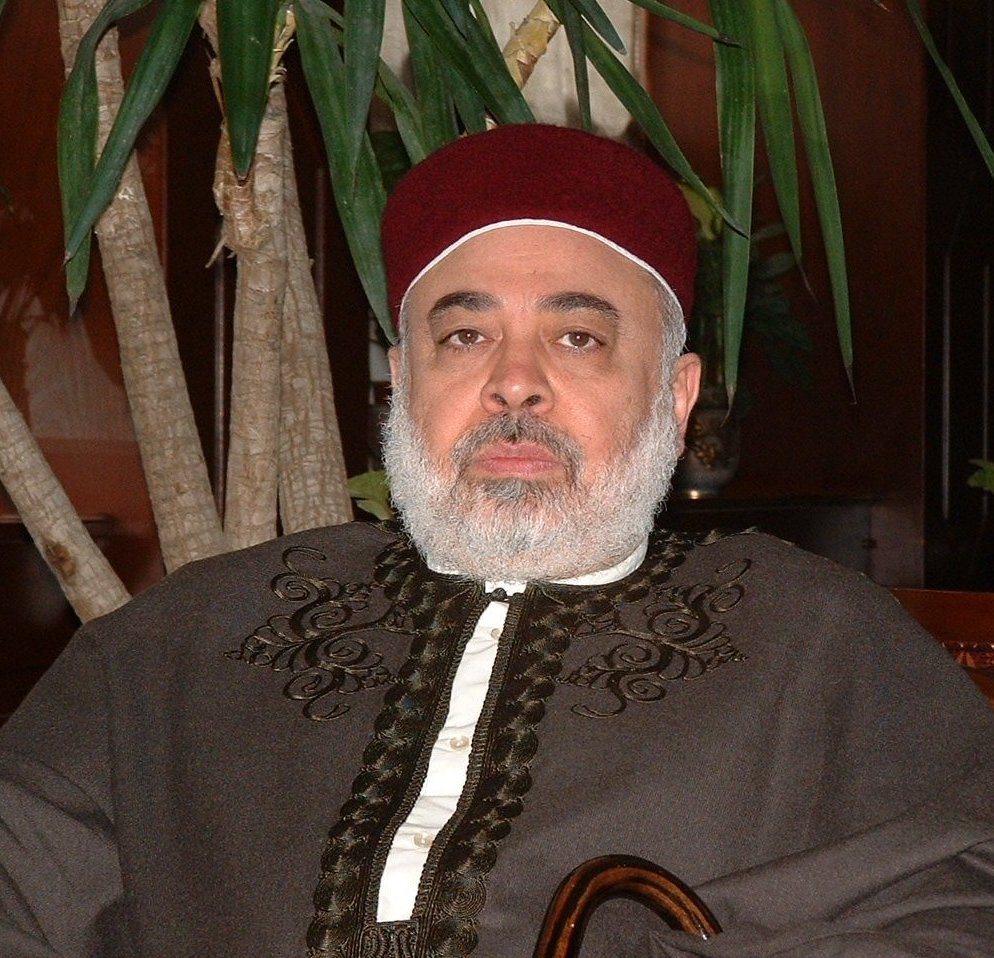
LCU Chairman Sheikh Mohamed Ben Ghalbon

Mohamed Ben Ghalbon is the founder and chairman of the Libyan Constitutional Union, and one of Colonel Gaddafi’s staunchest political opponents in exile. He is the leading advocate for the call for adherence to constitutional legitimacy (1951 Constitution) in confronting the regime of Muammar Gaddafi.

== Early life ==
Ben Ghalbon was born in Benghazi, Libya in 1947. He studied at "Al-Ameer" School, then in Benghazi High school. He followed his family’s tradition in trade and commerce and later in construction between 1968 and his departure from Libya to Britain in 1978 where he took up residence, with his wife and four children, in Manchester where his two younger brothers Hisham and Ali studied.

== Position Against the Gaddafi Regime ==
His first confrontation with Gaddafi’s regime was in September 1974 when he expressed his objection to the regime's introduction of the unprecedented policy of compulsory conscription for girls. He saw this as a calculated first step towards humiliating the Libyan people and undermining the traditions upon which Libya's conservative society was built. In the early hours of 8 September 1974 he carried out an armed attack on the barracks where the female students were detained in an attempt to release his sister who was a student at the Faculty of Law in Benghazi University. Of the three young male soldiers guarding the barracks the attack left one dead and two injured. This made him the first civilian to raise arms against the military junta ruling the country since 1 September 1969. He was subsequently arrested, detained and tortured, first in civilian then in military prisons in the period between September 1974 and early 1976 when he was acquitted of the charges against him due to lack of sufficient evidence to indict him. The judicial system was still free of the dominance of the junta’s security apparatus in Libya in those days. He was released when the authorities were satisfied that he was not part of an organised group who posed a serious threat. Despite the quashing of the charges against him Ben Ghalbon made contact with the soldier’s family as soon as the threat of political and security reprisals was negated with the collapse of the Gaddafi regime in 2011. He reached a satisfactory settlement in accordance with Islamic tradition, concluded an official judicial reconciliation and was granted a full pardon from the deceased's family who acknowledged that the attack was an act of rebellion against the regime and not aimed at their son.

During his first two years of exile in the UK, he participated in the clandestine political resistance which was in its early stages by lending support to the Libyan student union which his brothers Hisham and Ali were founding members of. He also communicated with the Libyan opposition groups which had just begun taking shape. He subsequently reached the conclusion that any effective political endeavour must be public, and that it must begin from the end of the "independence era". He believed the first step must be to undo the offence to the country's true leader and legitimate monarch, King Idris I, raise the true Libyan flag (the tricolour) and adopt the Libyan constitution which led to the birth of the Libyan state on 24 December 1951, as the source to constitutional legitimacy. And not to endorse its annulment by the Junta.

In August 1981 he visited King Idris in his exile in Cairo and reiterated the pledge of allegiance to His Majesty as historical leader of the Libyan people's struggle for independence and national unity and as a symbol of legality for the nation. He gained the King’s blessing to establish the Libyan Constitutional Union (LCU).

== Announcing the Libyan Constitutional Union (LCU) ==
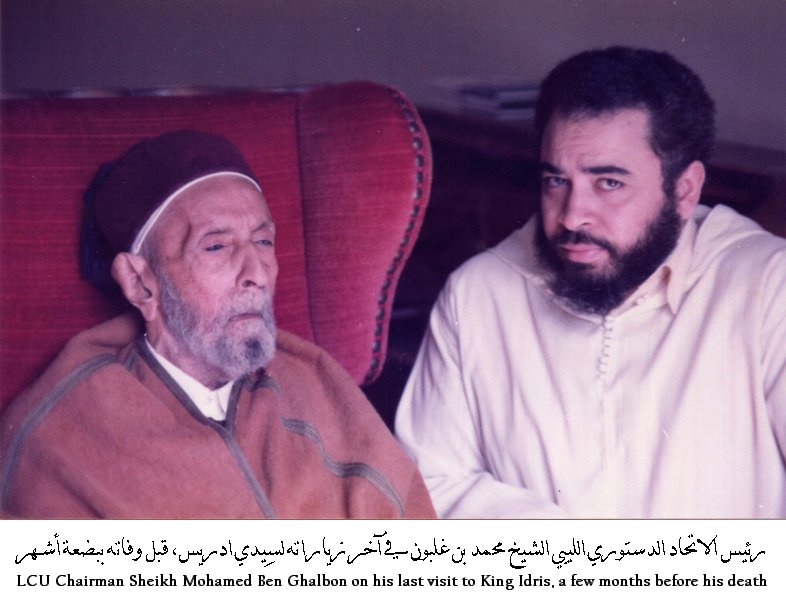
LUC Chairman Mohamed Ben Ghalbon with King Idris I - Cairo

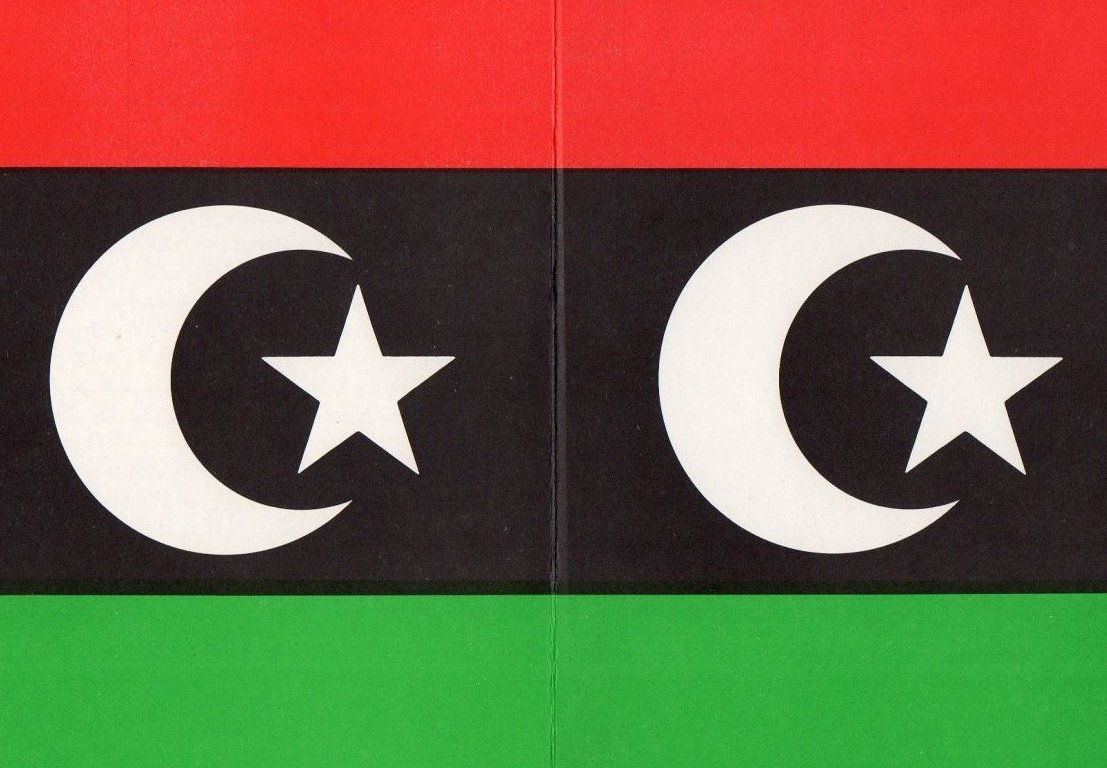
Back of LCU Proclamation Card bearing Libya’s Original Flag -7 Oct 1981

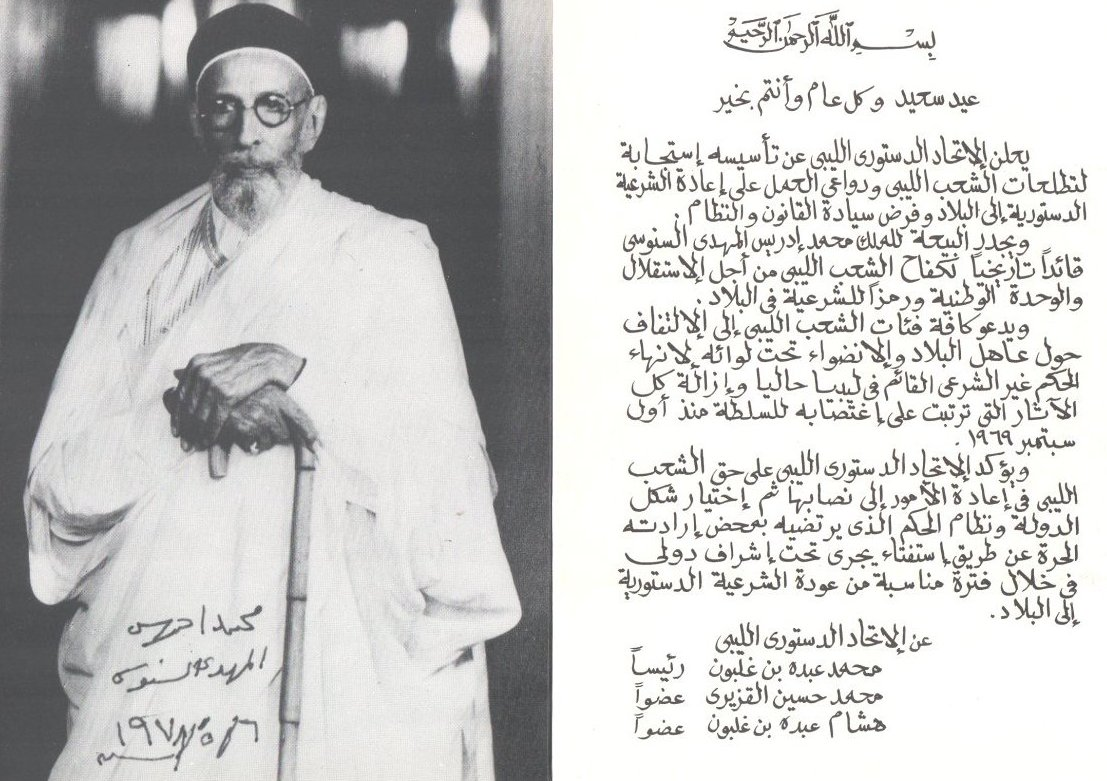
LCU Proclamation Card pledging allegiance to His Majesty King Idris I - October 7, 1981

The LCU was proclaimed on 7 October 1981 to confront the regime of Colonel Muammar Gaddafi, which it branded as an illegitimate regime which usurped power through a military coup d'état, not a popular revolution as it claimed. The LCU called upon all Libyan opposition spectra to rally around the King in order to return to the constitutional legitimacy of 1951 and embarrass the international community into the cessation of dealings with a regime that usurped power by force with neither a public mandate nor constitutional authority, while the legal representative of that constitutional legitimacy was very much alive with sectors of his people are calling for his return.

Mr. Ben Ghalbon and his family immediately became targets of Gaddafi's assassination teams notoriously known in the 1980s as "hit squads". Gaddafi openly labelled his political opponents "stray dogs" and ordered their "physical liquidation" wherever they may be.

He continued his opposition to Gaddafi's regime and propagating constitutional awareness amongst the Libyan people. He again became a target during the regime's wave of terrorist acts which began in the UK on 11 March 1984 with the two bombings in London and Manchester, and reached its deadly peak on 17 April 1984 with the murder of WPC Yvonne Fletcher with bullets fired from the Libyan People's Bureau while she was on duty organising a peaceful protest by Libyan opponents of the regime outside the People's Bureau in St James's Square. Mr. Ben Ghalbon and his family were placed under 24 hours armed police protection for several weeks since the beginning of the bombing campaign. Their lives returned to normality and the children resumed school only after diplomatic relations between the UK and Libya were severed on 23 April 1984 and England was totally rid of Gaddafi’s agents.

== His Relationship with King Idris I and Queen Fatima ==
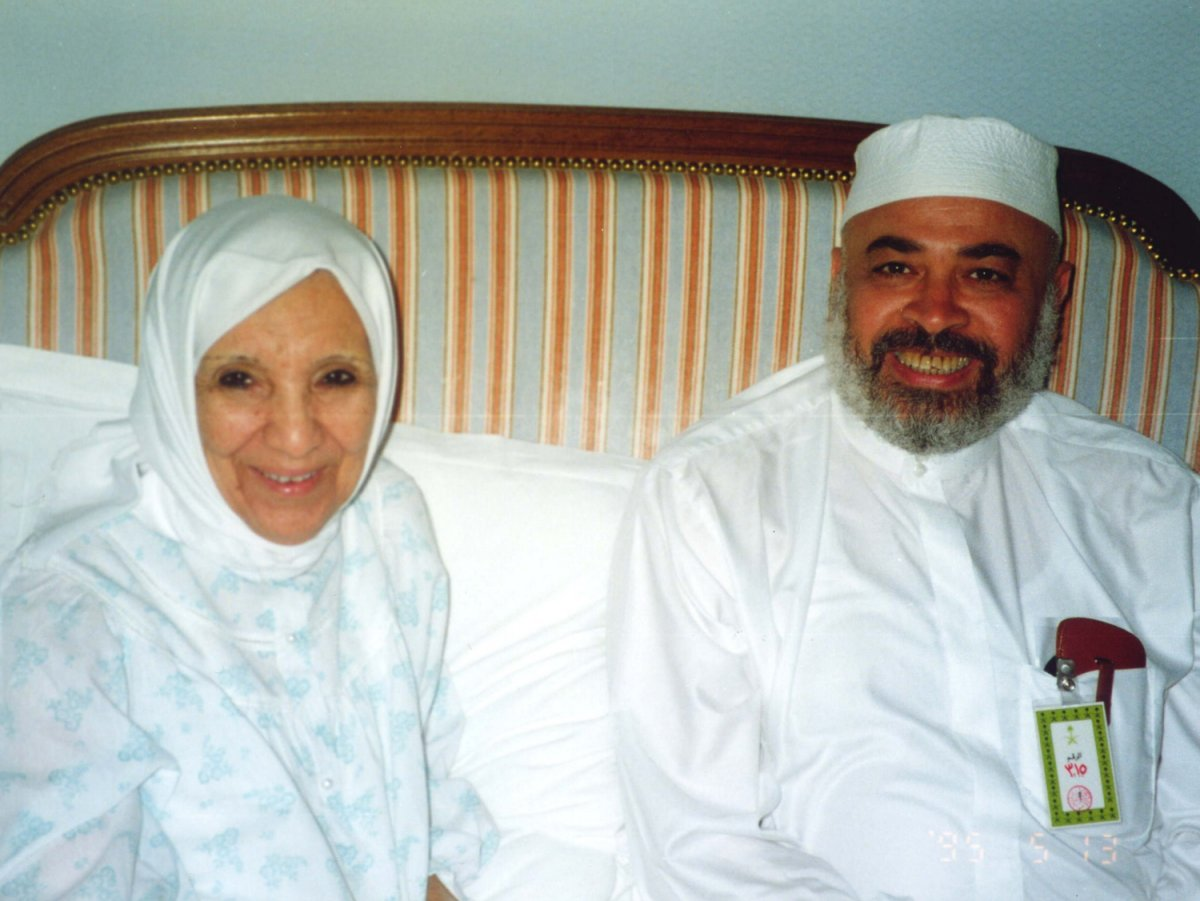
LUC Chairman Sheikh Mohamed Ben Ghalbon with Queen Fatima

Ben Ghalbon had a strong relationship with King Idris until His Majesty’s death on 25 May 1983, and with Queen Fatima whom he and his family served and defended until her final hours. Both he and his brother Hisham were by her bed side in the hospital when she died on 3 October 2009.

In coordination with the Crown Prince of the Kingdom of Libya Prince Al-Hassan Al-Rida Al-Sanussi, who was receiving medical care in the UK, he launched an intense humanitarian media campaign to publicise the Prince’s plight and bring to the attention of Arab Royalties the severe hardship he was suffering as a result of Gaddafi's callas exploitation of his poor health and financial conditions. He initiated that campaign with an open letter addressed to Colonel Gaddafi which he published as a paid advert in the London The Guardian newspaper of 2 April 1992. He opened the letter by saying: "Misfortune brought one of the Arab noblemen to remain under your rule for more than twenty years" and went on to expose his cruelty and abuse of the Prince and concluded it by asking him: "How can a man reach this level of fiendish behaviour? And Why?" The story was snapped up by Arab and International media. He followed it up with press statements and interviews with Arabic and International newspapers. The campaign ended with a significant positive impact on the Prince's conditions.

== The First Book about King Idris ==
Eric Armar Vully de Candole, CBE, who held the post of Her Britannic Majesty's Resident, Cyrenaica, wrote a unique book "The Life and Times of King Idris of Libya", the nearest thing to a biography of the late King. When he failed to find a publisher to publish and distribute the book he published it privately in a 250 copy run as a tribute to his lifetime friend. In 1989 Mr. Ben Ghalbon re-published it in both English and Arabic language after reaching an agreement with the author's heirs and enhancing it with footnotes, appendices and a large number of photos. He distributed it free of charge in large numbers among Libyans inside and outside Libya as well as Public and University libraries and research centres worldwide, to counter the regime's relentless attacks to defame the King and his true role in shaping modern Libya, and in order to correct his history from the systematic distortion inflicted on him by the regime's propaganda machine.

== The case of the Jews of Libya ==
Ben Ghalbon contributed some substantive documentary articles on the subject of the Jews of Libya and their abrupt exodus from the country following the six days war in June 1967 which he published in several serialised articles in the London-based Arabic daily Al-Hayat newspaper. He relied mainly on official British documents released after 30 years and reports of the British Military Administration (Libya) which was in charge of the country during the disturbances of 1945 and 1948, as well as authoritative Jewish sources . His contribution offered much needed source information to dispel the blur that surrounded that thorny issue, and expel many of the fallacies and fabrications which were written in the absence of a fair and neutral narrative of those events.

== The February Revolution ==
Mr Ben Ghalbon was quick to lend his full support to the February revolution from its early hours. He immediately called for the need for the prompt activation of the Libyan Constitution and enactment of the necessary laws from it to secure stability and the rule of law until the Libyan people are past the upheaval of the collapse of the Gaddafi regime and in a position to decide such form of body politic and system of government they may choose of their own free will. He repeatedly and openly warned of the dangers of civil war and fragmentation in the event of political vacuum no matter how short. He took a step back when the National Transitional Council ignored his call and adopted the “Libyan Interim constitutional declaration" on 3 August 2011, which he publicly described as an "inadequate document hastily patched up by unqualified individuals who lacked a popular mandate to bypass the nation's legitimate constitution".

== Water Conservation in the Islamic World: The “Moudd & Saa’” Initiative ==
In response to the escalating water management problems in the Islamic world, Ben Ghalbon launched the “Moudd & Sa’a” initiative in 2001. The Initiative was based on facilitating the employment of “Sunna” (the traditions of Prophet Mohamed) to stimulate Muslims to become environmentally responsible citizens fully aware of their duties towards water resources, and their religious and moral obligations towards its preservation. His novel concept suggested introducing minor, low cost, minimally invasive adjustments in standard modern bathrooms in order to simplify the adherence to the teachings of Prophet Mohamed, who encouraged his followers to conserve water no matter how abundant it was. He derived the name “Moudd & Saa’” from the quantities of water the prophet used for his “Wudu & Ghussl” (minor & major ablution). In 2015, “Masdar Institute of Science and Technology” developed this idea by producing a low cost, easy to install and user friendly device that limits the amount of ablution water to 1200 millilitres and is fitted with a line at the 600 millilitres index to encourage adherence to the amount that sufficed the Prophet for his Wudu.

== See also ==
- The Libyan Constitutional Union
