= 1964 Libyan general election =

- 10 October 1964

General elections were held in Libya on 10 October 1964 to elect the members of the House of Representatives, the lower house of Parliament. 103 members were elected by universal suffrage introduced by the 1963 constitutional changes, which also increased the number of MPs from the 55 elected in 1960. Reported turnout at the elections was 70%.

Following the 1952 elections political parties had been banned, so all candidates contested the election as independents. Although its spokesmen were arrested, the opposition managed to obtain representation in parliament. As a result, King Idris dissolved the Assembly and early elections were held the following year.
