= Chamber of Deputies =

Type of legislative body

The chamber of deputies is the lower house in many bicameral legislatures and the sole house in some unicameral legislatures.

== Description ==
Historically, the French Chamber of Deputies was the lower house of the French Parliament during the Bourbon Restoration, the July Monarchy, and the French Third Republic; the name is still informally used for the National Assembly under the nation's current Fifth Republic.

The term "chamber of deputies" is not widely used by English-speaking countries, the more popular equivalent being "House of Representatives", an exception being Burma, a former British colony, where it was the name of the lower house of the country's parliament. It was also the official description of Dáil Éireann (the lower house of the Irish parliament) during the period of the Irish Free State.

In Malta, the House of Representatives is known, in Maltese, as Kamra tad-Deputati. In Lebanon, the literal Arabic name of that country's parliament is Majlis an-Nuwwab, or, "Chamber of Deputies"—although officially used French and even English translations are "Assemblée Nationale" and "National Assembly" respectively.

A member of a "chamber of deputies" is generally called a "deputy", the definition of which is similar to that of "congressperson" or "member of parliament". The term "deputy" may refer to any member of a legislative body or chamber; this usage is particularly common in those French-speaking countries whose parliaments are called "national assemblies" and Spanish-speaking countries with legislative bodies called "congresses"; the term is also used by Portugal's Assembly of the Republic. In Ireland, it is used as a form of address when referring to members of Dáil Éireann instead of the Irish language term Teachta Dála, while in the Channel Islands, "Deputy" is used as the official title of most of the members of the States Assembly in Jersey and all but two of the members of the States of Deliberation in Guernsey.

== Chamber of Deputies in bicameral legislatures ==
In the following countries, the Chamber of Deputies is part of the bicameral legislature.

Country	Article	Local name(s)
Argentina	Chamber of Deputies of Argentina	Cámara de Diputados
Bahrain	Chamber of Deputies (Bahrain)	Majlis an-nuwab
Bolivia	Chamber of Deputies of Bolivia	Cámara de Diputados
Brazil	Chamber of Deputies (Brazil)	Câmara dos Deputados
Chile	Chamber of Deputies of Chile	Cámara de Diputadas y Diputados
Czech Republic	Chamber of Deputies (Czech Republic)	Poslanecká sněmovna
Dominican Republic	Chamber of Deputies (Dominican Republic)	Cámara de Diputados
Equatorial Guinea	Chamber of Deputies (Equatorial Guinea)	Cámara de los Diputados
Haiti	Chamber of Deputies of Haiti	Chambre des Députés
Italy	Chamber of Deputies (Italy)	Camera dei Deputati
Mexico	Chamber of Deputies (Mexico)	Cámara de Diputados
Paraguay	Chamber of Deputies of Paraguay	Cámara de Diputados
Peru	Chamber of Deputies of Peru	Cámara de Diputados
Romania	Chamber of Deputies (Romania)	Camera Deputaților
Rwanda	Chamber of Deputies of Rwanda	Umutwe w'Abadepite; Chambre des Députés
Spain	Congress of Deputies	Congreso de los Diputados
Tunisia	Chamber of Deputies (Tunisia)	Majlis an-Nuwwāb
Uruguay	Chamber of Deputies (Uruguay)	Cámara de Representantes

== Unicameral legislatures ==
In the following countries, 'Chamber of Deputies' is the name given to the unicameral legislative assembly:

Country	Article	Local Name
Lebanon	Chamber of Deputies (Lebanon)	Parlement (Parliament) مجلس النواب (Majles Nuweb)
Luxembourg	Chamber of Deputies (Luxembourg)	Chambre des députés (French); D'Chamber (Luxembourgish)

== Defunct chambers of deputies ==
In the following countries and territories, there used to be a legislature known as the Chamber of deputies, now no longer named as such or extant.

- Burma (Note: Legislature disbanded)
- Congo-Kinshasa (Note: New constitution, unicameral system adopted)
- Czechoslovakia (Note: Government abolished, absorbed into another country)
- Egypt
- Ethiopia
- France
- Iraq
- Kingdom of Italy
- Libya
- Nicaragua
- Ottoman Empire
- Portugal: Chamber of Deputies of the Portuguese Nation, lower house of the Cortes Gerais and Chamber of Deputies of the Portuguese Republic, lower house of the Congress of the Republic
- Sardinia
- Venezuela
- Republic of Negros and Republic of Zamboanga (now a region of the Philippines)
- Bahia
- Ceará
- Pernambuco
- São Paulo

== See also ==
- List of national legislatures
- List of legislatures by country
- House of Representatives
- National Assembly
- House of Commons
