= Mohamed Abulasʽad El-ʽAlem =

Libyan Grand Mufti

- Title: President of National Assembly

Mohamed Abulasʽad El-ʽAlem (محمد أبو الأسعاد العالم, Mohammad Abu al-ʼAsʽad al-ʽAlim) was the mufti of Tripolitania from 1945 to 1951 and elected president of the Libyan National Assembly in 1951. He was a signatory to the original Libyan Constitution of 1951, along with two Vice-Presidents of the National Assembly, Omar Faiek Shennib and Abu Baker Ahmed Abu Baker.
