= 2014 independence referendum =

There were several referendums on independence in 2014:

- 2014 Catalan independence referendum
- 2014 Crimean status referendum
- 2014 Donbass status referendums
- 2014 Scottish independence referendum
- 2014 Venetian independence referendum

== See also ==
- Independence referendum
- 2014 referendum (disambiguation)
