= 1956 Libyan general election =

- 7 January 1956
- All 55 seats in the House of Representatives
Party	Vote %	Seats
Independents	100	55
This lists parties that won seats. See the complete results below.
Prime Minister before	Prime Minister after
Mustafa Ben Halim	Mustafa Ben Halim

General elections were held in Libya on 7 January 1956 to elect the members of the House of Representatives, the lower house of Parliament.

The House of Representatives had 55 seats, one for every 20,000 inhabitants. Following the 1952 elections, political parties and political gatherings had been banned, so all candidates contested the election as independents. As a result, voting was based largely on personality, clan ties, and nepotism. Thirty candidates were elected unopposed.
