= Hisham Ben Ghalbon =

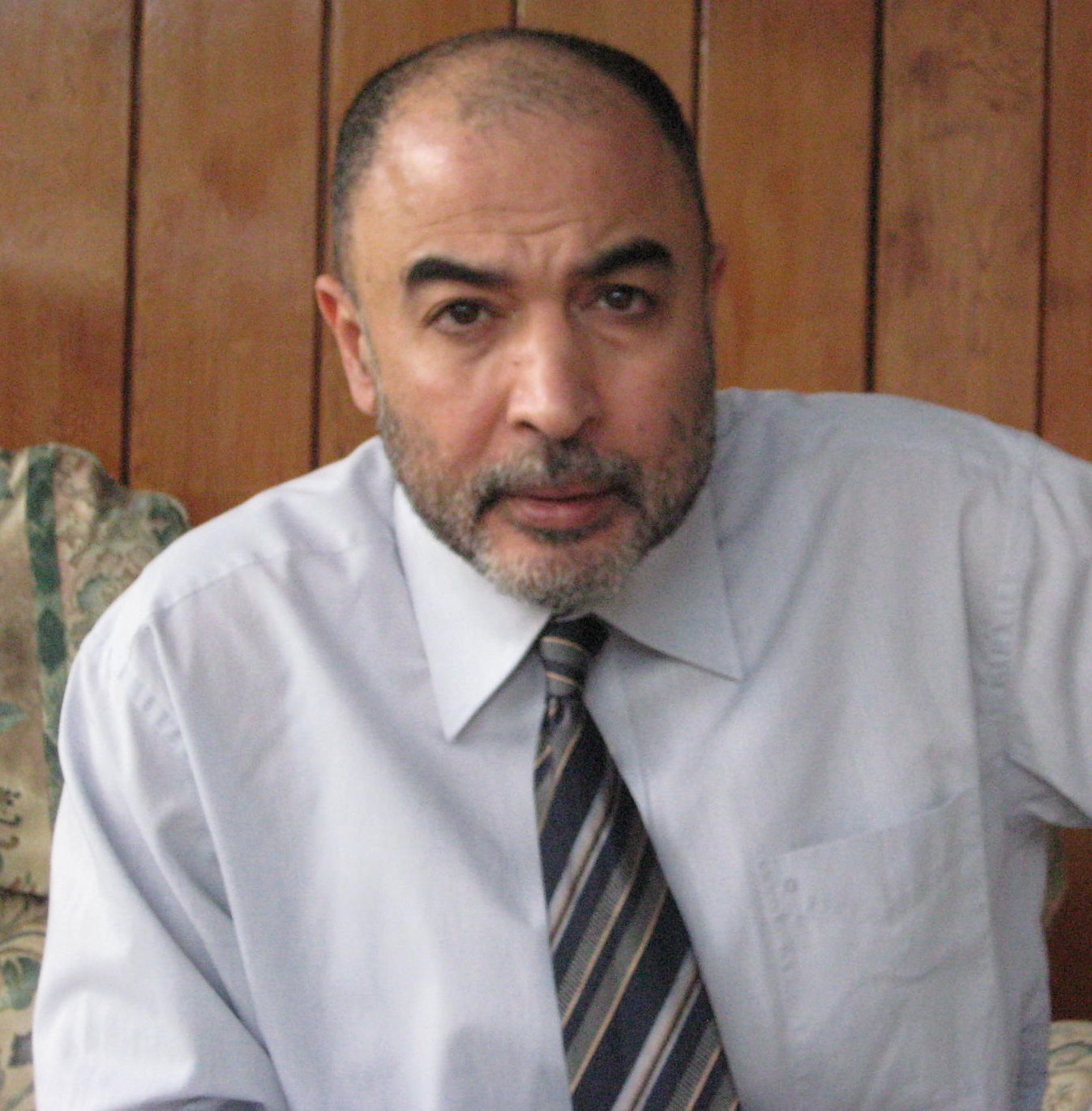
Ghalbon in 2011

Hisham (also spelt Hashem) Ben Ghalbon is a founding member and spokesman for Libyan Constitutional Union (LCU) and was an opponent of the regime of Libyan leader Muammar Gaddafi since the mid 1970s when Ben Ghalbon was a student at the faculty of Engineering in the University of Tripoli.

== Early life ==
Hisham Ben Ghalbon was born in Benghazi in 1955. He studied at the city's Model Primary School then at Salah-Eddin High School before traveling to Tripoli to study Mechanical Engineering at the University of Tripoli. He was a keen horse rider and owner and was an active member in the Benghazi Riding Club since its 1969 foundation, where he won several trophies in local and national show jumping competitions.

In Tripoli he took part in the April 1976 peaceful student revolt which later became known as the "first uprising" and was among dozens of students arrested and detained by the regime's "revolutionary elements" that had taken over the university. He, along with other detainees, was later expelled from the University for protesting against the regime.

He traveled to Britain later that year to finish his education and continue his opposition to the Gaddafi regime. He resided with his younger brother Ali in Manchester where he studied Mechanical Engineering at Manchester Polytechnic (now Manchester Metropolitan University) until 1982.

== Establishing the Dissident Libyan Student Union (UK) ==
In 1979 he co-founded the British branch of the dissident Libyan Student Union with the union's president Ahmad Thulthi and others. He took a leading role in student protests against Gaddafi in Britain, including editing and publishing the union's journal “April Martyrs”, and organizing the first demonstration in front of the Libyan Embassy in London on 11 June 1980 in defiance of the wave of assassinations carried out by the regime's notorious “death squads.” These “squads” were dispatched from Libya to execute Gaddafi's command to “physically liquidate” his opponents abroad whom he publicly labelled “stray dogs” in his televised speeches. Among the victims of that campaign in Britain alone were the BBC London journalist Mohamed Mustafa Ramadan, gunned down on 11 April 1980 outside London’s Regent Mosque as he was leaving after Friday prayer, the lawyer Mahmoud Nafa, also shot in London on 25 April 1980 and the student Ahmad Burghia, savagely knifed and mutilated in Manchester on 29 November 1980.

== The Libyan Constitutional Union ==
He co-founded the political opposition organization The Libyan Constitutional Union (LCU) which was launched in Manchester on 7 October 1981 (the 30th anniversary of the promulgation of the Libyan Constitution), pledging allegiance to Libya's former ruler King Idris El-Senusi as a symbol of constitutional legitimacy.

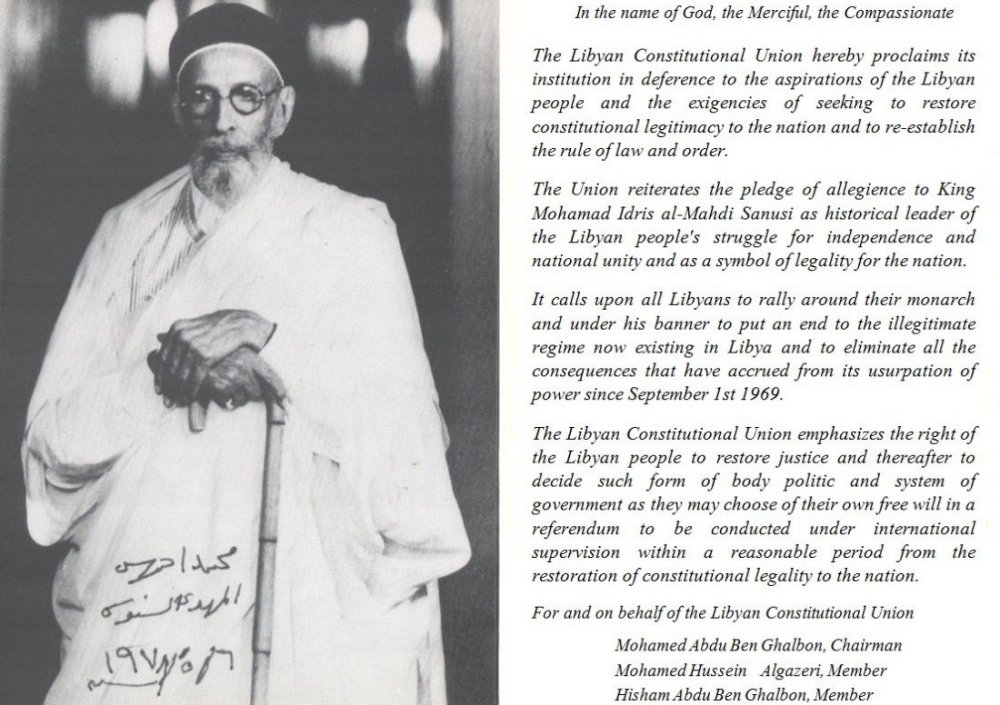
LCU Proclamation Card, 7th Oct 1981

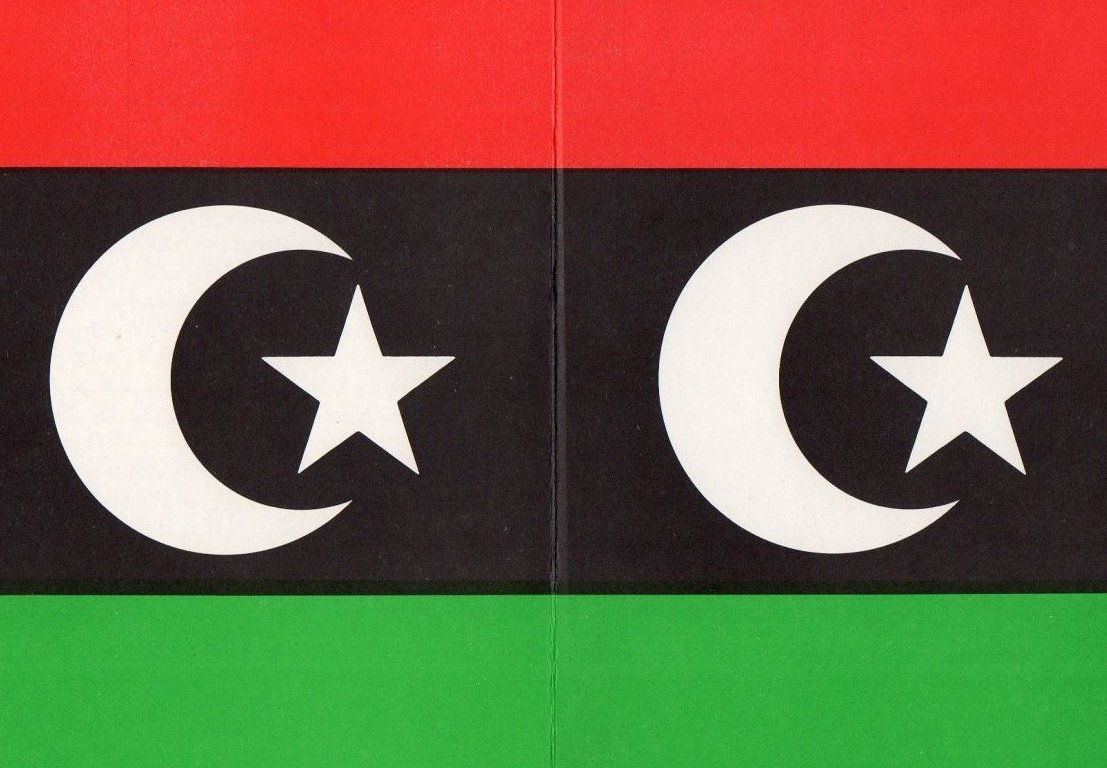
Back of LCU Proclamation Card bearing Libya's former flag - 7th Oct 1981

The LCU raised the Libyan flag of independence (the tricolour) which Gaddafi banned as soon as he usurped power through a coup d'état on 1 September 1969 and called upon fellow Libyan opposition groups in exile to fly the national flag and take the 1951 Libyan Constitution as a source of legitimacy to confront Gaddafi's illegitimate regime until the regime is toppled and the people were able to "decide such form of body politic and system of government as they may choose of their own free will in a referendum to be conducted under international supervision within a reasonable period following the restoration of constitutional legality to the nation".

Ben Ghalbon, Mohamed Ben Ghalbon and Mohamed Algazeri were publicly named on the LCU's proclamation card making them one of very few opponents of Gaddafi who publicly opposed him at that time. He later became the official spokesman of the LCU.

Both he and his family became immediate targets of the "revolutionary committee's" assassination teams. They had to be placed under 24-hour armed Police protection when a home he had lived in was bombed in the early hours of 11 March 1984 during the regime's wave of terrorist acts in Europe which began the previous day in London with the bombing of a kiosk that sold Libyan opposition magazines. These terrorist acts reached their deadly peak on 17 April 1984 with the murder of WPC Yvonne Fletcher with bullets fired from a window of the Libyan Embassy in London while she was on duty patrolling a peaceful protest by Libyan dissidents outside the embassy in St. James Square. Their lives returned to normality only after diplomatic relations between the UK and Libya were severed on 23 April 1984 and Gaddafi's agents left the UK.

== Publicising the 1996 Abu Salim prison massacre ==
Since the beginning of May 2010 Ben Ghalbon co-organised the weekly vigils held in Manchester by political activists from the north of England in solidarity with the families of the victims of the Abu Salim Prison massacre in which more than 1260 civilian detainees were murdered on 29 June 1996 in Tripoli, and to support their families demands for a fair inquest and to bring the perpetrators of that crime to justice. The vigils in Manchester were held every Saturday afternoon to coincide with the victim's families vigils in front of Benghazi's court at the same time. The massacre received close attention by international human rights organizations such as Amnesty International and Human Rights Watch and was widely publicised in their literature.

== February Revolution ==
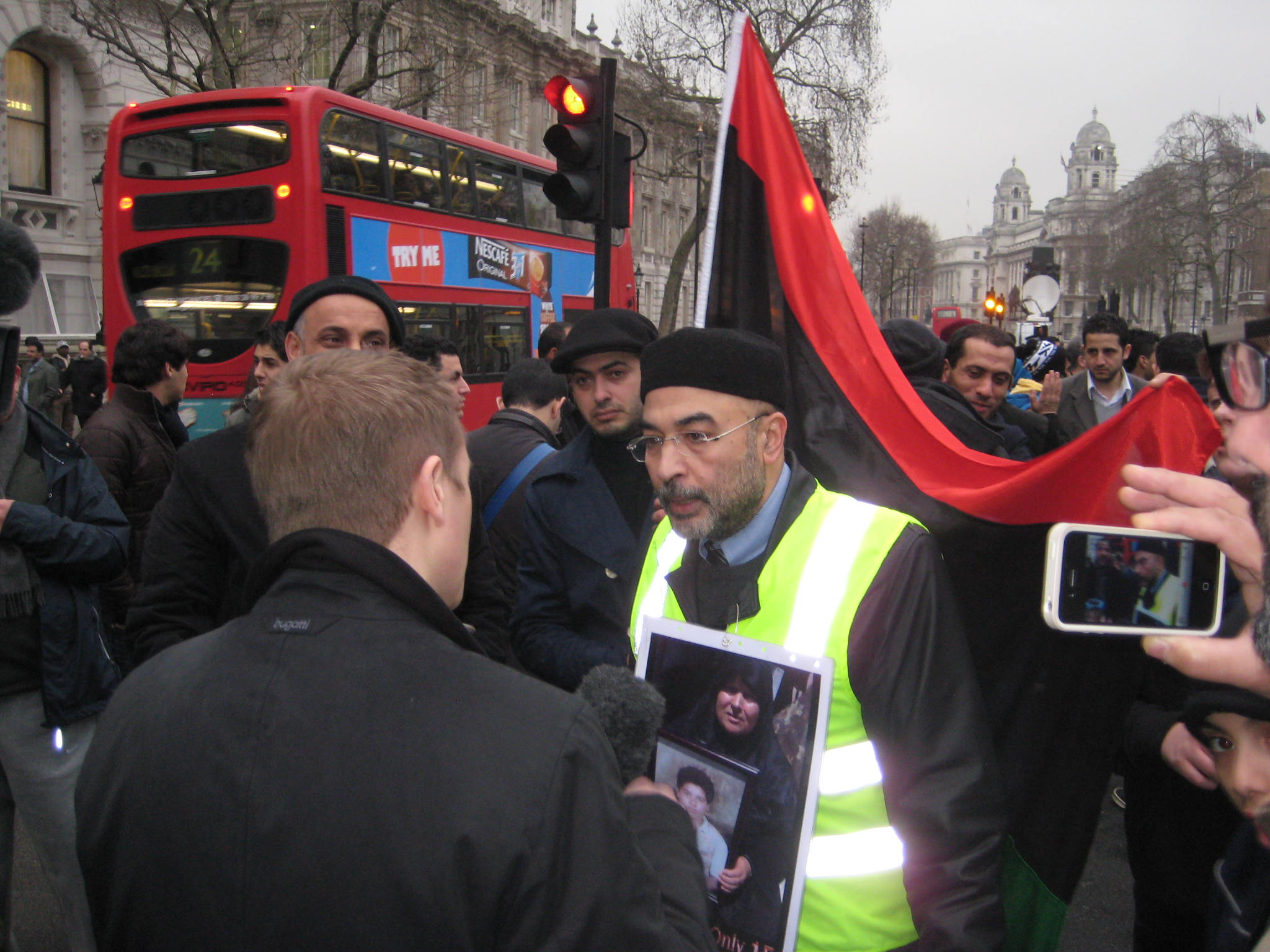
Demonstration of the Libyan Community in Britain in front of 10 Downing Street to support the February Revolution (22 Feb 2011)

On the morning of 16 February 2011, Ben Ghalbon co-organised the first demonstration outside Libya to support the February Revolution that had broken out the previous night in the city of Benghazi. Libyan residents in Manchester gathered in the city's Albert Square to express their solidarity with the demonstrators in Libya and be "the echo of their voice". He also played an active role in organising the daily demonstrations in Manchester and issuing daily bulletins of the latest developments on the ground to raise public awareness in Britain and provide the media with the latest facts after the regime enforced a news blackout by blocking the internet and other lines of communications with the outside world in the early days of the uprising. He participated in organizing demonstrations in front of 10 Downing Street, the office of the British Prime Minister, in front of the embassies of countries that were still sympathetic to Gaddafi and his regime, as well as in the picketing in front of the Libyan Embassy in London until it was taken over by the pro-revolution Libyans and the flag of independence flew on its mast. He appeared regularly on Arabic and English TV channels to support the revolution and counter propaganda from the Libyan regime.

In the early days of the Revolution the LCU attempted to persuade the National Transitional Council (NTC) and those in charge of post revolution Libya that the adoption of the nation's 1951 constitution was necessary to prevent a political vacuum and stop the country entering a violent distantergation that the sudden collapse of Gaddafi's rule would inevitably bring about. When this along with the LCU warning of the dangers of fragmentation of the country and civil war were ignored, Ben Ghalbon withdrew from the media and refrained from publicly commenting on the chaos that has since overwhelmed the country. He now lives and works in Manchester.

== See also ==
- The Libyan Constitutional Union
