= Constitution of Libya (1951) =

Former constitution of Libya

The 1951 Libyan Constitution, formally the Constitution of the United Kingdom of Libya, then from 1963, the Constitution of the Kingdom of Libya, was brought into force on October 7, 1951, prior to Libya's formal declaration of its independence on December 24, 1951 as a constitutional and hereditary monarchy under the rule of King Idris. It served as the supreme law of the land of the Libyan state. The enactment of the Libyan Constitution was significant in that it was the first and only piece of legislation that formally entrenched the rights of Libyan citizens after the post-war creation of the Libyan nation state.

The Libyan National Assembly drafted the Constitution and passed a resolution accepting it in a meeting held in Benghazi on October 7, 1951. Mohamed Abulas’ad El-Alem, President of the National Assembly and the two vice-presidents of the National Assembly, Omar Faiek Shennib and Abu Baker Ahmed Abu Baker executed and submitted the Constitution to King Idris prior to its publication in the Official Gazette of Libya.

The Constitution became the first piece of legislation to formally entrench the rights of Libyan citizens following the post-war creation of the Libyan nation state. Following on from the intense UN debates, during which Idris had argued that the creation of a single Libyan state would be of benefit to the regions of Tripolitania, Fezzan, and Cyrenaica, the Libyan government was keen to formulate a constitution which contained many of the entrenched rights common to European and North American nation states.

Following the "Green Revolution" military coup of September 1, 1969, led by Muammar Gaddafi, that overthrew the monarchy and the Libyan National Assembly, the Libyan Constitution was no longer in effect. The Green Book put forth by Gaddafi became the foundation of the laws of Libya.

== Constitution of the Kingdom of Libya ==
The Constitution of the Kingdom of Libya included a Preamble and twelve Chapters outlining the protection of human rights in Libya and regulating the nature and functions of the institutional apparatus of the Libyan State. Law N. 1 of 1963 abolished Chapter 3 and Articles 173, 174, and 175, thereby suppressing the Federal Regime originally established by the 1951 Constitution.

Chapter 1 of the 1951 Constitution defined the “Form of State and System of Government of the Country”, while Chapter 2 described the “Rights of People”. Chapter 3, repealed in 1963, included a first section regarding the “Powers of the Federal Government” and a second section pertaining to “Joint Powers.”

Chapter 4 organized the Libyan State's “General Powers” arrangement, further articulated in Chapters 5 through 8 (“The King”; “The Ministers”; “Parliament”, including three sections regulating “The Senate”, “The House of Representatives”, and “Provisions Common to the Two Chambers”; “The Judiciary”).

Finally, Chapter 9 through 12 discussed Libya's “Fiscal System” (as amended in 1963), the “Local Administration”, as well as “General Provisions” and “Transitory and Provisional Provisions.”

== Preamble ==
The Preamble to the Libyan Constitution sets out the terms under which the union of the regions of Cyrenaica, Tripolitania and Fezzan into Libya came about:

In the name of God the beneficent, the merciful.
We, the representatives of the people of Libya from Cyrenaica, Tripolitania and Fezzan, meeting by the will of God in the cities of Tripoli and Benghazi in a National Constituent Assembly. Having agreed and determined to form a union (1) between us under the Crown of King Mohammad Idris el Senussi, to whom the nation has offered the Crown and who was declared constitutional King of Libya by this the National Constituent Assembly. And having decided and determined to establish a democratic independent sovereign State which will guarantee the national unity, safeguard domestic tranquillity, provide the means for common defence, secure the establishment of justice, guarantee the principles of liberty, equality, and fraternity and promote economic and social progress and the general welfare. And trusting in God, Master of the Universe, do hereby prepare and resolve this Constitution for the Kingdom of Libya (2).

(1) Federal Regime repealed by Law No. 1 of 1963. (2) Name of the State amended to read "The Kingdom of Libya" by Law No. 1 of 1963.

== The Libyan Constitution ==
The full text of Chapters I and II of the Constitution of Libya is below

Constitution of Libya

Chapter I-The Form of the State and the System of Government

Article 1
Libya is a free independent sovereign State. Neither its sovereignty nor any part of its territories may be relinquished.

Article 2
Libya is a State having a hereditary monarchy, and its system of Government is representative. Its name is "THE KINGDOM OF LIBYA".

Article 3
The Kingdom of Libya is a part of the Arab Home-Land and a portion of the African Continent.

Article 4
The boundaries of the Kingdom of Libya are:-

On the North, the Mediterranean Sea;
On the East, the United Arab Republic and the Republic of Sudan;
On the South, the Republic of Sudan, Chad, Niger and Algeria;
On the West, the Republics of Tunisia and Algeria.

Article 5
Islam is the religion of the State.

Article 6
The emblem of the State and its national anthem shall be prescribed by a law.

Article 7
The national flag shall have the following shape and dimensions:

Its length shall be twice its breadth, it shall be divided into three parallel coloured stripes, the uppermost being red, the centre black and the lowest green, the black stripe shall be equal in area to the two other stripes together and shall bear in its centre a white crescent, between the two extremities of which there shall be a five-pointed white star.

Chapter II-Rights of the People

Article 8
Every person who resides in Libya and has no other nationality, or is not the subject of any other State, shall be deemed to be a Libyan if he fulfils one of the following conditions:-

(1) that he was born in Libya;
(2) that either of his parents were born in Libya;
(3) that he has had his normal residence in Libya for a period of not less than ten years.

Article 9
Subject to the provisions of Article 8 of this Constitution, the conditions necessary for acquiring Libyan nationality shall be determined by a law. Such law shall grant facilities to expatriates of Libyan origin residing abroad and to their children, and to citizens of Arab countries, and to foreigners who are residing in Libya and who at the coming into force of this Constitution have had their normal residence in Libya for a period of not less than ten years. Persons of the latter category may opt for Libyan nationality in accordance with the conditions prescribed by the law, provided they apply for it within three years as from 1 January 1952.

Article 10
No one may have Libyan nationality and any other nationality at the same time.

Article 11
Libyans shall be equal before the law. They shall enjoy equal civil and political rights, shall have the same opportunities, and be subject to the same public duties and obligations, without distinction of religion, belief, race, language, wealth, kinship or political or social opinions.

Article 12
Personal liberty shall be guaranteed and everyone shall be entitled to equal protection of the law.

Article 13
No forced labour shall be imposed upon anyone save in accordance with law in cases of emergency, catastrophe or circumstances which may endanger the safety of the whole or part of the population.

Article 14
Everyone shall have the right to resource to the Courts, in accordance with the provisions of the law.

Article 15
Everyone charged with an offence shall be presumed to be innocent until proved guilty according to law in a trial at which he has the guarantees necessary for his defence. The trial shall be public save in exceptional cases prescribed by law.

Article 16
No one may be arrested, detained, imprisoned or searched except in the cases prescribed by law. No one shall under any circumstances be tortured by anyone or subjected to punishment degrading to him.

Article 17
No offence may be established or penalty inflicted except shall be subject to the penalties specified therein for those offences; the penalty inflicted shall not be heavier than the penalty that was applicable at the time the offence was committed.

Article 18
No Libyan may be deported from Libya under any circumstances nor may he be forbidden to reside in any locality or compelled to reside in any specific place or prohibited from moving in Libya except as prescribed by law.

Article 19
Dwelling houses are inviolable; they shall not be entered or searched except in cases and according to the manner prescribed by law.

Article 20
The secrecy of letters, telegrams, telephone communications and all correspondences in whatever form and by whatever means shall be guaranteed; they shall not be censored or delayed except in cases prescribed by law.

Article 21
Freedom of conscience shall be absolute. The State shall respect all religions and faiths and shall ensure to foreigners residing in its territory freedom of conscience and the right freely to practice religion so long as it is not a breach of public order and is not contrary to morality.

Article 22
Freedom of thought shall be guaranteed. Everyone shall have the right to express his opinion and to publish it by all means and methods. But this freedom may not be abused in any way which is contrary to public order and morality.

Article 23
Freedom of press and of printing shall be guaranteed within the limits of the law.

Article 24
Everyone shall be free to use any language in his private transactions or religious or cultural matters or in the Press or any other publications or in public meetings.

Article 25
The right of peaceful meetings is guaranteed within the limits of law.

Article 26
The right of peaceful associations shall be guaranteed. The exercise of that right shall be regulated by law.

Article 27
Individuals shall have the right to address public authorities by means of letters signed by them in connection with matters which concern them but only organised bodies or justice persons my address the authorities on behalf of a number of persons.

Article 28
Every Libyan shall have the right to education. The State shall ensure the diffusion of education by means of establishment of public schools and of private schools which it may permit to be established under its supervision, for Libyans and foreigners.

Article 29
Teaching shall be unrestricted so long as it does not constitute a breach of public order and is not contrary to morality. Public education shall be regulated by law.

Article 30
Elementary education shall be compulsory for Libyan children of both sexes; elementary and primary education in the public schools shall be free.

Article 31
Property shall be inviolable. No owner may be prevented from disposing of his property except within the limits of the law. No property of any person shall be expropriated except in the public interest and in the cases and in the manner determined by law and provided such person is awarded fair compensation.

Article 32
The penalty of general confiscation of property shall be prohibited.

Article 33
The family is the basis of society and shall be entitled to protection by the State. The State shall also protect and encourage marriage.

Article 34
Work is one of the basic elements of life. It shall be protected by the State and shall be the right of all Libyans. Every individual who works shall be entitled to fair remuneration.

Article 35
The State shall endeavour to provide as far as possible for every Libyan and his family an appropriate standard of living.

The Libyan National Assembly prepared and resolved this Constitution in its meeting held in the city of Benghazi on Sunday, 6th Muharram, Hegera 1371 corresponding to 7 October 1951, and delegated its president and the two vice-presidents to promulgate it and submit it to His Majesty, the Exalted King, and published in the Official Gazette in Libya. In pursuance of the Resolution of the National Assembly we have promulgated this Constitution in the city of Benghazi on Sunday, the 6th day of Muharram, Hegera 1371, corresponding to the 7th day of October 1951.

Mohamed Abulas'as El-Alem

President of the National Assembly

Omar Faiek Shennib

Vice-President of the National Assembly

Abubaker Ahmed Abubaker

Vice-President of the National Assembly

== Strengths and weaknesses ==
The Libyan Constitution contained many elements traditional to the regional, such as proclaiming Islam the religion of the State and setting out in detail the terms on which the hereditary monarchy should govern together with the procedure for succession. In particular, Articles 44 and 45 of the 1951 Constitution specify that the throne of the Kingdom of Libya is transmitted through male preference primogeniture, in line with the Libyan tradition codified by two Royal Orders promulgated on 22nd of Safar 1374 H. and the 25th of Rabi’e el-Thani 1376 H.

However, the charter also contain several provisions which entrenched the rights of its citizens to enjoy certain rights common to European and North American nation states, indicating the influence of the key western players in the region. Thus, while stopping short of a secular state (Article 5 proclaims Islam the religion) and while envisioning an inviolable Monarch (Article 59 exempts the King from all responsibility), the 1951 Constitution established a robust democratic apparatus and instituted solid mechanisms for the protection of human rights.

In particular, Chapter II (Rights of the People) of the Constitution of Libya set out rights such as equality before the law as well as equal civil and political rights, equal opportunities, and an equal responsibility for public duties and obligations, "without distinction of religion, belief, race, language, wealth, kinship or political or social opinions" (Article 11).

Many provisions appear to be in line with modern international standards for the protection of human rights, especially those pertaining to the right to recourse before the courts. Moreover, several profiles of the institutional apparatus established by the Constitution of Libya – particularly articles regulating the autonomy of the members of the Parliament in their legislative function (Art. 108), the independence of the judiciary (Art. 142), and procedures for overturning a veto by the King (Art. 136) – present elements of democracy.

Similarly, the accountability of ministers and public officers is guaranteed by Art. 90, 114, and 122. Art. 197 enshrines the representative form of the Libyan government and prohibits future amendments that could alter that nature.

The document sets out a parliamentary system based on universal adult suffrage and a Constitutional monarchy in which the King promulgates but cannot veto the Parliament’s acts. Nonetheless, the system of checks and balances among the branches of the Libyan government that the charter enshrines appears to be relatively weak, especially in light of the limited independence of the judiciary. Moreover, no detailed provision pertaining to democratic elections is available in the document.

Following the coup led by the Libyan army on September 1, 1969 and Idris's subsequent abdication, the Libyan Constitution ceased to have any direct applicability. Several actors, however, have asserted the enduring relevance of the 1951 Constitution.

== Enduring relevance ==
The document was received as a forward-thinking model of good governance for the region at the time it was released. Significantly, a paper produced in 2012 by Berlin-based independent NGO Democracy Reporting International emphasized that especially the constitutional provisions regarding the protection of human rights, transparency, and safeguards against antidemocratic power accumulations continue to make the charter an attractive document and an important reference point towards a solution to Libya’s political crisis.

Growing support on the ground in Libya for the idea that a return to the 1951 Constitution could best serve a transition to a unified and politically stable country was recorded since 2011. Grassroots campaigns promoted by groups devoted to the “Return of the Constitutional Legitimacy” developed in major cities across Libya – from Tripoli, to Zliten, to Benghazi, to Misrata – and gathered significant traction and following on social media.

Similar support to the restoration of the Constitution of Libya was voiced by several members of the Libyan committee responsible for drafting a new constitution, the so-called Constitution Drafting Assembly, in 2015 through an online petition. Then-Bayda Mayor Ali Hussain Bubaker wrote a letter to formally endorse the cause as well. Also in 2015 Cyrenaican party supporting federalist solutions, the National Federal Bloc, petitioned the Parliament to adopt the Constitution of Libya as a valid and legitimate charter for the entire country.

Growing support for the call for the reinstatement of the Constitution of Libya was also recorded by the international press, especially The National Interest in July 2014 and New York Times in February 2016. In June 2015, British Member of the Parliament Daniel Kawczynski publicly advocated for the return of the Constitution of Libya in response to the increasing support to the cause.

In parallel, the vast majority of the local supportive actors have called for the reinstatement of the Senussi monarchy under the leadership of Mohammed El Hassan El Rida El Senussi as part of the same political project.

When Gaddafi seized power on September 1, 1969, Crown Prince Hasan as-Senussi was acting as Regent on behalf of King Idris. He was arrested along with his family and many members of the extended royal household, isolated for years and publicly humiliated by the Gaddafi regime. When, in 1984, he was released from house arrest, he travelled to the UK to seek medical treatment after a stroke had seriously compromised his health. Before dying in 1992, he designated his second son, Prince Mohammed, as the legitimate heir to the Senussi Crown of Libya.

Notably, in April 2014 leading pan-Arab newspaper Al-Hayat published an interview with Mohamed Abdelaziz, who was then serving as Libya's Minister of Foreign Affairs, claiming that the reinstatement of the Constitutional Monarchy as regulated by the 1951 Constitution would serve as a "uniting symbol for the nation" as well as "a political umbrella" towards the institution of a regime with a two-council parliament and a technocratic government directed by a prime minister.

== 2017 proposed revival ==
After the Constituent Assembly of Libya voted by a two-thirds majority in favour of the 2017 draft Libyan constitution in July 2017, a proposal to revive the 1951 constitution was made. On October 31, 2017, nearly a thousand supporters gathered for the National Conference for the Activation of the Constitution of Independence in Gharyan, one of the largest towns in the Western Mountains. Supporters feel the return to the pre-Gaddafi political governance – a time of stability and unity in Libya – will help pull the country out of its enduring crisis.

Prince Mohammed El Senussi, the legitimate heir to the Libyan monarchy, was widely referenced during the event as the would-be leader of the Libyan people if the Constitution of 1951 is restored. Supporters called for Senussi to "assume all his constitutional powers and resume the constitutional life that the founding fathers created."

The conference was broadcast live on Libyan television, and attendees traveled from many various parts of the region, including Tripoli, Zliten, Benghazi, and Misrata, where grassroots movements advocating for “Return of the Constitutional Legitimacy” have gained momentum.

Ashraf Baoudoura, who coordinated the event, said similar conferences will be held in Beida, Jaghbub and Tobruk.

== See also ==
- Libyan interim Constitutional Declaration
- The Libyan Constitutional Union

== Bibliography ==
- Al-Ali, Zaid (2021-08-19). Arab Constitutionalism: The Coming Revolution. Cambridge University Press. p. 106. ISBN 978-1-108-42970-2.
