= Declaration on the Establishment of the Authority of the People =

1977 Libyan constitutional document

The Declaration on the Establishment of the Authority of the People (Arabic: إعلان قيام سلطة الشعب) was brought into force on 2 March 1977 by the General People's Congress, under the auspices of Muammar Gaddafi, in the name of the Arab people of the Libyan Arab Jamahiriya. The Declaration set the constitutional framework of the Libyan Arab Jamahiriya, and was considered part of its constitution alongside the Great Green Charter of Human Rights issued in 1988. This amendment to the constitutional proclamation of 1969 would remain in force until the adoption of the interim constitutional declaration on 3 August 2011 due to the overthrow of the Gaddafi government.

== Provisions ==
According to one translation, the Declaration recognises the Quran as the constitution of the Libyan Arab Jamahiriya (see below). However, in another translation the Declaration states that the Quran is the Sharia of society in the Jamahiriya.
