= 2000 Swiss referendums =

Fifteen referendums were held in Switzerland during 2000. The first five were held on 12 March on reforming the judiciary and four popular initiatives; "for speeding up direct democracy (time limits for the handling of popular initiatives)", "for a just representation of women in federal authorities", "for the protection of men against manipulations in procreation technology" and one to reduce motorised road by 50%. Whilst the judiciary reform was approved, all four popular initiatives were rejected. The next referendum was held on 21 May to authorise sectoral agreements between Switzerland and the European Union, and was approved by around two-thirds of voters.

The next set of four referendums was held on 24 September on a tax contribution for energy efficiency, as well as three popular initiatives; one for a tax contribution for promoting solar energy (alongside a counterproposal), as well as initiatives "for a regulation of immigration" and "more rights for people thanks to referendums with counter-proposals". Every proposal, including the counter-proposal, was rejected by voters. The final five referendums were held on 26 November on a law on federal employees and four popular initiatives; "for a flexible retirement age for men and women from 62 years on", "economising on military and defence–for more peace and seminal jobs", "for lower hospital expenses" and one against raising the female retirement age. Whilst the federal law was approved, all four popular initiatives were rejected.

== Results ==
Month	Question	For		Against		Blank/invalid		Total	Registered voters	Turnout	Cantons for		Cantons against	
Month	Question	Votes	%	Votes	%	Blank	Invalid	Total	Registered voters	Turnout	Full	Half	Full	Half
March	Judicial reform	1,610,107	86.4	254,355	13.6	80,905	7,861	1,953,228	4,659,124	41.9	20	6	0	0
March	Popular initiative on speeding up direct democracy	573,038	30.0	1,336,916	70.0	44,268	7,483	1,961,705	4,659,124	42.1	0	0	20	6
March	Popular initiative on women in federal authorities	346,314	18.0	1,580,859	82.0	31,355	7,013	1,965,541	4,659,124	42.2	0	0	20	6
March	Popular initiative on procreation technology	539,795	28.2	1,371,372	71.8	47,594	7,407	1,966,168	4,659,124	42.2	0	0	20	6
March	Popular initiative on halving motorised road traffic	415,605	21.3	1,532,518	78.7	19,419	6,988	1,974,530	4,659,124	42.4	0	0	20	6
May	Sectoral agreements with the EU	1,497,093	67.2	730,980	32.8	16,317	8,894	2,253,284	4,664,482	48.3				
September	Popular initiative on promoting solar energy^{[a]}	636,848	31.3	1,364,751	67.0	42,981	10,311	2,090,548	4,676,482	44.7	0	0	20	6
September	Counter-proposal on solar energy^{[a]}	922,481	45.3	1,055,977	51.8	42,981	10,311	2,090,548	4,676,482	44.7	4	1	16	5
September	Tax contribution for energy efficiency	898,050	44.5	1,119,697	55.5	72,418	9,160	2,099,325	4,676,482	44.9	2	1	18	5
September	Popular initiative on regulating immigration	754,626	36.2	1,330,224	63.8	23,232	8,971	2,117,053	4,676,482	45.3	0	0	20	6
September	Popular initiative on referendum with counter-proposal	676,776	34.1	1,308,030	65.9	101,274	9,433	2,095,513	4,676,482	44.8	0	0	20	6
November	Popular initiative on retirement age for women	756,337	39.5	1,159,794	60.5	27,527	6,650	1,950,308	4,681,043	41.7	6	0	14	6
November	Popular initiative on flexible retirement age	885,772	46.0	1,038,985	54.0	21,625	6,384	1,952,766	4,681,043	41.7	7	0	13	6
November	Popular initiative on economising on military and defence	723,047	37.6	1,198,923	62.4	24,339	6,456	1,952,765	4,681,043	41.7	4	0	16	6
November	Popular initiative on lower hospital expenses	343,008	17.9	1,574,528	82.1	20,015	6,631	1,950,182	4,681,043	41.7	0	0	20	6
November	Law on federal employees	1,253,995	66.8	622,381	33.2	60,698	7,148	1,944,222	4,681,043	41.5				
Source: Nohlen & Stöver

=== EU bilateral treaty referendum results by canton ===
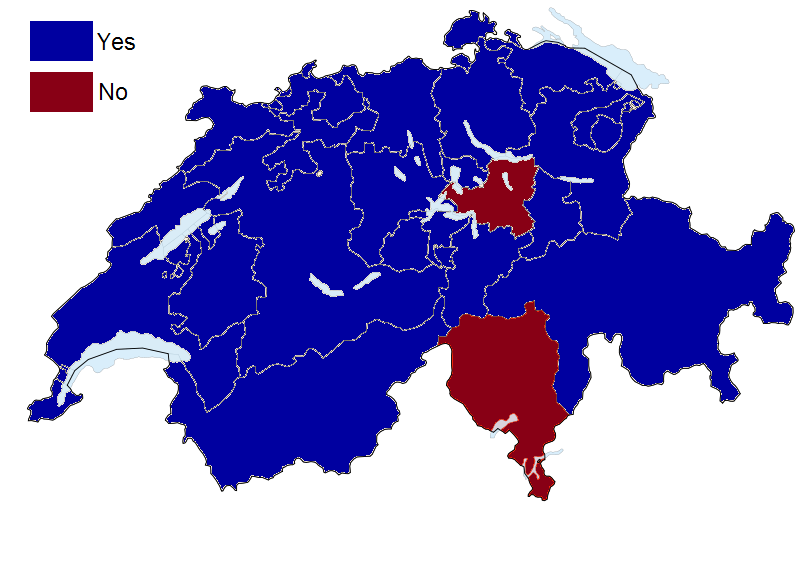
Swiss EU bilateral treaty referendum results by canton Yes-votes No-votes

Canton	Yes	No	Electorate	Votes	Valid votes	Invalid votes
Vaud	133,336	32,669	366,235	167,828	166,005	1,823
Valais	49,540	26,022	183,539	76,522	75,562	960
Genève	94,597	25,530	209,614	121,564	120,127	1,437
Bern	204,882	94,445	675,852	301,277	299,327	1,950
Freiburg	52,533	17,886	157,996	71,063	70,419	644
Solothurn	53,686	26,909	163,512	81,055	80,595	460
Neuchâtel	42,805	11,117	104,572	54,593	53,922	671
Jura	17,416	5,115	47,923	22,727	22,531	196
Basel-Stadt	47,128	18,050	119,894	65,692	65,178	514
Basel-Landschaft	59,983	24,583	175,700	85,511	84,566	945
Aargau	93,325	56,702	352,338	150,740	150,027	713
Zürich	275,570	118,423	785,473	399,856	393,993	5,863
Glarus	6,643	4,974	24,558	11,674	11,617	57
Schaffhausen	18,645	11,841	48,137	31,807	30,486	1,321
Appenzell Ausserrhoden	11,886	7,262	35,622	19,257	19,148	109
Appenzell Innerrhoden	2,421	2,246	10,032	4,680	4,667	13
St.Gallen	79,227	46,136	284,281	125,947	125,363	584
Graubünden	30,170	21,307	127,989	52,218	51,477	741
Thurgau	36,569	27,411	141,611	65,237	63,980	1,257
Luzern	78,402	46,745	231,627	126,718	125,147	1,571
Uri	6,730	6,149	25,440	13,150	12,879	271
Schwyz	20,865	21,068	85,133	43,179	41,933	1,246
Obwalden	5,839	4,677	22,206	10,631	10,516	115
Nidwalden	8,119	6,415	26,957	14,802	14,534	268
Zug	24,199	10,752	64,691	35,116	34,951	165
Ticino	42,577	56,546	193,550	100,440	99,123	1,317

^{a} In the referendum with a counter-proposal, voters had the option of not answering. A total of 35,657 voters (1.8%) did not answer the solar energy question, whilst 58,798 (2.9%) did not answer the counter-proposal.
