= 1965 Libyan general election =

- 8 May 1965

Early general elections were held in Libya on 8 May 1965 to elect members of the House of Representatives, the lower house of Parliament, following the dissolution of parliament by King Idris after the 1964 elections. As political parties were banned, all candidates ran as independents. In order to ensure the victory of pro-government candidates, ballot boxes were tampered with by police.
