= Parliament of the Kingdom of Libya =

Bicameral legislature of the Kingdom of Libya

Parliament of Libya

Type
- Type: Bicameral
- Houses: Senate and House of Representatives

History
- Founded: 1951
- Disbanded: 1969
- Succeeded by: Abolished

Elections
- Last House of Representatives election: 1968

The Parliament of the Kingdom of Libya was the bicameral legislature of the Kingdom of Libya from 1951 to 1969. It consisted of the lower house, the House of Representatives, and the upper house, Senate. The legislature was established in the 1951 Constitution, and abolished following the 1969 coup d'état by Muammar Gaddafi.

== Senate ==
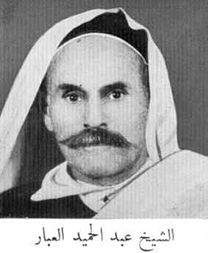
Senate President Abdul Hamid Abbar

The Senate was the upper house of the parliament. Initially there were 24 senators, eight of each of the three provinces of Libya. Half of the senators were appointed by the King of Libya, the other half were chosen by provincial legislative assemblies. After 1963, when the King abolished the federal system, the King appointed all senators. The term of senators was eight years. The Senate was led by a president appointed for two-year terms.

=== Senate Presidents ===
- Mahmoud Bu Hedma, ?-1959-1960-?
- Abdul Hamid Abbar, 1961-1968-?

== House of Representatives ==
The House of Representatives was the elected lower chamber. The members were elected by secret ballot in general elections. In 1960, the house had 55 members divided among the three provinces: Tripolitania had 35 seats, Cyrenaica 15, and Fezzan 5. In 1968, 99 members were elected. Seven elections took place to the House of Representatives: 1952, 1955, 1960, 1964, 1965, 1967 and 1968. The House was led by a speaker.

=== Presidents of the House of Representatives ===
- Abdul Majid Kubar, 1952-?
- Salim al-Qadi, 1957-1960
- Muftah Areghib,?-1964-1965
- Salim al-Qadi, March - October 1965
- Muftah Areghib, ?-1968-?

== See also ==
- Kingdom of Libya
- 1952 Libyan general election
- 1956 Libyan general election
- 1960 Libyan general election
- 1964 Libyan general election
- 1965 Libyan general election
- 1967 Libyan general election
- 1968 Libyan general election
