= Constitution of Libya (1969) =

The 1969 Libyan Constitutional Proclamation (also translated as a Constitutional Declaration) was brought into force on December 11, 1969, by the Revolutionary Command Council, in the name of the Arab people of the Libyan Arab Republic. The proclamation would remain in force until the adoption of the interim constitution on August 3, 2011.

== Provisions ==
The declaration legally established the Revolutionary Command Council as the supreme executive and legislative authority in the country. The declaration was to remain in force until the completion of the "Nationalist Democratic Revolution", when it would be replaced by a permanent constitution. However, this never occurred, and the declaration was eventually suspended and replaced by another interim constitutional declaration after the 2011 Libyan civil war.

== See also ==
- Declaration on the Establishment of the Authority of the People
