= Constituent Assembly of Libya =

The Constituent Assembly of Libya or Constitution Drafting Assembly is the chamber responsible for writing a new constitution for Libya in the post-Gaddafi era. It was elected on 20 February 2014 and began work on 22 April with Ali Tarhouni as its president.

== Drafting work in 2014 ==
The assembly sits in Bayda in eastern Libya. A city outside of Tripoli was specifically chosen to have a say in running the country in addition to helping to weaken eastern independence movements, such as the one led by Ibrahim Jadhran.

Six seats were not originally elected but elections for two of them took place on 4 May, including one minority seat for the Tuaregs.

The assembly was designed to be strictly non-partisan in order to transcend the political divide in Libyan politics. By 25 May 2014, internal laws on the procedure and committees for specific articles of the constitution had been decided upon, along with a 'blueprint' which represented the composition of the constitution. Tarhouni confirmed that the assembly would not have a political role; he stated that it would be "only devoted to drafting the constitution"

== 2017 final draft ==
The assembly voted with a two-thirds majority for a final draft in July 2017.
