= 2014 Swiss referendums =

National referendums held in Switzerland in 2014

Twelve national referendums were held in Switzerland during 2014.

== February referendums ==
Three referendums were held on 9 February on abortion, immigration and the rail network. The abortion referendum proposed that abortions would no longer be funded through health insurance, but should be paid for privately by the mother.

The anti-immigration proposal was supported by the Swiss People's Party, and opposes the free movement of workers between the EU and Switzerland, which was introduced following a 2000 referendum.

The rail network proposal combined a number of existing federal and cantonal funds into a single permanent rail infrastructure fund, and defined a programme of upgrade projects of about 42 billion francs over 40 years, with a mechanism for the federal council to present regular updates to the programme. The initial programme includes a number of speed increases to intercity rail routes and S-Bahn expansion around Bern, Basel, and Geneva.

=== Results ===
The abortion referendum, which would have dropped abortion coverage from public health insurance, failed by a large margin, with about 70% of participating voters rejecting the proposal.

The immigration restriction proposal passed by a narrow margin, with 50.3% of participating voters supporting the measure; the proposal was also approved by the required majority of cantons. The immigration measure requires the Swiss government to either renegotiate the Swiss-EU agreement of free movement of people within three years, or to revoke the agreement. The proposal mandates re-introduction of strict quotas for various immigration categories, and imposes limits on the ability of foreigners to bring in their family members to live in Switzerland, to access Swiss social security benefits, and to request asylum. Opinion polls ahead of the vote showed the lead for the opponents of the immigration measure, but that lead began to close as the day of the referendum approached.

The referendum on public rail passed with 62% of votes in favour.

Question	For		Against		Invalid/ blank	Total votes	Registered voters	Turnout	Cantons for		Cantons against		Result
Question	Votes	%	Votes	%	Invalid/ blank	Total votes	Registered voters	Turnout	Full	Half	Full	Half	Result
Abortion initiative	873,060	30.2	2,019,549	69.8	47,558	2,940,167	5,211,426	56.42	0	1	20	5	Rejected
"Against mass immigration"	1,463,854	50.3	1,444,552	49.7	39,750	2,948,156	5,211,426	56.57	12	5	8	1	Accepted
Financing and development of railway infrastructure	1,776,878	62.0	1,088,176	38.0	65,723	2,930,777	5,211,426	56.24	19	6	1	0	Accepted
Source: Government of Switzerland, Government of Switzerland, Government of Switzerland

=== Aftermath ===
Shortly after the Swiss voted in February 2014 in favour of tighter controls on immigration, the Swiss government informed the EU and Croatia that it was unable to sign a protocol to its agreement with the European Commission that would have automatically extended this agreement to the new EU member state. Giving Croatian citizens unrestricted access to the Swiss job market would have been incompatible with the ‘yes’ vote on the ‘stop mass immigration’ referendum. As this decision flew in the face of one of the EU's four guiding principles, the freedom of movement (the other three being the free movement of goods, services and capital), the European Commission retaliated by excluding Switzerland from research programmes potentially worth hundreds of millions of euros for its universities and suspended negotiations on Switzerland's participation as a full member in the world's largest and best-funded research and innovation programme, the almost €80 billion Horizon 2020. The European Commission also suspended Switzerland from the Erasmus student exchange programme. According to the ATS news agency, some 2 600 Swiss students took advantage of Erasmus in 2011 and Switzerland played host that same year to about 2 900 foreign students within the same EU-funded programme.

Thanks to intense diplomatic activity behind the scenes and fruitful bilateral discussions, Switzerland was granted a temporary reprieve, allowing it to participate in Excellent Science, the central pillar of Horizon 2020. This entitled Swiss universities to benefit from grants offered by the European Research Council and by the Future and Emerging Technologies programme, among other instruments, up until the end of 2016.

On 22 December 2016, the Swiss parliament adopted a bill that gave priority to Swiss nationals and foreigners registered in Swiss job agencies but avoided introducing quotas on EU citizens. The EU approved the law, putting an end to the almost three-year crisis.

== May referendums ==
Four referendums were held in Switzerland on 18 May 2014. An initiative on minimum wage proposed that the government should promote the adoption of minimum wages in collective agreements, and set a national minimum wage of 22 francs an hour, which would have been the highest minimum wage in the world. The other referendums included changes to primary health care, a lifetime ban on convicted pedophiles working with children, and the procurement of the JAS 39 Gripen fighter aircraft.

=== Results ===
Question	For		Against		Invalid/ blank	Total votes	Registered voters	Turnout	Cantons for		Cantons against		Result
Question	Votes	%	Votes	%	Invalid/ blank	Total votes	Registered voters	Turnout	Full	Half	Full	Half	Result
JAS 39 Gripen procurement	1,345,726	46.59	1,542,761	53.41	52,649	2,941,136	5,221,519	56.33					Rejected
Minimum wage	687,571	23.73	2,210,192	76.27	45,152	2,942,915	5,221,519	56.36	0	0	20	6	Rejected
Primary health care	2,480,870	88.07	336,196	11.93	98,927	2,915,993	5,221,519	55.85	20	6	0	0	Accepted
Restrictions on paedophiles	1,819,822	63.53	1,044,704	36.47	68,733	2,933,259	5,221,519	56.18	20	6	0	0	Accepted
Source: Government of Switzerland

== September referendums ==
Two referendums were held on 28 September, with voters asked whether they supported the creation of a unified health insurance fund and the "End to VAT discrimination in the hospitality industry" popular initiative. The health insurance proposal was supported by the Social Democratic Party and the Green Party, together with several user and consumer organisations. The VAT initiative was launched by GastroSuisse, and sought to reduce the level of VAT paid in restaurants from the standard 8% to 2.5%, the same level paid at food stands. However, the Federal Council and the Federal Assembly both opposed the proposal, claiming it would reduce tax take by around CHF 750 million.

Both proposals were rejected by voters.

=== Results ===
Question	For		Against		Invalid/ blank	Total votes	Registered voters	Turnout	Cantons for		Cantons against		Result
Question	Votes	%	Votes	%	Invalid/ blank	Total votes	Registered voters	Turnout	Full	Half	Full	Half	Result
Unified health insurance fund	933,012	38.2	1,512,036	61.8	27,247	2,472,295	5,240,533	47.2	4	0	16	6	Rejected
Hospitality industry VAT initiative	684,563	28.5	1,718,827	71.5	57,419	2,460,809	5,240,533	47.0	0	0	20	6	Rejected
Source: Government of Switzerland, Government of Switzerland

== November referendums ==
A further three referendums were held on 30 November on the country's gold reserves, abolishing the flat tax and limiting immigration. All three were rejected by voters.

The gold reserves proposal would have required the Swiss National Bank to have gold reserves of at least 20% of the value of the assets of the Swiss National Bank, and see all Swiss gold currently held in the Federal Reserve Bank of New York returned to Switzerland. The popular initiative was started by Swiss People's Party MP Luzi Stamm and two other MPs, with the 100,000 signatures required for a referendum obtained by early 2013. The proposal was opposed by the Swiss National Bank and the Swiss government, as it would limit the SNB's ability to print money.

The flat tax abolition proposal called for residents and non-working foreigners to be taxed based only on their income and their assets, whilst the immigration cap proposal put forward by Ecopop called for preserving natural resources by limiting immigration to Switzerland to 0.2% of the population per year.

=== Results ===
Question	For		Against		Invalid/ blank	Total votes	Registered voters	Turnout	Cantons for		Cantons against		Result
Question	Votes	%	Votes	%	Invalid/ blank	Total votes	Registered voters	Turnout	Full	Half	Full	Half	Result
Gold reserves	580,528	22.7	1,974,137	77.3	59,235	2,613,900	5,247,489	49.8	0	0	20	6	Rejected
Immigration cap	671,099	25.9	1,920,454	74.1	31,147	2,622,700	5,247,489	50.0	0	0	20	6	Rejected
Flat tax abolition	1,053,125	40.8	1,528,114	59.2	37,529	2,618,768	5,247,489	49.9	1	0	19	6	Rejected
Source: Government of Switzerland

== Sources ==
This article incorporates text from a free content work. Licensed under CC-BY-SA IGO 3.0. Text taken from UNESCO Science Report: towards 2030, UNESCO.

== See also ==
- 2026 No to ten million Switzerland initiative
