= 2017 draft Libyan constitution =

Proposed constitution of Libya

The 2017 draft Libyan constitution is a draft of a constitution for Libya prepared by the Constitution Drafting Assembly of 60 people elected from around Libya in the 2014 Libyan Constitutional Assembly election. The new draft constitution was not adopted.

== Background ==
Following the overthrow of the Gaddafi government in the Libyan Civil War, the Libyan interim Constitutional Declaration was published by the Libyan National Transitional Council in August 2011, intended as a temporary constitution until a permanent one could be agreed upon.

== Constitution Drafting Assembly ==
The High National Election Commission (HNEC) organised the 2014 Libyan Constitutional Assembly election of 60 representatives in February 2014, 20 from each of the Tripolitania, Cyrenaica and Fezzan regions of Libya. The group of 60 people became known as the Constituent Assembly of Libya or Constitution Drafting Assembly.

== Draft Constitution ==
In July 2017, the Constitution Drafting Assembly voted by a two-thirds majority in favour of a final draft constitution. The draft constitution defines a presidential system of government, with strong powers given to the president.

=== Presidential dominance ===
Article 100 provides for direct popular election of the president. Article 104(1) gives the president full power to choose a government. Article 113 empowers the president to choose the prime minister arbitrarily without being constrained by members of parliament or the political party with a parliamentary majority. Under Article 115, parliament requires a two-thirds majority to withdraw confidence from the government. Under Article 104(2), government policy is decided by the president, and implemented by the government. Zaid al-Ali interpreted Articles 67 and 109 to together "assume that it is parliament's responsibility to fall into line with the president".

=== Wealth redistribution ===
Zaid al-Ali interpreted Chapters 8 and 9 of the draft constitution to lead to concentration of wealth in the hands of the president, including the control of natural resources.

=== Security services ===
Zaid al-Ali judged the lack of definition of intelligence services or constraints on their activities in the draft constitution risked the creation of multiple intelligence agencies with no civilian oversight. He judged the definitions of military and police hierarchies to have "serious problems with the chain of command".

=== States of emergency ===
Al-Ali viewed the 120-day limit on a state of emergency defined in the draft constitution as positive, "in keeping with [the] trend" of other post-2011 Arab constitutions. He expressed concern that parliament's approval is not required before a presidential declaration of a state of emergency comes into effect (as in the Iraqi constitution, as of 2017).

=== Judiciary ===
Al-Ali judged the judiciary (in Articles including 118, 120, 125, 135 and 136) to be defined with a fair degree of independence from the president, but with a flaw in ambiguity regarding the membership and decision-making methods of the high judicial council.

=== Human rights ===
Al-Ali viewed the human rights elements of the draft constitution to lack details of how they would be enforced in courts in practice. He commended the "limitations clause" in Article 65, which limits state authorities from restricting any of the human rights declared in the constitution unless the restriction is "necessary, clear, limited, and proportional with the restrictions' objectives". According to al-Ali, only two other Arab countries at the time had this limitation (Tunisia, Article 49, and Yemen's draft constitution).

=== Elections ===
Article 157 of the draft constitution states that the HNEC is responsible for organising elections.

== Support and opposition ==
The Constitution Drafting Assembly (CDA) presented the draft to the House of Representatives (HoR) for endorsement. In February 2018, the HoR rejected the CDA's draft constitution and called instead to develop an amendment of the 1951 Constitution of the Kingdom of Libya. Earlier in February 2018, a legal case against the validity of the draft constitution proceeded to a hearing by the Supreme Court, which dismissed lower courts' decisions against the draft.
