= 2014 South African presidential election =

- 21 May 2014

400 votes in the National Assembly 201 votes needed to win
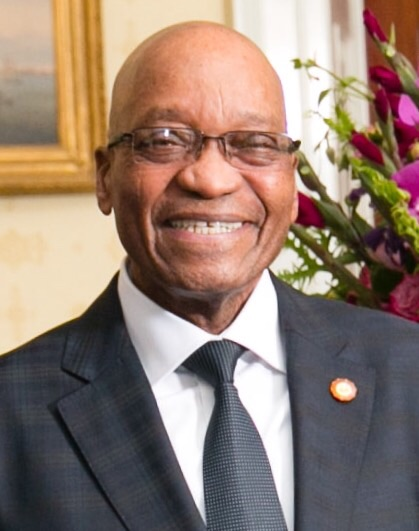
Nominee	Jacob Zuma
Party	ANC
Electoral vote	Unopposed
President before election
Jacob Zuma
ANC
Elected President
Jacob Zuma
ANC

An indirect presidential election occurred in South Africa on 21 May 2014. This came in response to the general election on 7 May 2014 where the African National Congress (ANC) received a reduced majority of 62.15% of the vote, gaining them 249 seats in the National Assembly. As required by the 1996 South African Constitution, a president must be elected by the National Assembly within 30 days following a general election. The ANC used their majority to re-elect Jacob Zuma in Parliament. He was re-inaugurated as the President of South Africa on 24 May 2014.
