= Fatimah el-Sharif =

Queen consort of Libya

Fatimah as-Senussi
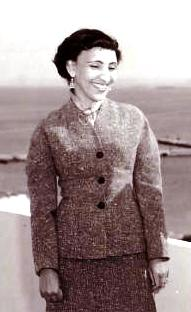
- Queen Fatima in the 1950s

Queen consort of Libya
- Tenure: 24 December 1951 – 1 September 1969
- Born: 2 April 1911; Oasis of Kufra, Ottoman Tripolitania
- Died: 3 October 2009 (aged 98); Cairo, Egypt
- Burial: Hamza Cemetery, Medina, Saudi Arabia
- Spouse: Idris I of Libya (m. 1931; died 1983)
- House: Senussi
- Father: Ahmed Sharif as-Senussi
- Religion: Sunni Islam

Sayyida Fatimah el-Sharif (Arabic: فاطمة الشريف), after marriage Fatimah as-Senussi (فاطمة السنوسي, 2 April 1911 – 3 October 2009), was Queen of Libya as the wife of King Idris from 1951 until the 1969 Libyan coup d'état.

== Early life ==
Fatimah el-Sharif was born in Italian Cyrenaica in 1911 as the fifth daughter of Ahmed Sharif as-Senussi, the former chief (3rd) of the Senussi order of Sufism. Her father was active in resistance against colonial forces. Her mother Khadija, Ahmed Sharif's second wife, was a daughter of general Ahmad al-Rifi (d. on 3 September 1911 in Kufra), distinguished elder statesman of the brotherhood and the last surviving personal companion of the Grand Senussi.

In 1929, she was forced to flee on camel to Egypt from Marshal Rodolfo Graziani.

In 1931, she married her cousin Idris of Libya, then Emir of Cyrenaica and her father's successor, in Siwa Oasis. Their only son died in 1953, aged one day old.

== Queenship ==
Upon her husband's accession as King of Libya in 1951, Fatimah became Queen.

In 1954, her nephew assassinated Idris' advisor Ibrahim al-Shelhi because of a rumour that Shelhi had convinced the King to divorce Fatima in favour of a marriage with his own daughter. Idris then ordered the execution of Fatima's nephew. Salah Busir, who would later be Libya's foreign minister, sent a letter to Elizabeth II asking her to convince Idris to stop the execution, but he was unsuccessful. When Idris decided to obey the demands to remarry in order to have an heir, Fatimah selected two women as prospective brides. He chose neither of them, but instead an Egyptian woman appointed by his premier, Alia Abdel Kader Lamloum, whom he married in 1955. As there was no divorce, Fatimah refused to leave the royal residence in Tobruk. After a couple of months, she and Idris reconciled.

The relationship between Queen Fatimah and King Idris is described as a mutually happy one. They became foster-parents to several children of relatives. They also became the adoptive parents of their Algerian daughter Suleima, whose father had been killed fighting against France in Algeria's war of independence.

Fatimah was described as humorous and tactful, with an ability to make people relax, especially children. She also was a most loyal supporter of Idris. As queen, Fatimah also became a role model for the women of Libya in her role as queen.

In 1954, queen Fatimah was interviewed in her small private palace in Benghazi by the journalist Nel Slis, who described her as an elegant and imposing woman dressed in the fashion of Christian Dior, and who spoke to her with her lady-in-waiting Selma Dajani as interpreter, since she could only understand a little English. Nel Slis noted that queen Fatimah had not lived a secluded life in her youth but been allowed to mix with men and play tennis dressed in shorts, but that as queen, she had been forced to live a life secluded in her private palace in Benghazi, and did not appear in public in Libya:

"She spoke of the future possibility for the emancipation of Libyan women. Instead of playing tennis in shorts, she is currently obliged by her royal rank to go back many centuries and live the life of seclusion... of 99 percent of Libyan women. Only if she goes abroad does the queen live like a western woman, dressed in European clothes, and then a visit to a fashion show or to the Folies Bergere in Paris – where she has indeed been – fashinates her just as much as any other women in the world. [...] Having to dress in the barracan is perhaps harder for her than for all her Libyan sisters, in view of the fact that she knows the freedom of the west."

The queen spoke of her visits to Europe, expressed her wish to visit the United States, and stated that she believed that women would eventually reach a more liberated role in Libya:

"Queen Fatima however believes that Libyan women will make important progress in the subsequent generation on the road to freedom. They will be able to study and go abroad. [...] "it will be a slow and gradual process before the Libyan women attain emancipation", she told me, "But the Libyan girls are very much longing to learn and to win their freedom".

== Post-revolution and death ==
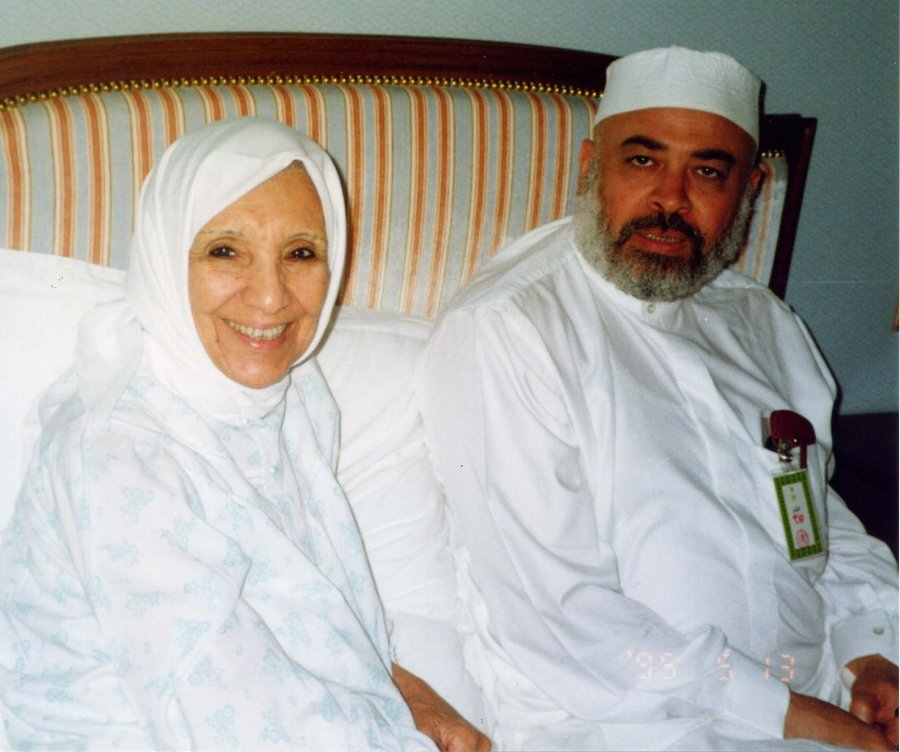
Fatima el-Sharif with Mohamed Ben-Ghalbon in Cairo, 1995

Fatimah was in Turkey with her spouse at the time of Muammar Gaddafi's coup in 1969.

With the help of the Turkish government they returned from the resort town of Borsa to Kanmena Yourla in Greece. On 13 September she wrote to their lifetime friend Eric Armar Vully de Candole, CBE, who held the post of British Resident, Cyrenaica: "We could not answer your cables and letters as I was alone with my husband when the coup took place without any money at all until the Turkish Government came to our help, paid our hotel and arranged our journey to Greece." She wrote to de Candole again on 26 October: "The weather here is cold and Ramadan will soon start and we cannot perform fasting obligations in any European Country. It is the will of God and may it be for the benefits of all. We shall sail next Friday for Alexandria and the same day get to Cairo."

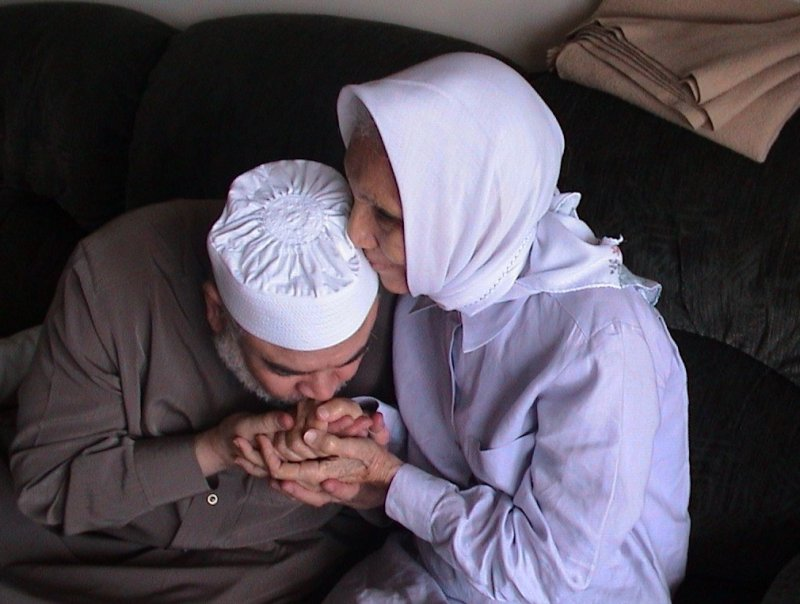
Fatima el-Sharif with Mohamed Ben-Ghalbon in Cairo, 2003

She subsequently lived in Cairo from 3 November 1969 until her death. Fatimah was later tried in absentia by the Libyan People's Court and sentenced in November 1971 to five years in prison and seizure of her assets. Her house in Tripoli was returned to her in 2007.

Fatimah died on 3 October 2009 in Cairo, aged 98. Her body was flown to Saudi Arabia for burial at Al-Baqi' in Medina beside her husband and her father accompanied by her longtime companions and servants Nafa al-Arabi al-Senussi, his wife Alia Benghalbon, and her longtime friend Amina Darbi.

Saudi Arabia denied her family permission to bury her in Al-Baqi'. Her body was finally laid to rest in the Hamza Cemetery near Mount Uhud in Medina on 7 October 2009 after salat al-Janazah in al-Masjid an-Nabawi.

== Gallery ==
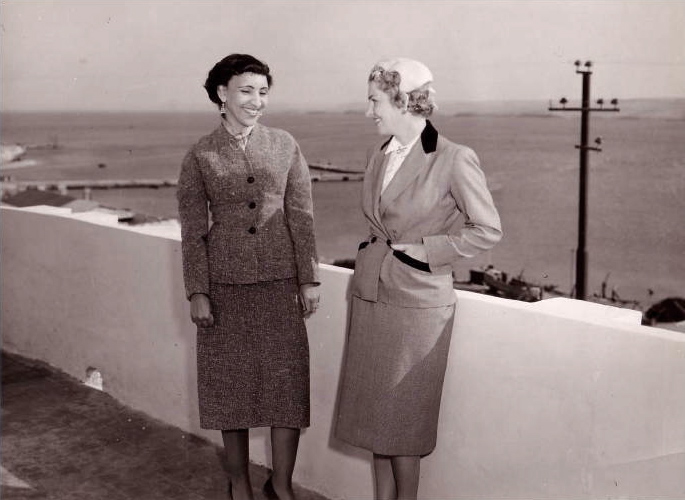
Queen Fatima of Libya with Helena Maria Tappin, wife of U.S. Ambassador to Libya John L. Tappin.

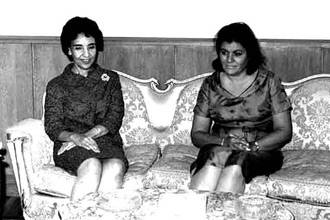
Queen Fatimah (left) on a visit to Egypt with Tahia Kazem, First Lady of Egypt

Fatimah el-Sharif Senussi dynasty Born: 1911 Died: 3 October 2009
Regnal titles
New title New state created	Queen consort of Libya; 24 December 1951 – 1 September 1969	Vacant Monarchy abolished
