= 2014 Northern Cypriot constitutional referendum =

- 29 June 2014

Results
Choice	Votes	%
Yes	42,288	37.68%
No	69,952	62.32%
Valid votes	112,240	91.52%
Invalid or blank votes	10,402	8.48%
Total votes	122,642	100.00%
Registered voters/turnout	175,258	69.98%

A constitutional referendum was held in Northern Cyprus on 29 June 2014. The proposed changes were rejected by 62% of voters.

== Background ==
On 5 June 2014 the Assembly of the Republic approved changes to 23 articles of the constitution. The proposed amendments, which would have been the first since the constitution was promulgated in 1985, were published in the state's official journal on 12 June. They included lifting the ban on civil servants joining a political party, requiring elected MPs to declare their family's wealth, children's rights, and freedom of communication.

Article 162 of the constitution required that any changes are put to a referendum. This was held alongside local elections on 29 June.

== Results ==
Choice	Votes	%
For	42,288	37.68
Against	69,952	62.32
Invalid/blank votes	10,402	–
Total	122,642	100
Registered voters/turnout	175,258	69.98
Source: Direct Democracy
