= 2014 Slovenian archives law referendum =

- 8 June 2014
- Are you in favor of the Act on Amendments and Supplements to the Act on the Protection of Documentary and Archival Material and Archives (ZVDAGA-A), adopted by the National Assembly at its session on January 28, 2014?

Results
Choice	Votes	%
Yes	64,571	32.63%
No	133,347	67.37%
Valid votes	197,918	98.44%
Invalid or blank votes	3,129	1.56%
Total votes	201,047	100.00%
Registered voters/turnout	1,712,733	11.74%

A referendum on the archive law was held in Slovenia on 8 June 2014. Voters were asked whether they were in favor of the amendments to the law that were passed in January 2014. The amendments were rejected by 67% of voters, although the referendum was invalidated by "no" voters accounting for only 7.79% of all registered voters, well below the 20% quorum.

== Background ==
The referendum was initiated by Eva Irgl, an MP for the Slovenian Democratic Party (SDS), following a decision by the National Assembly on 28 January 2014 to amend the law on the national archives. The amendment would result in the anonymisation of personal data of people working for and victims of the Yugoslav-era secret services. The party collected over 40,000 signatures, enough to force a referendum.

The referendum was originally set to be held on 4 May following a decree in the National Assembly. However, the SDS appealed to the Supreme Court, claiming that the date was inappropriate, as early voting would coincide with the May Day public holiday. The appeal was unanimously upheld by the Court, who ordered the National Assembly to set a new date within seven days. The Court also ruled against the National Assembly claim that the referendum could not be held in parallel with the European Parliament elections on 25 May. This date had been favoured by the referendum's initiators, as a constitutional amendment in 2012 had introduced new quorum requirement requiring a minimum turnout for a law to be rejected. The Constitution states that a law is rejected in a referendum if a majority of voters who have cast valid votes vote against the law, provided at least one fifth of all qualified voters have voted against.

On 24 April the National Assembly approved holding the referendum on 8 June. The SDS claimed it would challenge the new date in the Supreme Court.

== Results ==
Choice	Votes	Votes %	Turnout %
For	64,571	32.63	3.77
Against	133,347	✓ 67.37	7.79
Total valid votes	197,918	100	11.56
Invalid/blank votes	3,129		0.18
Total votes cast	201,047		✗ 11.74
Registered voters	1,712,733		100
Source: Government of Slovenia

Although a majority of voters who cast valid votes voted against the law, the second constitutional requirement that at least one-fifth of all qualified voters have voted against the law was not met.
