= Next Libyan referendum =

A constitutional referendum is to be held in Libya after the country's new constitution has been drawn up by a constituent assembly. The expected date for the publication of the constitution was December 2014, but this was delayed because of the ongoing conflict in the country. A General National Congress was elected in July 2012, originally charged with organising constituent assembly elections; however, the National Transitional Council decided that Libyans will instead directly elect the constituent assembly. The General National Congress came to agreement on 10 April 2013 that constituent assembly members will be elected.

The referendum was revived in early 2021 as Libyans agreed to hold it before the presidential and parliamentary elections. Despite the House of Representatives insisting that the referendum take place first, it eventually was delayed until after the Next Libyan presidential election.
