= 1960 Libyan general election =

- 17 January 1960
- All 55 seats in the House of Representatives
Party	Vote %	Seats	+/–
Independents	100	55	0
This lists parties that won seats. See the complete results below.
Prime Minister before	Prime Minister after
Abdul Majid Kabar	Abdul Majid Kabar

General elections were held in Libya on 17 January 1960 to elect the members of the House of Representatives, the lower house of Parliament.

== Conduct ==
The country was divided into 55 constituencies for the election. The majority of constituencies were contested by two or more candidates, although as political parties were banned at the time, all candidates were independents. It was the first election in which secret balloting was used nationwide, as previously it had been confined to urban areas.

== Results ==
Prime Minister Abdul Majid Kabar and all other ministers were re-elected, but the Speaker of the House Salim al-Qadi lost his seat. Following the elections, al-Qadi was appointed Minister of Education, replacing Bubakir Naama, who became Governor of Tripolitania. Ahmed al-Hasairi replaced Ibrahim Bin Shaban as Minister of Defence, whilst Bin Shaban was appointed as "Ambassador at large". Minister of Economics Rajab Bin Katu became Minister of Health, swapping portfolios with Mohammed Bin Othman. Abd al-Hamid Daibani remained Minister of Justice, Nasr al-Kizza remained Minister of Communications and Wahbi al-Bouri remained Minister of State.
