= 2014 Liechtenstein pensions referendum =

| 15 June 2014 |

Pensionskasse Win-Win
| For | 43.9% |
| Against | 56.1% |
Proposal rejected

Win-Win 50
| For | 49.7% |
| Against | 50.3% |
Proposal rejected

Preference vote
| Win-Win 50 | 80.6% |
| Pensionskasse Win-Win | 19.4% |
Both proposals rejected by overall vote
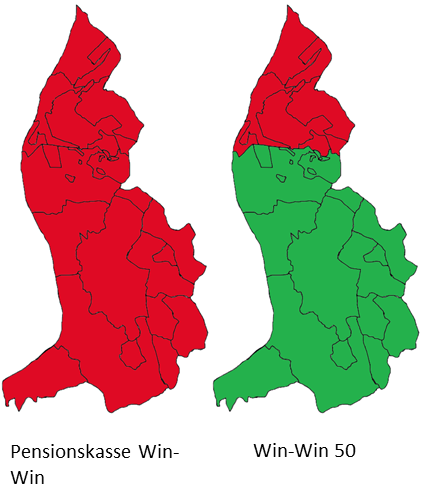
- Results by municipality

A referendum on a law on public sector pensions was held in Liechtenstein on 15 June 2014.

== Results ==
Of the two initiatives submitted to the referendum, the so-called "Pension win-win" proposed that the state treasury contribute 90 million Swiss francs to the pension fund. The other initiative, called "Win-win 50", proposed 50 million Swiss francs contribution from the state treasury. Neither initiative was passed.

| Question | For | | Against | | Invalid/ blank votes | Total | Registered voters | Turnout | Outcome |
| Question | Votes | % | Votes | % | Invalid/ blank votes | Total | Registered voters | Turnout | Outcome |
|---|---|---|---|---|---|---|---|---|---|
| Pensionskasse Win-Win | 5,678 | 43.9 | 7,253 | 56.1 | 759 | 13,690 | 19,448 | 70.4 | Rejected |
| Win-Win 50 | 6,647 | 49.7 | 6,721 | 50.3 | 322 | 13,690 | 19,448 | 70.4 | Rejected |
Source: Liechtenstein Government

=== Preference voting ===
Some voters voted yes to both options, but highlighted a preference for one of them.

| Choice | Votes | % |
|---|---|---|
| Pensionskasse Win-Win | 893 | 19.40 |
| Win-Win 50 | 3,710 | 80.60 |
| Total | 4,603 | 100.00 |
| Valid votes | 4,603 | 82.34 |
| Invalid/blank votes | 987 | 17.66 |
| Total votes | 5,590 | 100.00 |
Source: Liechtenstein Government
