= 1952 Libyan general election =

- 19 February 1952
- All 55 seats in the House of Representatives
Prime Minister before	Prime Minister after
Mahmud al-Muntasir	Mahmud al-Muntasir

General elections were held in Libya on 19 February 1952 to elect the members of the House of Representatives, the lower house of Parliament, except in three constituencies in Tripolitania, where the elections were delayed until March after rioters destroyed the electoral register on election day. They were the first elections in the country's history.

== Electoral system ==
Voting was restricted to sane and solvent men over the age of 21, and did not allow for secret balloting, except in urban areas. They elected 55 members to the lower house of the Parliament in single member constituencies. The constituencies were divided into urban areas and rural areas; in the urban areas voters were given a ballot paper, which they dropped into the coloured ballot box of their candidate, whilst in rural areas voters were asked who they supported and their answer recorded by registering officer, with a committee of observers as witnesses. The committee included a returning officer, a judge and a notable person from the constituency.

The United Nations turned down a proposal that it should monitor the elections.

== Campaign and election day ==
A total of 141 candidates contested the election, most of whom ran as independents. There were two opposing groups; one supportive of Prime Minister Mahmud al-Muntasir, and one led by the Congress Party headed by Beshir Bey Sadawi. The Congress Party was largely focussed on opposition to foreign influence in Libya, despite receiving financial support from Egypt. It also claimed that voting for pro-government candidates would lead to voters effectively excommunicating themselves from the Islamic faith. The Prime Minister called on voters to elect the candidate most likely to help implement the government's 19-point programme.

On election day one person was killed and a British police officer was injured following exchanges of fire between a crowd of people and the police in Misrata, and several people were also hospitalised after the police used tear gas. The violence broke out after the crowd was told that their requests for a Congress Party candidate to be present in the polling booth was illegal. Similar protests occurred in Tripolitania.

== Results and aftermath ==
As expected, the Congress Party were victorious in Tripoli, but pro-government candidates won all other seats. The Congress Party won a total of eight seats, whilst the majority of seats were held by pro-government independents. Following the election, rioting broke out, resulting in all political parties being banned. Sadawi was deported to Egypt, along with his brother, nephew and some other supporters, whilst the Congress Party secretary was deported to his native Tunisia.
