= 2014 Libyan Constitutional Assembly election =

Constitutional Assembly elections took place in Libya on 20 February 2014. Nominations for elections to the constituent assembly started on 6 October 2013; registration for candidates to the assembly was over as of 11 November 2013. The assembly will be composed of 20 members each from Libya's three regions: Tripolitania, Cyrenaica and Fezzan. The work of the committee is expected to last from March 2014 until July 2014. The constitutional declaration submitted in August 2011 by the formerly ruling National Transitional Council indicated that Congress itself would appoint the commission; however the General National Congress (GNC) voted instead to hold an election for the selection of individuals to the constitutional commission. The constitutional commission will draw up the constitution, which will then be up for vote in a referendum. As of early January 2014, 1,001,910 voters had registered via SMS.

The United Nations Support Mission in Libya has once again offered to support the electoral process, as they did with the GNC election that occurred in 2012.

== Electoral law ==
A three-man committee was appointed by the GNC on 13 February 2013 to draft the electoral law. The committee's three members represent each of Libya's historical regions; Tripolitania, Cyrenaica, and Fezzan, and it will also be backed by an advisory council taking one representative from each of Libya's 13 electoral constituencies.

60 members were elected directly by voters in their respective constituencies. Six seats were reserved for women, and two seats were allocated to each of the Amazigh, Tebu and Tuareg minorities.

All candidates contested the election as individuals, instead of running on party lists.

== Campaign ==
The elections are being boycotted by the Berber and Toubou ethnic groups, although 14 Toubou candidates registered to run in the elections. The Tebu National Assembly announced in April that they would run for seats.

Re-runs in some areas had to be held on 26 February 2014 due to difficulties on polling day. An election also took place for two Tebu seats on 26 April 2014 and for another three seats in Obari on 3 May 2014, leaving two Amazigh seats unresolved.

== Results ==
On 26 February 2014, preliminary results for 10 constituencies across Libya were released, relating to 39 seats in the Constitutional Assembly. The results for 47 of the 60 seats were released on 2 March 2014.

Region	District	Constituency	General		Women		Tebu		Tuareg		Amazigh	
Region	District	Constituency	Votes	Seats	Votes	Seats	Votes	Seats	Votes	Seats	Votes	Seats
Western	Sirte	1	2,512	1								
Western	Sirte	2	4,141	1								
Western	Sirte	3	4,069	1								
Western	Misrata	1	54,908	1								
Western	Misrata	2	12,495	1								
Western	Misrata	3	12,304	1								
Western	Misrata	4	9,010	1								
Western	Tripoli	1	57,935	1	44,561	1						
Western	Tripoli	2	23,346	1								
Western	Tripoli	3	61,619	1	55,543	1						
Western	Tripoli	4	17,221	1								
Western	Zawiya	1	25,790	1								
Western	Zawiya	2	10,740	1								
Western	Zawiya	3	—								(Note: No election was held. One seat left vacant.)	
Western	Zawiya	4	6,594	1								
Western	Zawiya	5	25,772	2								
Southern	Sebha	1–1	1,416	1	9,667	1						
Southern	Sebha	1–2	2,136	1	9,667	1						
Southern	Sebha	1–3	3,199	(Note: One seat in this constituency was replaced by the women seat.)	9,667	1						
Southern	Sebha	1–4	2,983	1	9,667	1						
Southern	Sebha	1–5	2,058	1	9,667	1						
Southern	Sebha	2–1	2,035		6,199	1						
Southern	Sebha	2–2	2,855	1	6,199	1						
Southern	Sebha	2–3	1,405	1	6,199	1						
Southern	Sebha	2–4	1,270	1	6,199	1						
Southern	Ubari	1–1	2,164	1					631	1		
Southern	Ubari	1–2	1,585	1					631	1		
Southern	Ubari	1–3	2,160	1					631	1		
Southern	Ubari	2–1	2,370	1			1,524	1				
Southern	Ubari	2–2	1,544	1			1,524	1				
Southern	Ubari	2–3	1,887	1			1,524	1				
Southern	Ubari	3	1,007	1								
Southern	Ghadames	1	2,727	1								
Southern	Ghadames	2	—						245	1		
Eastern	Al Butnan	1	14,540	2								
Eastern	Al Butnan	2	4,189	1								
Eastern	Al Butnan	3										
Eastern	Al Jabal Al Akhdar	1	3,582	1								
Eastern	Al Jabal Al Akhdar	2	12,879	2								
Eastern	Al Jabal Al Akhdar	3	6,953	1								
Eastern	Al Jabal Al Akhdar	4	4,238	1								
Eastern	Greater Benghazi	1	67,868	2	80,170	1						
Eastern	Greater Benghazi	2			80,170	1						
Eastern	Greater Benghazi	3	6,493	1	80,170	1						
Eastern	Ajdabiya	1	9,346	2	80,170	1						
Eastern	Ajdabiya	2	2,299	1	80,170	1						
Eastern	Ajdabiya	3			80,170	1						
Eastern	Ajdabiya	4	—		80,170	1	1,689	1				
Total			495,644	45	196,140	5	3,213	2	876	2	0	0
