= Libyan interim Constitutional Declaration =

2011 interim constitution of Libya

The Constitutional Declaration is the current supreme law of Libya, introduced due to the overthrow of the Gaddafi government in the Libyan Civil War. It was finalised on 3 August 2011 by the National Transitional Council, and is intended to remain in effect until a permanent constitution is written and ratified in a referendum. The document was publicly announced at a press conference of 10 August by Abdul Hafiz Ghoga, Vice President and official spokesman of the NTC.

The document consists of 37 articles in five sections. Articles 1–6 state general provisions regarding Libya as a state. Articles 7–15 specify civil rights and public freedoms. Articles 17–29 specify the operation of the interim government. Articles 30–32 guarantee an independent judiciary. Articles 33–37 are "conclusive provisions".

The Constituent Assembly of Libya was elected in 2014. It prepared the 2017 draft Libyan constitution which it approved by a two-thirds majority in July 2017.

== Declaration of statehood and basic rights ==
Article 1 of the Constitutional Declaration describes the Libyan state as follows:

- it is a democracy, wherein the people act as the source of political authorities
- Tripoli is the State capital
- Islam is the State religion
- The Islamic Sharia is its principal source of legislation
- the State grants the right of freedom of religion for non-Muslim minorities
- Arabic is the official language
- The State protects the linguistic and cultural rights of all components of Libyan society

Article 3 defines the flag of Libya. Article 4 declares the aim of establishing a democratic State based on a multi-party system. Article 6 describes the principle of rule of law taking precedence over tribal or personal loyalties, and the principle of non-discrimination and equal rights of all citizens regardless of religion, ethnicity or social status, and the guarantee of the state upholding women's rights, granting full participation of women in politics, economy and the social sphere.

== Provisions for the transitional phase ==
Article 30 of the document lays out a process for the drafting of a permanent constitution, with time limits for each section meaning that one should be in place by around December 2013 at the latest. The process has however been subject to several delays such as the postponement of the General National Congress election by a month, and the target for appointing a Constituent Assembly was missed due to political wrangling over the post of Prime Minister.

Article 29, repeated as article 33, contains the provision that no member of the National Transitional Council may nominate a candidate or themselves assume the position of President of the state, of a member of the legislative council, or of a ministerial portfolio.

== Amendments ==
As of October 2023, there are 13 amendments to the Libyan interim Constitutional Declaration.

The tenth amendment divided the country into three voting districts (Tripolitania, Cyrenaica and Fezzan) for the upcoming referendum on the 2017 draft constitution by the Constituent Assembly. It was adopted by the House of Representatives on 26 November 2018.

The twelfth amendment created a 24-member committee divided equally among Libya's three historic regions to draft a new constitution, replacing the 2017 draft constitution. It was approved by the House of Representatives on 10 February 2022 after 126 out of "more than" 147 members present voted for the amendment. However, the High Council of State rejected the amendment by a vote of 51 out of 60 on 24 February.

In March 2023, both the House of Representatives and the High Council of State passed the thirteenth amendment containing thirty-four articles defining a new system of government and the tasks of the elected president and prime minister.

== Further constitutional steps ==
The Constituent Assembly of Libya of 20 members from each of Tripolitania, Cyrenaica and Fezzan was elected in February 2014. The election was organised by the High National Election Commission (HNEC). In July 2017, the assembly finalised the 2017 draft Libyan constitution.
