= Free Officers movement (Libya) =

1969 Libyan revolution leaders

- حركة الضباط الأحرار
- Flag of the Libyan Arab Republic (1969–1972)
- Founding leader: Muammar Gaddafi
- Dates active: 1964–1969
- Active regions: Kingdom of Libya
- Ideology: Arab nationalism Republicanism; Anti-imperialism; Pan-Arabism; Arab socialism Nasserism; Anti-Zionism
- Political position: Left-wing

The Free Officers movement (Arabic: حركة الضباط الأحرار) was a group of Arab nationalist and Nasserist officers in the Libyan Army that planned and carried out the 1969 Libyan revolution, which overthrew the Senussi monarchy of King Idris I, ending the Libyan monarchy. It was led by a twelve-member cabinet known as the Revolutionary Command Council, whose chairman was Muammar Gaddafi, which came to govern the Libyan Arab Republic.

== Background ==
Since Libyan independence, King Idris's rule was unpopular due to the widespread corruption of his government, regional favoritism, and perceived preference of foreign interests over those of Libyans. The kingdom made little effort in attempting to unite the country and poorly managed Libya's internal affairs. The discovery of significant oil reserves in 1959 and subsequent income from petroleum sales caused the poor nation of Libya to establish a wealthy state, however the nation's wealth was increasingly concentrated in the hands of King Idris and the elite. This led to many Libyans supporting Muammar Gaddafi's coup.

Gaddafi established the Free Officers movement at the Libyan Royal Military Academy in Benghazi in 1964, a revolutionary group which met secretly. After the Arab defeat in the Six-Day War in 1967, the Free Officers were convinced that the monarchy had to be replaced. They became one of the several groups plotting against the monarchy, succeeding in 1969.

By 1969, the US Central Intelligence Agency (CIA) was expecting parts of the Libyan Armed Forces to launch a coup. Although they claimed that they knew of Gaddafi's Free Officers movement, they have since ignored it, stating that they were instead monitoring Abdul Aziz Shalhi's Black Boots revolutionary group.

== Coup d'état ==
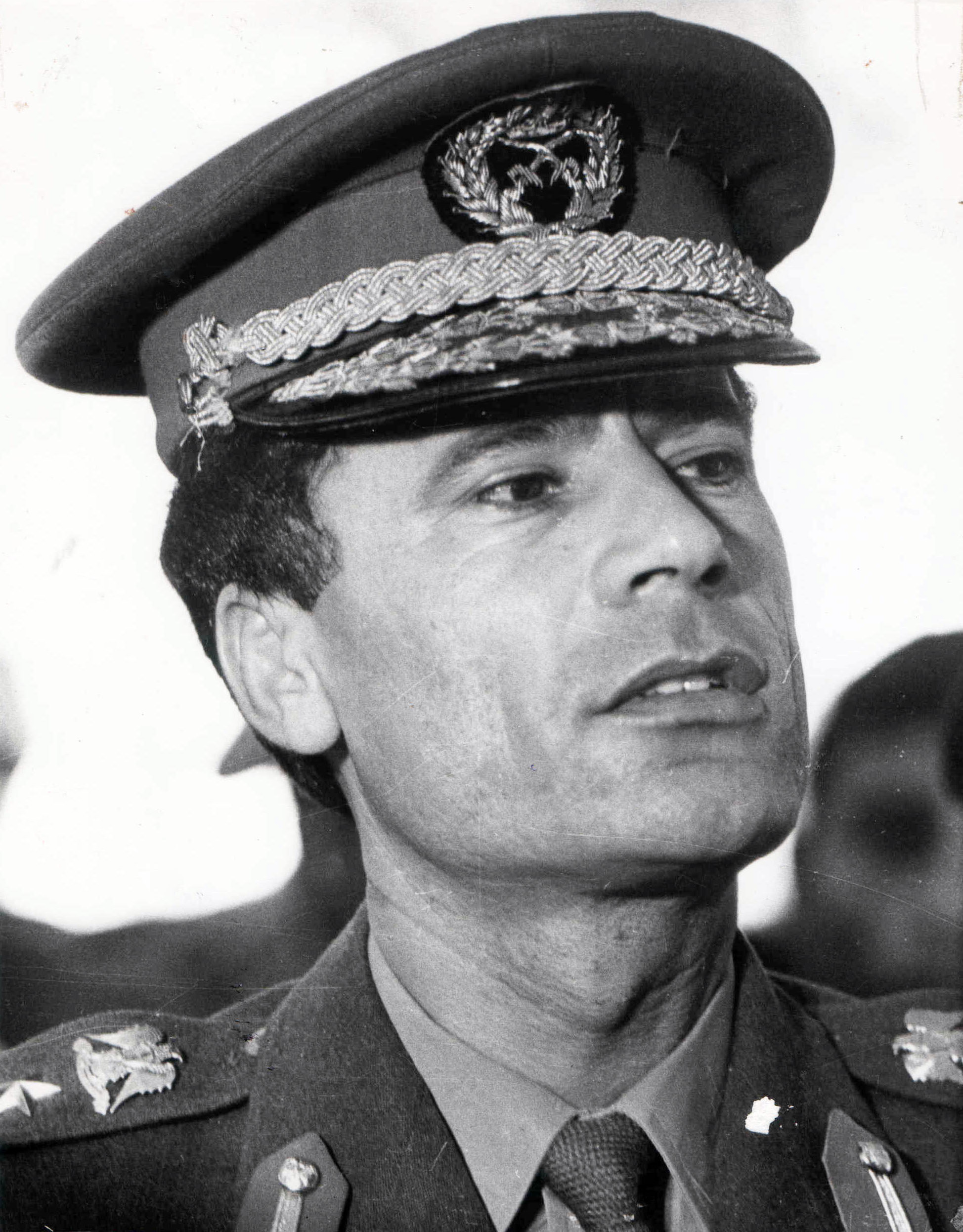
Muammar Gaddafi, pictured shortly after his seizure of power, on a visit to Yugoslavia in 1970

In mid-1969, Idris travelled abroad to Turkey and Greece during widespread rumors of a coup by the Shalhi brothers on 5 September. Gaddafi's Free Officers recognized this as their chance to overthrow the monarchy before the Shalhi brothers, initiating "Operation Jerusalem".

On 1 September 1969, a group of about 70 young army officers from the Free Officers movement and enlisted men mostly assigned to the Signal Corps usurped the government and abolished the Kingdom of Libya. The coup started in Benghazi and was completed in two hours. Army units quickly reassembled in support of the coup and established military control over Tripoli and in other places across the country within a few days.

The Free Officers occupied airports, police depots, radio stations, and government offices in Tripoli and Benghazi. Gaddafi captured the Barqa barracks in Benghazi, Umar Muhayshi took over Tripoli barracks and Jalloud seized the city's anti-aircraft batteries. Khweldi Hameidi captured the Tripoli radio station and was sent to arrest crown prince Hasan as-Senussi and force him to give up his claim to the throne. The coup was popular among the civilian population, especially younger people. There was no resistance in Cyrenaica and Fezzan and no deaths or injuries were reported.

The Free Officers movement was headed by a twelve-member cabinet that called itself the Revolutionary Command Council (RCC). This body formed the government after the coup d'état. In its proclamation on 1 September, the Revolutionary Command Council declared the country to be an independent and sovereign state with the name of the Libyan Arab Republic, which would continue "in the path of freedom, unity, and social justice, guaranteeing the right of equality to its citizens, and opening before them the doors of honorable work." They characterized the rule of the Turks and Italians and the "reactionary" government which were overthrown as belonging to "dark ages," from which Libyans were called to move forward as "free brothers" to a new age of prosperity, equality, and honor.

== Ideology ==
The Free Officers were republicans and were hostile to the monarchy and King Idris because of their social marginalization to many lower and middle-class Libyans. They strongly rejected the policies and principles of King Idris for his corruption and close links with Western nations. After the Six-Day War in 1967, the Free Officers demanded "total political and economic independence from any kind of foreign (non-Arab) influence, direction, control or constraint." They introduced policies that called for social justice, self-determination, Arab nationalism and anti-imperialism. They strongly supported Pan-Arabism and support for Arabs everywhere, as well as Arab socialism. They were also in support of Islamist values and Shari'a.

== Composition ==
The Free Officers movement was composed of lower and middle-class Libyans from less prominent tribes who were not affiliated with the Senussi family or other powerful families of Cyrenaica. All but one of them studied at the military academy and did not go to university. The formation of the Free Officers movement was taken from Gamal Abdel Nasser's example of the Egyptian Free Officers.

== Membership ==
Major officers of the movement include:

- Muammar Gaddafi
- Abdessalam Jalloud
- Umar Muhayshi
- Khweldi Hameidi
- Bashir Saghir Hawadi
- Abu-Bakr Yunis Jabr
- Mustafa Kharoubi
- Abdel Moneim al-Houni
- Mohammed Najm
- Abdul Fatah Younis
- Khalifa Haftar
- Omar El-Hariri
- Awad Ali Hamza
- Mukhtar Abdullah al-Qarawi
- Sayyid Gaddaf al-Dam
- Mohammed Abu Bakr Al-Magariaf
