= Khweldi Hameidi =

Libyan military general (1943-2015)

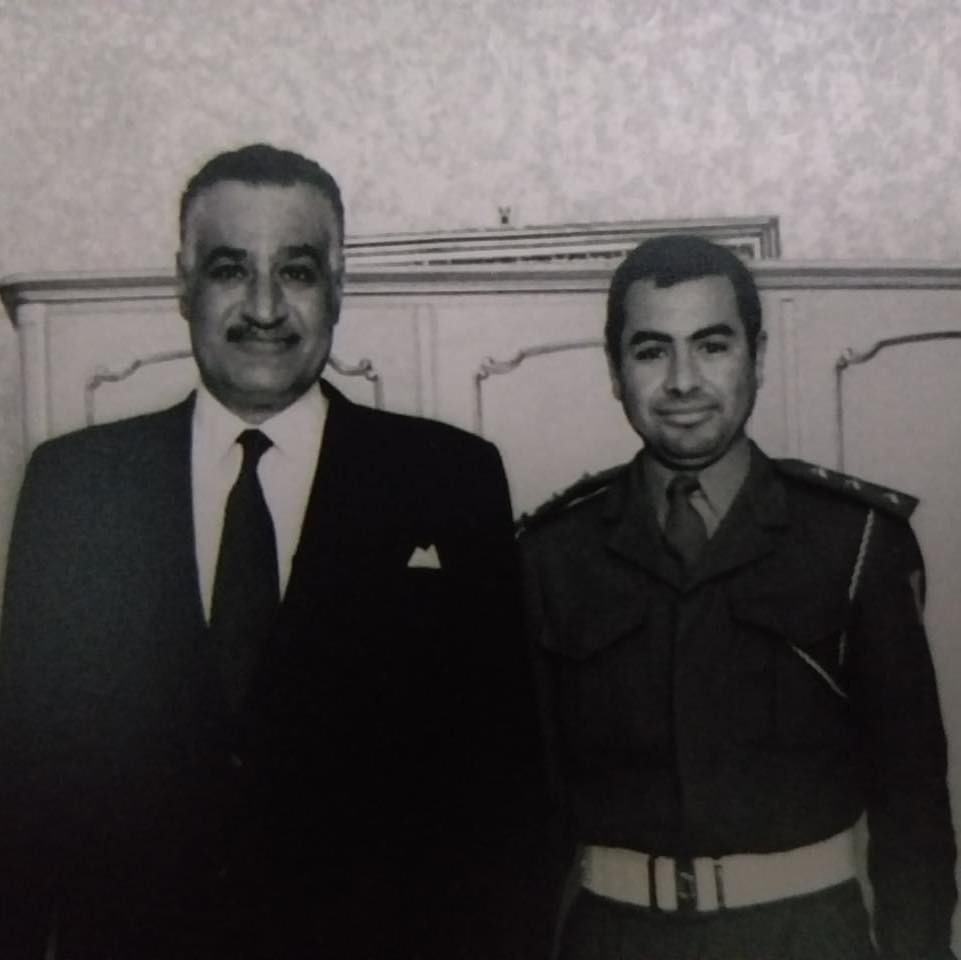
- Hameidi with Egyptian president Gamal Abdel Nasser
- Born: January 1943; Surman, Italian Libya
- Died: 27 July 2015 (aged 72); Cairo, Egypt
- Occupation: General
- Spouse: Aisha
- Relatives: Khaled K. El-Hamedi (son); Al-Saadi Gaddafi (son-in-law)

Al-Khweldi Muhammad Salih Abdullah El-Hamedi (Arabic: الخويلدي محمد الحميدي; January 1943 – 27 July 2015), also transliterated as Khuwailidi al-Humaidi, was a Libyan major general under Muammar Gaddafi, founding member of the Libyan Revolutionary Command Council. He was part of Gaddafi's inner circle. After the fall of Gaddafi, Hameidi went into exile. He associated with other Gaddafi loyalists and was the first Secretary General of the Libyan Popular National Movement.

== Biography ==
=== Early life and education ===
Hameidi was born in Surman in January 1943. His father owned a farm between Surman and Sabratha. He attended primary school in Surman, secondary school in Zawiya, and graduated from the Benghazi Military University Academy as a second lieutenant in 1965. His first military assignment was with the Royal Battalion in Derna. He was subsequently appointed assistant commander of the 1st Idris Battalion in Sabha and later Tarhuna.

=== Personal life ===
He married his cousin Aisha al-Hamidi in 1970. His wife was a history professor and earned a master's degree from the Al-Fateh University in Tripoli. They had six daughters and three sons, including Khaled K. El-Hamedi, the president of Libyan NGO, International Organization for Peace, Care and Relief. One of his daughters is married to Gaddafi's son Al-Saadi Gaddafi.

He was an avid collector of arts, including Chinese porcelain and African ebony sculptures. He also had a passion for raising animals, such as falconry, Arabian horses, deer, and songbirds.

=== Career under Gaddafi ===
Hameidi played a leading role in the 1969 Libyan coup d'état that overthrew King Idris and brought Muammar Gaddafi to power. Hameidi was specifically tasked with seizing the radio station in Tripoli and arresting the crown prince Hasan as-Senussi. After the successful coup, Hameidi was part of the twelve men that formed the Libyan Revolutionary Command Council (RCC).

In the summer of 1975, Planning Minister Umar Muhayshi, Bashir al-Saghir Hawady, and Awad Ali Hamza, who were all part of the 12-member RCC, led a coup against Gaddafi. The coup failed; Muhayshi fled to Tunisia and another RCC member suspected of disloyalty, Abdul-Munim al-Huni, fled to Egypt. Hawady and Hamza were arrested. The RCC was ultimately reduced to only five members: Gaddafi, Abdessalam Jalloud, Abu-Bakr Yunis Jabr, Mustafa Kharubi, and Hameidi. All five were from poor or lower-middle-class background.

Hameidi served as interior minister, chief of military intelligence, and head of the military courts in the Gaddafi government. He was also a member of General Provisional Committee for Defense.

=== Libyan Civil War ===
When the First Libyan Civil War broke out in February 2011, Hameidi did not hold any official political or executive office as he was retired. He did, however, continue to enjoy a close personal relationship with Gaddafi due to his daughter's marriage to Gaddafi's son Saadi. Hameidi reportedly received a field command in Zawiya during the civil war.

Due to his perceived closeness with the Gaddafi family and his refusal to defect, Hameidi and his family became a target for NATO during its military intervention in Libya. His home, located near Surman, was bombed by NATO on 19 June 2011, which resulted in the death of his daughter-in-law and three grandchildren. A total of 15 family members, including three children, were killed by NATO's bombs. NATO claimed his home was being used as a "command center" by Gaddafi and thus a legitimate target. Hameidi's son Khaled claimed NATO had tried to assassinate Khweldi Hameidi in order to demoralize the Gaddafi regime.

After the Battle of Tripoli, Hameidi fled to Tunisia, where he suffered a heart attack and was hospitalized in Tunis. Tunisia accused him of entering the country illegally.

=== Exile ===
Hameidi never stood trial in Tunisia and was not deported to Libya. He reportedly spent time in Morocco before settling in Egypt. In February 2012, the Libyan Popular National Movement was founded by Gaddafi loyalists in exile and Hameidi served as its first Secretary General. The party was banned from participating in the 2012 Libyan parliamentary election. Hameidi suffered another heart attack and died in Cairo on 27 July 2015. He was 72.
