= Benghazi Military University Academy =

Military academy in Benghazi, Libya

- Type: Military Academy
- Established: 1957
- Location: Benghazi, Libya

Benghazi Military University Academy is a military academy in Benghazi in Libya.

== Alumni ==
- Muammar Gaddafi – Libyan leader (1969–2011), Brotherly Leader and Guide of the Revolution
- Khalifa Haftar – Field Marshal, commander of Libyan National Army
- Abdessalam Jalloud – Libyan Prime Minister (1972–1977)
- Abu-Bakr Yunis Jabr – Libyan Minister of Defence (1970–2011)
- Khweldi Hameidi – Libyan general, Secretary General of the Libyan Popular National Movement
- Abdel Moneim al-Houni – Libyan Minister of Interior (1972–1974), Libyan Minister of Foreign Affairs (1974–1975), Libya's representative to the Arab League
- Mohammed Najm – Libyan Minister of Foreign Affairs (1970–1972)
- Bashir Saghir Hawadi – Chief judge of the Libyan People's Court (1970), General Secretary of the Arab Socialist Union
- Umar Muhayshi – Libyan Minister of Finance (1970), Attorney general of the Libyan People's Court, Minister of Planning
- Mustafa Kharoubi – Deputy chief of staff, head of military intelligence
