= 1969 Libyan coup attempt =

Attempted coup against Colonel Gaddafi

- Part of Arab Cold War
Date	7 December 1969; 56 years ago
Location	Libya
Result	Coup suppressed

Belligerents
Gaddafi's government Supported by: Egypt	Rebels

Commanders and leaders
Col. Muammar Gaddafi (Chairman of the Revolutionary Council)	Lt. Col Adam al-Hawaz; (Defense Minister) Lt. Col Moussa Ahmed; (Interior Minister)

Strength
Unknown	Unknown

Casualties and losses
Unknown	Unknown

Having taken power in a coup three months earlier, Muammar Gaddafi faced a mutiny by army and interior ministers Moussa Ahmed and Adam Hawaz, both from the eastern Barqa region. The pair were routed and imprisoned in the first of Gaddafi's many survivals.

== History ==
=== Background ===
On September 1, 1969, a group of Libyan officers – the "Free Unionist Officers" – under the command of Colonel Muammar Gaddafi, overthrew King Idris I of the Kingdom of Libya. After the coup, revolutionary officers established the Revolutionary Command Council (RCC), a body originally conceived as a collective leadership government. Due to his colorful personality and intense political style, with the RCC members' overwhelmingly consensus, Colonel Gaddafi became de facto the new regime's leader.

The new regime also included a Council of Ministers chaired by Prime Minister Mahmud Suleiman Maghribi which had eight members, among them were two military officers, Adam al-Hawaz and Moussa Ahmed, ministers of Defense and Interior respectively. Neither of them was part of the RCC. These officers participated in the revolutionary coup of September, but they would come into conflict with the new government. Dissatisfied with Gaddafi's centralist policies of removing his colleagues from political power and concentrating it in his hands, ministers Adam al-Hawaz and Moussa Ahmed distanced themselves from Gaddafi's regime and began plotting their coup d'état.

=== Coup attempt ===
The coup attempt began on December 7, when rebels attempted to take control of key positions in eastern Libya. On the same day, the two coup leaders were captured and the government foiled the plot. On the way to his arrest, Hawaz attempted suicide, which was prevented by Libyan authorities. The Nasser government expressed solidarity with the Libyan government and the attempted coup was allegedly aborted with Egyptian security assistance. The plot was publicly revealed on December 10 and the government issued a series of statements. Libyan radio accused the alleged plotters in the conspiracy as "opportunists acting for imperialism" and tried to "steal the revolution". In an interview, Gaddafi assured that both Hawaz and Moussa Ahmed were under arrest, with more arrests among high-ranking officers that the RCC trusted, but who continued to look down on lower-ranking Free Officers.

The military incident coincided with Anglo-Libyan negotiations on military bases, which caused Gaddafi to warn about the alleged links of the coup plotters with foreign interests or even the possible involvement of the United States and the United Kingdom in the coup attempt. Contrary to Libyan suspicions, the United States denied any involvement in the coup and later contributed to the detection of several coup attempts in the country.

=== Aftermath ===
On December 11, a constitutional proclamation declared the Libyan Revolutionary Command Council as the highest authority of the republic. A new cabinet was formed in the post-coup crisis, the first government reshuffle since the September revolution. Colonel Gaddafi remained at his post as chairman of the RCC, also became prime minister and the supreme commander of the armed forces. Major Abdel Salam Jallud, generally regarded as second only to Gaddafi in the RCC, became deputy prime minister and minister of interior. Captain Abu-Bakr Yunis Jabr became the minister of defense.

Defense Minister Lieutenant Colonel Adam al-Hawaz and Interior Minister Lieutenant Colonel Moussa Ahmed, with another 30 officers, were imprisoned since December 1969. Despite scant evidence and protests by elders from Cyrenaica, he was sentenced to death in a trial presided by Major Mohammed Najm. The sentence was not carried out and Hawaz remained imprisoned at least until 1984. In March 1988, Hawaz's family was informed of his death but was not given any details. Moussa Ahmed remained imprisoned for almost 20 years – being released in 1988.

== See also ==
- 1969 Libyan coup d'état
- 2013 Libyan coup d'état attempt
- 2014 Libyan coup d'état attempts
