= Mustafa Kharoubi =

Libyan general and politician (1939-2015)

- مصطفى الخروبي
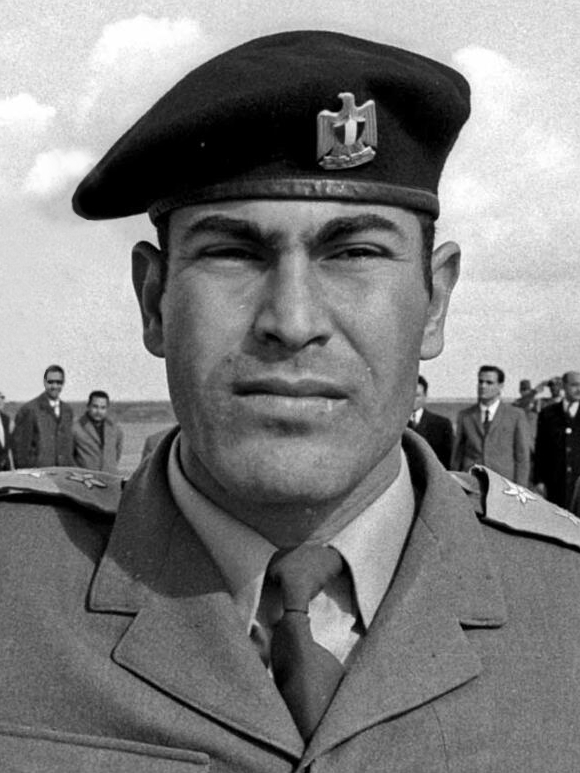
- Kharoubi in 1970

Deputy Chief of Staff
- In office 1969–1979
- Chief of Staff: Abu-Bakr Yunis Jabr

Personal details
- Born: 1939 Matred, Italian Libya
- Died: 16 July 2015 (aged 75–76) Libya

Mustafa al-Kharoubi (Arabic: مصطفى الخروبي; 1939 – 16 July 2015), also transliterated as Kharubi, was a Libyan general and politician under Muammar Gaddafi. He was part of Gaddafi's inner circle. A classmate of Gaddafi, Kharoubi served as envoy to Arab countries, but became increasingly sidelined from politics in the 1990s. He died on 16 July 2015, but there were multiple accounts regarding his cause of death.

== Biography ==
Kharoubi was born in Matred, near Surman. He was classmates with Gaddafi and Abdessalam Jalloud while they attended school in Sabha in 1961. They later attended the Benghazi Military University Academy together.

He played a key role in the 1969 Libyan coup d'état that brought Gaddafi to power. During the coup, he was tasked with seizing control of the radio building in Benghazi. After the successful coup, he was among the twelve men named to the Libyan Revolutionary Command Council (RCC). He served as deputy chief of staff under chief of staff Abu-Bakr Yunis Jabr.

He later served as head of military intelligence and Gaddafi's envoy to Arab countries until the 1990s. He was instrumental in thwarting the 1975 coup attempt led by fellow RCC member Umar Muhayshi. In the aftermath of Muhayshi's failed coup, only five of the original twelve RCC members remained: Gaddafi, Jalloud, Jabr, Khweldi Hameidi, and Kharoubi. All five were from poor or lower-middle-class background.

Starting in the 1990s, Kharoubi was increasingly sidelined in the Gaddafi regime. When the First Libyan Civil War broke out in 2011, he was rumored to have resigned or been placed under house arrest by Gaddafi. His last assignment was greeting South African President Jacob Zuma in April 2011 during the civil war. Kharoubi was arrested after the civil war and allegedly tortured by former Libyan Islamic Fighting Group member Khaled al-Sharif at the al-Hadba prison. He was photographed in Hadba courtroom in September 2013 alongside Abdullah Senussi and Baghdadi Mahmudi. No charges were filed against him.

He died on 16 July 2015. There were two accounts of his death: the attorney general's office claimed he had died of cancer at home in Tripoli with his family days after being released on compassionate grounds, while the other account claimed he had died in prison after being denied medical treatment. On 27 July 2015, Mehdi Bouaouaja, the Tunisian lawyer for Baghdadi Mahmudi, alleged that Kharoubi had died after being poisoned.
