= Aid Convoy =

British charity

Aid Convoy is a British charitable organisation running and supporting various humanitarian aid projects, mostly in Eastern Europe. Its aims are achieved primarily by means of running convoys and supporting other organisations with consultancy.

== Projects ==
Aid Convoy's projects have focused on Kosovo, Albania and Ukraine. It has also lent support and expertise to projects such as On the line in Burkina Faso (a Millenium project linking people on the Greenwich Meridian line) and Viva Palestina in Gaza.

=== Ukraine ===
Working in the area affected by the Chernobyl nuclear disaster, Aid Convoy was closely partnered with the "Our Generation" youth group whose educational and welfare projects included:

- Providing a safe and alcohol-free social space for young people
- Running the Anomaly theatre group which runs drug- and HIV-awareness physical theatre productions at schools across the country and also in Poland
- Publishing the "BiT" newspaper
- Training and encouraging similar youth groups in other cities

The youth group, based in Chernihiv itself provides volunteering for a number of other initiatives including hospitals, orphanages, schools and universities, with help from Aid Convoy and other international charity partners.

== Ethos and methodology ==
The organisation is entirely operated by unpaid volunteers.

Support is raised through fundraising events and from the public, private companies, and Charitable Trusts, but not from governments nor major aid agencies. The organisation claims that its small scale and localised fundraising helps it to make its supporters feel empowered and involved, and also enables the provision of feedback with a high level of detail.

== History ==
Aid Convoy evolved from community development group The Kemptown Network in the Kemptown area of Brighton. In early 1999 meetings about supporting Kosovan refugees were organised by founders Giles Hippisley and Kieran Turner (the latter being now Director of Aid Convoy and a Green Party politician).

After investigations including consulting refugees at the Tinsley House Immigration Removal Centre, it was decided to send aid to refugee camps around Kosovo, and that support must be equally offered to civilians from both the Albanian and Serb populations. The first trip, with five vehicles, was in conjunction with Workers' Aid for Kosova, and delivered to a charity in Tirana, Albania.

A second trip followed the next month, and was sent to the area around a refugee camp in North Macedonia, in conjunction with Canterbury-based Charity, British Humanitarian Aid, and Tewkesbury-based Charity Tewkesbury Independent Aid. A Dodge 50 Series truck broke down en route but was rescued thanks to Simon Mayo of BBC Radio 1 alerting the RAC live on air. It arrived in time to rejoin the rest of the forty-vehicle convoy, and delivered its load directly to the village of Pirok.

The next convoy was among the first to enter Kosovo itself after the NATO bombing campaign of spring 1999, and travelled with sponsorship from the University of Aberdeen Students' Representative Council (now Aberdeen University Students' Association), and in conjunction again with Workers' Aid for Kosova. The convoy's six vehicles travelled to Pristina and Kosovska Mitrovica, where the University of Prishtina Students' Union and various miners' trade unions were supported. During this month-long project the team also developed contacts in Đakovica and Prizren, and in Rubik, Albania.

Further convoys included the delivery of ambulances and surgical equipment to a hospital in Gnjilane, and work with other NGOs including CO-PLAN, the International Organization for Migration, the International Rescue Committee, and the British Council.

In 2001 Aid Convoy moved on to supporting Ukraine, again working with partners including Tewkesbury Independent Aid, Horsham-based Bear Essential Aid, and British Humanitarian Aid (BHA). BHA introduced a relationship with their partner, "Aratta centre for children and families", a Ukrainian public organisation which supports people living with the legacy of Chernobyl. The work with Aratta continued for several years, later evolving into work with the Our Generation youth group, as well as hospitals, orphanages and schools in the area.

During 2002–03 the organisation was renamed Aid Convoy.

In 2003 Aid Convoy was supported by a novel fund-raising event, "Canvas", which took the form of a raffle of works of art in Brighton. During this period projects included working to achieve a clear water supply for the Bathore neighbourhood of Tirana, and later a children's playground there.

The success of the "Canvas" event led to an ongoing series of similar high-value art raffles for both Aid Convoy and other charities. In connection with this, the summer of 2003 also saw "Nosebag children's parties" accompany a convoy to Ukraine.

Since 2009, consultancy and support has been given to Viva Palestina and other charities, with convoys delivering medical aid to Gaza.

In 2010, Aid Convoy's Director Kieran Turner was kidnapped – and later released – while supporting the Road to Hope aid convoy to Gaza.

Since 2013 Aid Convoy has focused on advising and consulting over running convoys, as some of its team moved into professional work with larger aid agencies.

== Bibliography ==
- "Shelled, stranded and still hoping to return to Kosova"; The Argus (newspaper); Newsquest, Brighton, Thursday August 19, 1999
- RAC staff newsletter (autumn issue, 1999); RAC Limited; London, 1999
- Turner, Kieran: "Aid Convoy — humanitarian aid & community development"; Brighton Lifeline Humanitarian Aid, Brighton, 2003
- Robertson, Rachel: "Convoy", documentary, 1999. IMDb
