= Alhouni =

Alhouni, al Houni or al-Houni may refer to:

- Abdel Moneim al-Houni, Libyan military officer
- Mohaned Alhouni (born 1996), Libyan professional pickleball player
- Mota Alhouni (born 1992), Libyan professional pickleball player
