= Hamedi =

Hamedi is a surname. Notable people with the surname include:

- Ebrahim Hamedi (born 1949), Iranian pop singer better known by his stage name Ebi
- Niloofar Hamedi (born 1992), Iranian journalist
- Tareg Hamedi (born 1998), Saudi karateka

== See also ==
- Khaled K. El-Hamedi, Libyan humanitarian activist
