= Libyan People's Court =

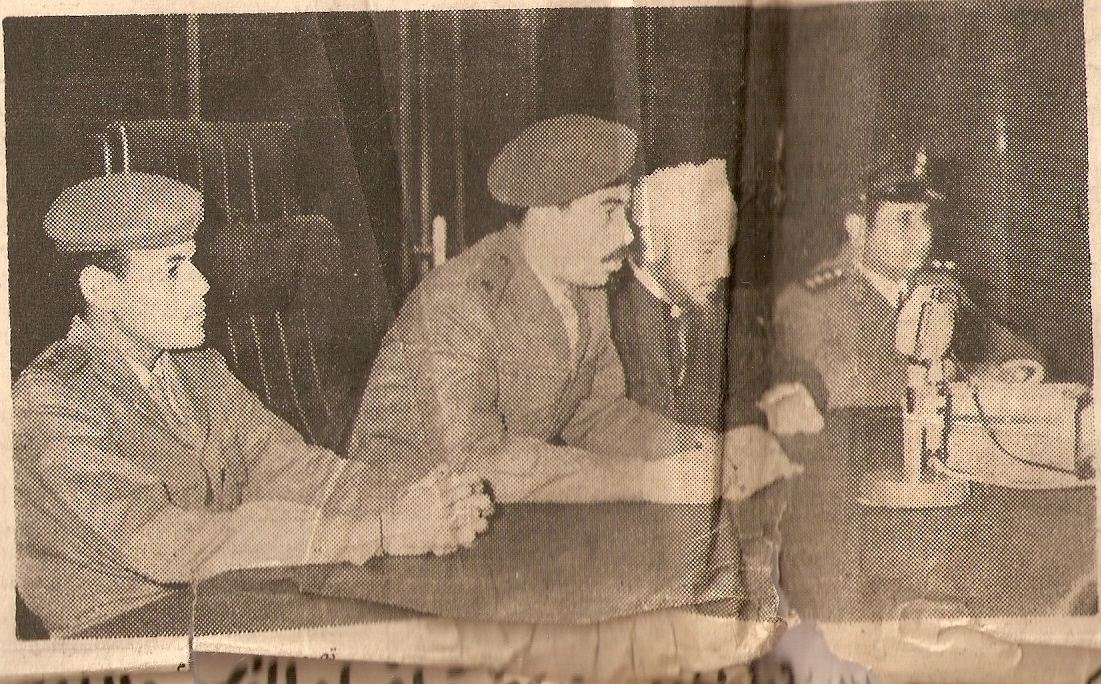
Judges of the People's Court, including Bashir Houadi (second from left), the Chief Judge.

The Libyan People's Court is an emergency tribunal founded in Libya after the revolution of 1 September 1969. Although its initial purpose was to try the officials of the overthrown Kingdom, many others also were tried by this court. This article discusses only the trial of officials of the Kingdom.

== Historical background ==
- The Kingdom era in Libya came to its end on the dawn 1 September 1969, as a group of junior-ranking army officers assumed authority. Almost all Libyans welcomed this revolution even before knowing the names of officers who would control the new regime. On 8 September, the name of the chief the 12-member revolutionary council was declared; he was the same man who declared the first statement of revolution, Muammar Gaddafi.
- Although the members of the revolutionary council had a high popularity among Libyans, they had to seek raisons d'étre (reasons to justify) their revolution to the nation and to the international community. The revolutionary council began to negotiate the evacuation of the American and British military bases in Libya (including Wheelus Air Base), even though the agreements authorizing these bases, which had been signed by the Kingdom-era officials, would expire by December 1971. The council also maintained that Kingdom officials were corrupt, so a court to try those officials was necessary.

== The Court ==
- Before forming the court, one little problem has faced the new rulers, the charged persons, the Kingdom's officials, have legal rights they’d already gotten by constitution and law. This problem has been partially resolved after issuing the “Constitutional Declaration” on 11 December 1969, which abolished the 1951 constitution of Libya, and put all authorities in the hands revolutionary council's members.
- Then came the problem of looking for the charges. They have the right to accuse any suspect by financial violations, since stealing and bribery are illegal in all countries.
- There was one serious moral problem might have faced them that how can they accuse the kingdom's officials by fabricating the results of elections in the Kingdom era whilst there were no elections run by the new revolutionary regime. This problem has been already resolved by the chief of Council Gaddafi by answering a student of the University of Libya at Benghazi, on 6 November 1969, asking about the time of issuing a new constitution, and whether would be ratified by a popular referendum. "Usually", Gaddafi replied, "The provisional constitution, and the constitutional declaration…will not be ratified by a referendum, because the revolution happened representing the people's will, thus, every thing is done by revolution is representing the people's will..".
- The court's hearings had been broadcast by the Libyan television channel (founded less than one year before the revolution).
- One of the court's judges was a member of the revolutionary council. He is Major Bashir Houadi, the court's chief judge. Sheikh Mahmud Sobhi, a parliament member during the Kingdom era, was also an associate judge. Major Umar Mihayshi, another member of the revolutionary council, represented the attorney-general.
- Some of the defendants haven't denied their political past as officials in the monarchy, like Hussein Maziq, Abdel Aziz El Shalhi, Abdel Hamid Bek Derna (descendant of the Karamanli dynasty), and El Mabrouk El Bassiouni.
- There had been more than 220 defendants faced the accusations at this court in five cases:
1. Fabricating the election's results.
2. Corruption of the royal palaces and the attendants.
3. Corrupting the public opinion.
4. Repressing the popular movements.
5. Corrupting the political life.

== The Verdicts ==
Most of the verdicts were declared in 1971. Some were declared in 1972. Because of the large number of defendants, only a selection of important and high-ranking officials are shown here.

1. King Idris I of Libya: death (in absentia).
2. Queen Fatima Ahmed Sharif es Senussi (in absentia): five years in prison and seizing her property.
3. Crown Prince Hasan as-Senussi: three years in prison.
4. Ahmed al-Senussi: death (later commuted and released in 2001)
5. Idris Ahmed Busaif: seven years in prison.
6. Omar Ibrahim El Shelhi: life-time prison (in absentia) and seizing his property.
7. Abdel Aziz El Shelhi: seven years in prison.
8. Wanis al-Qaddafi: two years in prison.
9. Mustafa Ben Halim: fifteen years in prison (in absentia).
10. Hussein Maziq : ten years in prison and 2000 LD fine.
11. Abdul Hamid al-Bakkoush: four years in prison.
12. Abdul Qadir al-Badri: four years in prison and 4000 LD fine.
13. Sheikh Abdul Rahman El Qalhud: four years in prison and 4000 LD fine (prison's penalty suspended).
14. Kalifa Tillisi: four years in prison and 4000 LD fine (prison's penalty suspended).
15. Fadil Ben Zikri: four years in prison (penalty suspended for five years).
16. Abdel Hamid Bek Derna: five years in prison and 700 LD fine.
17. Es Senussi El Fazzani: three years in prison and 20,000 LD fine.

== Aftermath ==
This was not the only emergency court formed by the revolutionary regime in Libya. Some civilians were tried by the “Special Military Court”. Respecting high officials of the Kingdom era, some of those sentenced were released in 1974, Like Hussein Maziq. Many prisoners (including many other opponents of Gaddafi's regime) were released in March 1988. But some of them remained in prison until 2001, like Ahmed al-Senussi, who was released only after thirty-one years in prison.
