= Sayyid Gaddaf al-Dam =

Libyan military general (1948–2023)

- Born: 1948; Sirte, Libya
- Died: 16 March 2023 (aged 74–75); Cairo, Egypt

Sayyid Mohammed Gaddaf al-Dam (1948 – 16 March 2023) was a Libyan brigadier general and a cousin of late Libyan leader Muammar Gaddafi. He was born in Sirte in 1948. He was one of the Free Officers who participated in the 1969 Libyan coup d'état that brought his cousin Muammar Gaddafi to power. In 1984, he was described as a "shadowy but key figure" and the second most powerful man in Libya according to US intelligence. He was accused of being involved in extrajudicial assassinations of Gaddafi's opponents in Europe as well as arms procurement. In March 1984, Gaddaf al-Dam was injured by a car bomb and may have become disabled. Foreign Minister Ali Treki dismissed the car bomb allegation and claimed that Gaddaf al-Dam had merely been injured in a car accident.

Gaddaf al-Dam was placed under sanctions due to United Nations Security Council Resolution 1970 on 26 February 2011. He was captured in the Battle of Sirte in October 2011. He was acquitted by a court in Misrata of "exploiting state armed forces for political aims" in September 2015 and all other charges against him were dropped.

Allegedly ill with cancer, Gaddaf al-Dam was stretched onto a private plane and flown to La Braq Airport en route to Egypt two weeks after his release. In 2017, he played a role in securing the release of a number of Gaddafi-era figures and announced his support for Saif al-Islam Gaddafi to represent Gaddafi loyalists in national reconciliation efforts. He died in Cairo, Egypt on 16 March 2023.
