= Road to Hope =

2010 humanitarian aid convoy from the UK to Gaza

Road to Hope is the name of a humanitarian aid convoy from the United Kingdom to Gaza, and of the charitable organisation which arranged that convoy.

== Evolution ==
Shortly after the Gaza flotilla raid in the summer of 2010, a group of volunteers with shared experience of previous Viva Palestina land-based convoys to Gaza announced that they would be running a politically independent land convoy (as distinct from the inherently politicised nature of George Galloway's Viva Palestina, and from any further flotilla-like sea-based ventures). Their original stated intention was to coincide with an anticipated second Turkish-led attempt to enter Gaza by sea, thus seeing entry attempted by land and sea simultaneously. The project was conceived by former Viva Palestina volunteer Anwar Benny, and convoy leader on the road was aid worker Kieran Turner (of Aid Convoy). Other notable contributions were made by Gloucester to Gaza, the Waltham Forest branch of the Palestine Solidarity Campaign, and Britain to Gaza of Bristol.

Three days after the Road to Hope announcement, at a pro-Palestinian demonstration outside the Israeli embassy in London, George Galloway announced a new Viva Palestina land convoy, which became known as "Viva Palestina 5". The two projects became aware of each other and each decided that both could run in parallel. When the Turkish-led flotilla failed to happen, the two land convoys would still represent a simultaneous approach of multiple ventures to Gaza.

== Convoy ==
The Road to Hope convoy departed the UK on 10 October 2010 ("10-10-10"), taking with it several volunteers from the Gaza flotilla raid – including seven survivors of the Mavi Marmara – plus other international solidarity organisations. It travelled via France, Spain, Morocco, Algeria, Tunisia, and Libya, before falling victim to internal Libyan political issues together with what was claimed and reported to be the work of a confidence trickster who, they said, told them they would be granted passage through the Egyptian border (normally not possible under Egyptian compliance with the blockade of Gaza) because they would be travelling together with the official Libyan quasi government-run Al Quds 5 convoy — which, as a government-backed enterprise, had exceptional permission to cross Egypt. As a result of the deceit and confusion, Road to Hope became stalled in Libya, where it remained into November 2010.

=== Strofades IV kidnapping incident ===
On 11 November 2010, while boarding the M.V. Strofades IV, a ferry chartered to transport the convoy to Al Arish in Egypt, Road to Hope announced that ten members of the convoy, together with seven Libyan port officials, were kidnapped by the ship's owner, with the willing collaboration of its captain. After several days at sea they were eventually taken via Crete to Greece where Greek commandos raided the ship, resulting in their eventual release because they were found to have committed no crime (following investigations by the Greek police). The captain and owner of the ship were also arrested.

=== Second ship ===
Eventually, with help from a second bout of UK fundraising together with large donations from Libyan individuals, a second ship was secured. This transported the vehicles and a monitoring delegation of three convoy members, while the other convoy members chartered a flight to Al Arish in Egypt.

The convoy reached Rafah and crossed into Gaza on 26 November 2010. Three of the kidnapped members had been able to rejoin by that point. A total of twelve convoy members were denied access to Egypt (and thus through passage to Gaza) for no stated reason — as has happened to previous Viva Palestina convoy members.
