= Libyan Popular National Movement =

Political party in Libya

Libyan Popular National Movement الحركة الوطنية الشعبية الليبية
- Secretary-General: Mustafa al-Zaidi
- Founded: 15 February 2012
- Military wing: Green Resistance
- Ideology: Gaddafi loyalism Third International Theory

Website
- alharaka-alwatania.com

The Libyan Popular National Movement (Arabic: الحركة الوطنية الشعبية الليبية), also known as the National Movement Party (Arabic: حزب الحركة الوطنية), is a political movement and political party established by former Libyan officials on 15 February 2012. Its first Secretary General was Major General Khuwaildi al-Hamidi, a former member of the Revolutionary Command Council whose daughter is married to Al-Saadi Gaddafi, son of former Libyan ruler Muammar Gaddafi. The movement was barred from participating in the 2012 election. After the death of al-Hamidi in 2015, the party was led by Dr. Mustafa al-Zaidi.

== Objectives ==
- Maintaining the territorial integrity of Libya, the safety of its land, and security of its people.
- Working on the release of all prisoners without exception, including Saif al-Islam Gaddafi.
- Treatment and compensation to all victims of war without exception.
- Creating conditions for the return of forcibly displaced people to their towns and villages.
- Building legislative, executive and judiciary institutions of the Libyan state, on the basis of peaceful democracy based on citizenship, without discrimination of ethnic or sectarian, regional or political belief.
- Restoring Libyan sovereignty, ending foreign interference and establishing an independent foreign policy.
- Rejecting policies of exclusion and marginalization in Libyan society.
- Dissolving armed militias, aiding former members to return to their previous jobs.
- Rebuilding public and private properties destroyed during the war without discrimination.
- Investigation of war crimes and crimes against humanity committed during the war, forming courts with public and international control standards to decide on those issues.
- Ensuring the full participation of Libyan citizens, exercising their right to political decision-making, to choose its leaders and the political system in the ways of democracy, under a constitution approved by the Libyan people, without any tutelage or exclusion.
- Using the Quran and the Sunnah in legislation without extremism and fanaticism.
- Urging international and regional organizations to take responsibility for the situation in Libya and halt breaches of the Security Council decisions.

The LPNM declared also their exclusive use of peaceful ways to accomplish their goals, but warned that the continuing repression, killings, torture, and forced displacement will lead to more violence and hatred, and that the LPNM components and its fighters are ready to engage in jihad and armed struggle for the defense of Libya and its citizens if necessary.

The group released another communique on 25 March, condemning the post-war "state of chaos" situation of Libya, the conviction of Libyan citizens in the hands of armed militias, considering their actions as "a flagrant violation of the principles of Sharia and Law", asking for medical, psychological and social assistance for victims of the "bloody events in Libya" and the search of bodies of those killed or disappeared, restoring their dignity. They also denounced a "deliberate media blackout" on the fate of prisoners and displaced people, declaring that the state could not be governed by "extremists groups and merchants of war", involved in "weapons and drug smuggling, rather, and even the white slave trade and money laundering", urging "not to turn Libya into the cause of international tension, and a threat for security and international peace...in the absence of a central authority capable of imposing the rule of law". Finally, the statement concludes that the ongoing violence had converted Libya into a failed state, with towns and regions looking for their own security, leaving national unity apart, and reaffirmed the "falsehood and slander" of foreign media satellite channels that claimed bombing of residential areas by planes, recruitment of mercenaries, and mass killings and rapes by Libyan Army forces in February and March 2011.

A few days later, the LPNM released another statement in which condemned the aerial bombardment of Sabha by NTC militias, which "does not differentiate between civil and non civil", criticizing the silence of the world, compared with the reaction on the claims of Gaddafi bombing civilians, which were defined as "a pure fabrication taken by the West as a pretext for intervention". They denounced the marginalization of Libyan tribes with dark skin, who had been widely presented since the February 2011 events as foreign mercenaries. The LPNM declared their stand with all Libyan tribes without exception, including Toubou and Tuaregs, and ended asking those who "cooperated with NATO to the occupation of their homeland...to return to the barn home".

== Positions towards ethnic minorities in Libya ==
The party denied that the national minorities Amazigh, Toubou and Tuareg were subjected to discrimination under the rule of Gaddafi. In a Facebook post, party leader Mustafa al-Zaidi repeated the Arab nationalist notion that the Amazigh language would be a dialect. Regarding the ban on giving children Amazigh names during the Gaddafi era, he argued, that pagan, Christian and "weird" names were banned as well, including Arab names. In the same post, he strongly argued against Amazigh autonomy, arguing that Libya is a homeland for all. In another Facebook post, al-Zaidi called for burning all Toubou and Amazigh flags.

The party also called the World Amazigh Congress a conspiracy and accused them of working closely with the French secret service.

== See also ==
- List of Islamic political parties
