= 1969 Libyan revolution =

Coup d'état by the Free Officers movement

- Part of the Arab Cold War
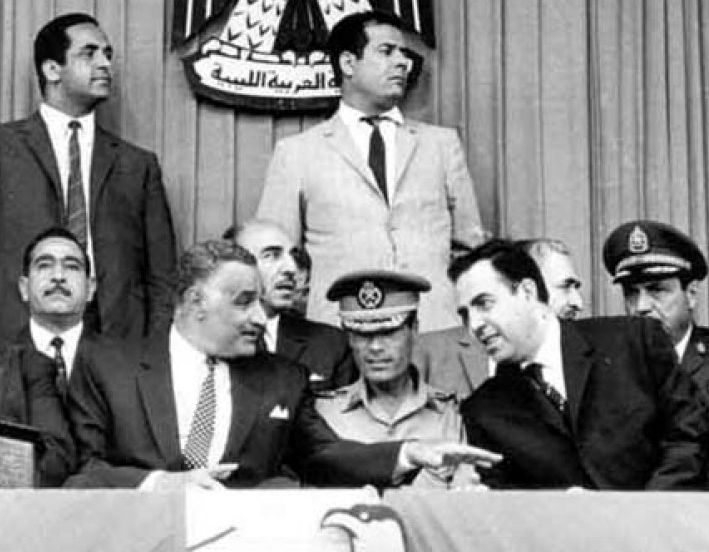
- Gaddafi at an Arab summit in Libya, shortly after the September Revolution that toppled King Idris. Gaddafi sits in military uniform in the middle, surrounded by Egyptian President Gamal Abdel Nasser (left) and Syrian President Nureddin al-Atassi (right)
Date	1 September 1969
Location	Libya
Result	Free Officers victory: Overthrow and abolition of the Monarchy; Establishment of Libyan Arab Republic; Start of Muammar Gaddafi's rule

Belligerents
Kingdom of Libya; Cyrenaican Defence Force (CYDEF)	Free Officers movement

Commanders and leaders
Idris I; Abdel Aziz El Shelhi; Omar Ibrahim El Shelhi; Hasan as-Senussi; Wanis al-Qaddafi; Abdul-Aziz Shennib; Mustafa Ben Halim	Muammar Gaddafi; Abdessalam Jalloud; Umar Muhayshi; Khweldi Hameidi; Bashir Saghir Hawadi; Abu-Bakr Yunis Jabr; Mustafa Kharoubi; Abdel Moneim al-Houni; Mohammed Najm; Abdel Fatah Younis; Khalifa Haftar; Omar El-Hariri; Awad Ali Hamza; Mukhtar Abdullah al-Qarawi; Sayyid Gaddaf al-Dam; Massoud Abdelhafid; Sayyid Gaddaf al-Dam; Ali Treki; Ali Kanna

Strength
Unknown	70

Casualties and losses
0	0

The 1969 Libyan revolution or coup d'état, also known as al-Fateh Revolution or 1 September Revolution, was a coup d'état and revolution carried out by the Free Officers movement, a group of Arab nationalist and Nasserist officers in the Libyan Army, which overthrew the Senussi monarchy of King Idris I and resulted in the formation of the Libyan Arab Republic. The Free Officers movement was led by Colonel Muammar Gaddafi.

The government of Idris was increasingly unpopular by the late 1960s due to internal mismanagement, and the rise of Arab nationalist sentiment further weakened his regime. On 1 September 1969, while Idris was in Turkey, a group of Libyan Army officers under the leadership of Gaddafi launched a coup from Benghazi and quickly established control over the country. The coup was bloodless and received enthusiastic support from the public. Crown prince Hasan as-Senussi relinquished his claim to the throne, and Libya was declared a free and sovereign republic by the Revolutionary Command Council (RCC). Gaddafi, in his capacity as RCC chairman, became the de facto head of state. He would then rule Libya for 42 years until his death in 2011.

== Background ==
The discovery of significant oil reserves in 1959 and the subsequent income from petroleum sales enabled the Kingdom of Libya to transition from one of the world's poorest nations to a wealthy state. Although oil drastically improved the Libyan government's finances, resentment began to build over the increased concentration of the nation's wealth in the hands of King Idris. The kingdom also made little effort in attempting to unite the country and poorly managed Libya's internal affairs. This discontent mounted with the rise of Nasserism, Ba'athism, and Arab nationalism/socialism throughout the Arab world.

By 1969, the US Central Intelligence Agency (CIA) was expecting parts of the Libyan Armed Forces to launch a coup. Although they claimed that they knew of Gaddafi's Free Officers movement, they had since ignored it, stating that they were instead monitoring Abdul Aziz Shelhi's Black Boots revolutionary group. Shelhi, who effectively served as Idris' chief of staff, and his brother Omar were the sons of Idris' longtime chief advisor Ibrahim Shelhi, who had been murdered by Queen Fatima's nephew in the fall of 1954. After their father's assassination, the Shelhi brothers (including another brother, Busiri, who was killed in a car accident in 1964) became the favorites of Idris. The Shelhi family, who was highly influential in Cyrenaica, was considered "utterly corrupt" and Idris' reliance on them caused discontent among the Libyan people.

The British, who had a major military presence in Libya and close ties with Libya's army high command, also considered a coup inevitable. Then British Defence Secretary Denis Healey later wrote in his memoir in 1991 that "it was obvious that the monarchy was likely to fall at any moment to an army coup", and that the Shelhi family would be the most likely to overthrow the monarchy. The British purportedly favored a Shelhi takeover because they feared the Crown Prince, Hasan as-Senussi, would fall under Nasserite influence and Libya would become a client state of Egypt and by extension, the Soviet Union. Thus, the British considered the Shelhi brothers more likely to continue Idris' pro-Western policy.

== Coup ==
By April 1969, the Shelhi brothers further consolidated their power. Abdul Aziz Shelhi had become the Chief of Staff of the Libyan Army and Omar Shelhi became the royal counselor. Omar also married the daughter of a former Prime Minister in an "ostentatious ceremony" that further embittered the Libyan people. In mid-1969, Idris travelled abroad to Turkey and Greece during widespread rumors of a coup by the Shelhi brothers on 5 September. In August 1969, Idris offered to abdicate while on holiday in Greece after reports of the distribution of anti-Idris publications became known to him. Gaddafi's Free Officers recognized 1 September as their chance to overthrow the monarchy before the Shelhi brothers, initiating "Operation Jerusalem".

On 1 September 1969, a group of about 70 young army officers known as the Free Unionist Officers Movement and enlisted men mostly assigned to the Signal Corps gained control of the government and abolished the Libyan monarchy. The coup was launched at Benghazi; and, within two hours, it was completed. Army units quickly rallied in support of the coup and, within a few days, military control was established in Tripoli and elsewhere throughout the country.

The Free Officers occupied airports, police depots, radio stations, and government offices in Tripoli and Benghazi. Gaddafi captured the Barqa barracks in Benghazi, Umar Muhayshi took over Tripoli barracks and Jalloud seized the city's anti-aircraft batteries. Khweldi Hameidi captured the Tripoli radio station and was sent to arrest crown prince Sayyid Hasan ar-Rida al-Mahdi as-Sanussi and force him to give up his claim to the throne. Upon being arrested, Abdul Aziz Shelhi reportedly said, "No, you fools, the coup is not tonight!"

Popular reception of the coup, especially by younger people in the urban areas, was enthusiastic. Fears of resistance in Cyrenaica and Fezzan proved unfounded. No deaths or violent incidents related to the coup were reported.

The Free Officers movement, which claimed credit for carrying out the coup, was headed by a twelve-member directorate that designated itself the Revolutionary Command Council (RCC). This body constituted the Libyan government after the coup. In its initial proclamation on 1 September, the RCC declared the country to be a free and sovereign state called the Libyan Arab Republic, which would proceed "in the path of freedom, unity, and social justice, guaranteeing the right of equality to its citizens, and opening before them the doors of honourable work". The rule of the Turks and Italians and the "reactionary" government which were overthrown were characterised as belonging to "dark ages", from which the Libyan people were called to move forward as "free brothers" to a new age of prosperity, equality, and honour.

People of Libya! In response to your own will, fulfilling your most heartfelt wishes, answering your most incessant demands for change and regeneration, and your longing to strive towards these ends: listening to your incitement to rebel, your armed forces have undertaken the overthrow of the corrupt regime, the stench of which has sickened and horrified us all. At a single blow our gallant army has toppled these idols and has destroyed their images. By a single stroke it has lightened the long dark night in which the Turkish domination was followed first by Italian rule, then by this reactionary and decadent regime which was no more than a hotbed of extortion, faction, treachery and treason.

— Gaddafi's radio speech after seizing power, 1969

The RCC advised diplomatic representatives in Libya that the revolutionary changes had not been directed from outside the country, that existing treaties and agreements would remain in effect, and that foreign lives and property would be protected. Diplomatic recognition of the new government came quickly from countries throughout the world. United States recognition was officially extended on 6 September.

== Post-coup events ==
In view of the lack of internal resistance, it appeared that the chief danger to the new government lay in the possibility of a reaction inspired by the absent King Idris or his designated heir, Hasan ar Rida, who had been taken into custody at the time of the coup along with other senior civil and military officials of the royal government, including Abdul Aziz Shelhi. Within days of the coup, however, Hasan publicly renounced all rights to the throne, stated his support for the new government, and called on the people to accept it without violence.

On 2 September 1969, Omar Shelhi, who had fled Libya, contacted British Foreign Minister Michael Stewart in London and requested British intervention, by force if necessary, but Stewart refused to offer British support. On 5 September 1969, Omar Shelhi travelled to the United States, but received a frosty reception from the Nixon administration and was only received by a middle-ranking US representative at the United Nations. On 4 September 1969, Idris, in an exchange of messages with the RCC through Egypt's President Nasser, dissociated himself from reported attempts by Omar Shelhi to secure British intervention and disclaimed any intention of coming back to Libya. In return, he was assured by the RCC of the safety of his family still in the country. At his own request and with Nasser's approval, Idris took up residence once again in Egypt, where he had spent his first exile and where he remained until his death in 1983.

On 7 September 1969, the RCC announced that it had appointed a cabinet to conduct the government of the new republic. An American-educated technician, Mahmud Sulayman al-Maghribi, who had been imprisoned since 1967 for his political activities, was designated prime minister. He presided over the eight-member Council of Ministers, of whom six, like Maghrabi, were civilians and two – Adam Said Hawwaz and Musa Ahmad – were military officers. Neither of the officers was a member of the RCC. Hawwaz and Ahmad would soon be implicated in a failed coup against the RCC in December 1969.

The Council of Ministers was instructed to "implement the state's general policy as drawn up by the RCC". The next day the RCC promoted Captain Gaddafi to colonel and appointed him commander-in-chief of the Libyan Armed Forces. Although RCC spokesmen declined until January 1970 to reveal any other names of RCC members, it was apparent from that date onward that the head of the RCC and new de facto head of state was Gaddafi.

Analysts were quick to point out the striking similarities between the Libyan military coup of 1969 and that in Egypt under Nasser in 1952, and it became clear that the Egyptian experience and the charismatic figure of Nasser had formed the model for the Free Officers movement. As the RCC in the last months of 1969 moved to institute domestic reforms, it proclaimed neutrality in the confrontation between the superpowers and opposition to all forms of colonialism and imperialism.

It also made clear Libya's dedication to Arab unity and to the support of the Palestinian cause against Israel. The RCC reaffirmed the country's identity as part of the "Arab nation" and its state religion as Islam. Parliamentary institutions from the kingdom were dissolved with legislative functions being assumed by the RCC, and the prohibition against political parties was continued, in effect from 1952.

The new government categorically rejected communism – in large part because it was atheist – and officially espoused an Arab interpretation of socialism that integrated Islamic principles with social, economic, and political reform.

== See also ==
- 1952 Egyptian revolution
- 1969 Libyan coup attempt
- 2013 Libyan coup attempt
- 2014 Libyan coup attempts
- Cultural Revolution in Libya
