= International Organization for Peace, Care and Relief =

Libyan non-governmental organization

- Abbreviation: IOPCR
- Formation: 1999
- Type: Non-governmental organization (NGO)
- Legal status: Special consultative status with the Economic and Social Council of the United Nations
- Purpose: Humanitarian
- Headquarters: Tripoli, Libya
- Region served: International
- President: Khaled K. El-Hamedi
- Website: iopcr.org

The International Organization for Peace, Care and Relief (IOPCR) is a non-governmental organization based in Tripoli, Libya. Founded in 1999, the organization has special Consultative Status with the Economic and Social Council of the United Nations (ECOSOC) and has an independent legal and financial status. The president of the organization is Khaled K. El-Hamedi, a son of Libyan former Major General Khweldi Hameidi.

IOPCR joining Viva Palestina's first convey that was crossing Libya in March 2009

== Background ==
IOPCR was founded to act in different humanitarian fields, with aims to address issues relating to peace, stability and prosperity.

Its objectives are to:

- Promote a just international peace that respects peoples social and cultural differences.
- Condemn all forms of aggression and military conflicts against peoples and to denounce their instigators.
- Contradict all forms of collective deportations and forced migration, therefore to defend and to strengthen the rights of individuals that guarantee them a home country in which they can live in peacefully and securely.
- Contradict the production and use of all forms of weapons, in particular weapons of mass destruction, while requesting belligerent countries to disclose information about their planted mines.
- Provide the protection to refugees (groups and/or individuals) until a safe repatriation is made possible for them.
- Enlighten the world opinion about environment damages and their impact on human health and quality of future generation's life.
- Cooperate with all organizations and institutions that have similar objectives.

== Administrative organs ==
The General Assembly is the highest authority of the organization whose members are both individuals and artificial persons that includes the founding members, the organizers and the observers as identified by the General Assembly and the administration is organized as follows:

- The organization's General Assembly
- The Executive Bureau
- Secretariats of Local and International Branches
- Technical Divisions

== Activities ==
IOPCR volunteers taking care of illegal immigrants in an accommodation center in Misrata, Libya in February 2007

Since its establishment the organization engaged individually or with cooperation with other organizations in different humanitarian issues aiming to accomplish its objectives in various fields.

The organization has acted in partnership with the United Nations High Commissioner for Refugees, the United Nations Relief and Works Agency for Palestinian refugees and others in the illegal migration across the Mediterranean and refugees cases. They have also participated in a number of international conferences and assembles concerning these issues, helping to provide the protection and to address these problems.

- Providing humanitarian aids to places that have been inflicted by natural disasters such as the earthquakes that hit Algeria, Iran, Darfur and Kassala - Sudan, and the 2004 Indian Ocean earthquake and tsunami.
- Sending its delegations to approach victims of conflicts and war zones in different regions like Bosnia, Afghanistan, and helping in handling the issue of Kuwaiti prisoners of war (POWs) and those missing in action during the invasion of Kuwait in 2002, and after that in 2003 IOPCR sent its delegations accompanied with a plane loaded with humanitarian assistants to the Iraqis whom where affected by the Iraq War, also organized air conveys of aids and assistance to the Palestinian people as well as donating a number of ambulances to hospitals and health centers in Gaza Strip - Palestine and joined the Viva Palestina convey with trucks loaded with tons of assistance, also helped survivors from the sinking of the Egyptian ferry Al-Salam Boccaccio 98.

In March 2010 the IOPCR launched from Tripoli, Libya, the humanitarian campaign to support the Palestinian people, a fraternity program between the Libyan and Palestinian families under the patronage of the organization that was signed on January 10, 2010, in Gaza between the president of IOPCR Khaled El Hamedi and the Palestinian Prime Minister Ismail Haniyeh during the organizations delegation's trip to Gaza.

== Partners ==
The arrival of IOPCR's humanitarian aids for the Palestinian people to Al-Arish Airport on January 15, 2009

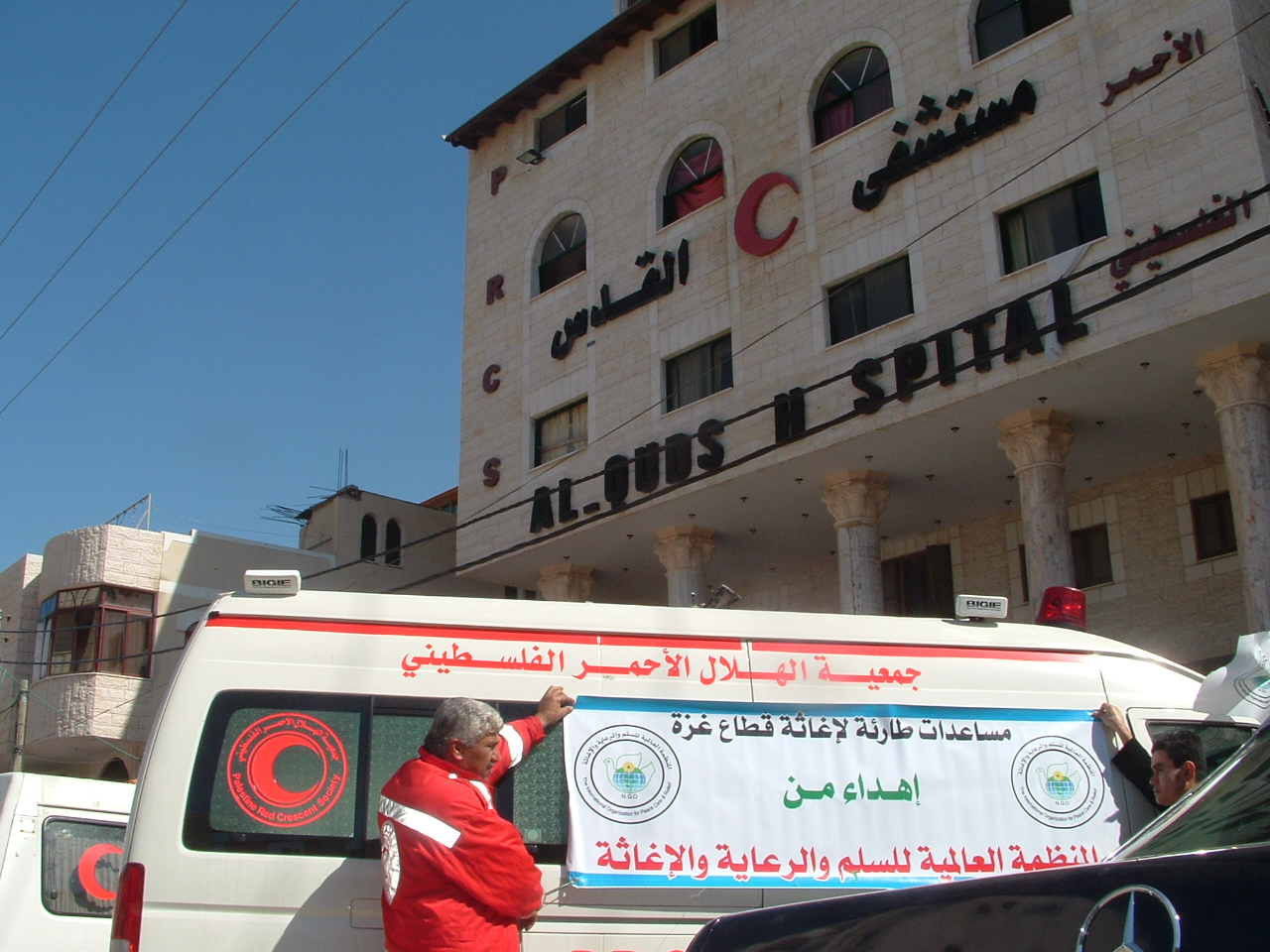
IOPCR donated ambulance vans to a number of Palestinian hospitals and Health centers in March 2009

- The United Nations High Commissioner for Refugees (UNHCR)
- The International Centre for Migration Policy Development (ICMPD)
- The Italian Council for Refugees (CIR)
- The United Nations Relief and Works Agency for Palestine Refugees in the Near East (UNRWA)
- The Organization of the Islamic Conference (OIC]
- Doctors Without Borders/Médecins Sans Frontières (MSF)
- The International Organization for Migration (IOM)
