= Workers' Aid for Bosnia =

- Successor: Workers Aid for Kosova
- Formation: 1993; 33 years ago
- Dissolved: 1996; 30 years ago
- Purpose: Humanitarian
- Location: United Kingdom
- Region served: Bosnia and Herzegovina
- Parent organization: Campaign Against Fascism in Europe

Workers' Aid for Bosnia (sometimes abbreviated to "Workers' Aid") was founded in London, United Kingdom in 1993, after a call by the Campaign Against Fascism in Europe (CAFE). Sixty people – socialists, trade unionists and Bosnian refugees – met to discuss how to organise solidarity with those people in ex-Yugoslavia defending a united, multi-ethnic Bosnia and Herzegovina. Workers' Aid was supported by the International Socialist Group, the USFI, and the Workers Revolutionary Party (Workers Press). However, there was rivalry between these groupings which did not help the solidarity project.

== Background ==
At the founding meeting a letter was read out from a Serbian opponent of Serb nationalism. It appealed for workers in Britain to take food to the mining communities of Tuzla, the multi-ethnic bastion of Bosnia and Herzegovina that had been under siege by nationalist forces for many months. This became its first major activity. Steve Myers of CAFE, one of the initiators of Workers' Aid for Bosnia, was elected International Coordinator, and this later grew to involve liaising with workers organisations and convoys from Sweden, Denmark, Germany, France, Hungary and Italy.

In Britain it began as an appeal for volunteers, money and food. Meetings were held throughout the country appealing for support from the trade unions and the working class movement. It bought its first lorry with money donated by the Muslim Solidarity Campaign. Once further lorries were available, they travelled in convoys. What distinguished Workers Aid from other humanitarian charities and NGOs was its explicit political stance. It advocated the raising of the UN imposed aid and arms embargo, which effectively left the Bosnians defenceless against the much better armed Serb nationalists. As part of this, whilst passing through Zagreb, Croatia, ten lorries of the convoy blockaded the UN military compound and appeared on national Croatian TV, demanding the lifting of the arms embargo.

Workers' Aid did not see the war as a civil war between warring tribalisms, but a specific political project driven by western interference, Greater Serb nationalism and, to a lesser extent, Croatian nationalism. Workers Aid never saw itself as a charity, but as a campaigning organisation aiming to catalyse a response from the broader labour movement across Europe.

== Legacy ==
The group continued its work in the former Yugoslavia, first visiting Kosovo in January 1996. Under its new name, Workers Aid for Kosova (Kosova is the Albanian name of Kosovo), it was one of the first organisations to take aid to Kosovo during the NATO intervention of July 1999. During July and August of that year they supported miners in and around Kosovska Mitrovica and Pristina, and – with support from the students' representative council of the University of Aberdeen together with Aid Convoy – supplied the students' union of the University of Pristina. A film exists of this trip, entitled simply Convoy, and made by Rachel Robertson, a member of the convoy team.

Later, some of Workers' Aid members went on to other political campaigns, such as Reclaim the Streets and the Liverpool Dockers' Strike. Others became involved with mainstream charitable organisations, or ran other organisations such as Aid Convoy, which continues to work in neighbouring Albania as well as other countries. Many individual trade union branches and members also took practical solidarity action.

== See also ==
- Humanitarian aid
