= Viva Palestina =

British-based registered charity to the Gaza Strip

Viva Palestina ("Long live Palestine") is a British-based organisation formerly registered as a charity. The body came into being in January 2009 with the initial intention of running a convoy of humanitarian aid to the Gaza Strip. Its aims are the "provision from the UK of food, medicine and essential goods and services needed by the civilian population" [of the occupied Palestinian Territories] and "highlighting the causes and results of wars with a view to achieving peace."

== Background ==
Viva Palestina was established during the Gaza War in January 2009 by a group including British politician George Galloway.

== First convoy (early 2009) ==
On 14 February 2009, after raising over £1 million-worth of humanitarian aid in under four weeks, hundreds of volunteers launched the first convoy comprising approximately 110 vehicles intended for use in Gaza. Among these were a fire engine donated by the Fire Brigades Union (FBU), twelve ambulances, a boat and trucks full of medicines, tools, clothes, blankets and gifts for children. The 5,000-mile route passed through Belgium, France, Spain, Morocco, Algeria, Tunisia, Libya and Egypt.

On 20 February, Galloway condemned Lancashire Police after they arrested nine of the volunteers under the Terrorism Act a day before the convoy's launch. He said: "The arrests were clearly deliberately timed for the eve of the departure of the convoy. Photographs of the high-profile snatch on the M65 were immediately fed to the press to maximise the newsworthiness of the smear that was being perpetrated on the convoy." Viva Palestina reported an 80% drop in donations following the BBC's broadcast of the arrests and allegations. All those arrested were subsequently released without charge.

Iranian television news channel Press TV travelled with the convoy via embedded reporters, while Hassan Ghani and Yvonne Ridley made a documentary about it.

The convoy arrived in Gaza via the Rafah crossing on 9 March 2009, accompanied by approximately 180 extra trucks of aid donated by Libya's Gaddafi Foundation and the International Organization for Peace, Care and Relief (IOPCR). These trucks were not allowed to cross with the British convoy and were re-directed through Israel. Not all of the British aid was delivered. At Al-Arish the Egyptian authorities searched all vehicles taking any aid it did not deem to be medical. All vehicles, however, did make it across with the exception of the fire engine and boat which were also blocked by the Egyptian government. The boat is to be delivered later in a flotilla of craft which Viva Palestina intends to take into Gaza harbour. The convoy was led overall by Kevin Ovenden. On its return home, it was welcomed by supporters.

== United States airborne "convoy" (mid 2009) ==
A delegation from the US, in addition to UK-based organisers, was flown to Egypt. Israel then allowed a "convoy of 200 U.S. activists ... to cross into the Gaza Strip via Egypt on" 17 July 2009. Much of their aid (including 33 small Chinese-built Geeley 1.6-litre petrol-engined sedan cars) was refused entry. The operation was figure-headed by George Galloway and Vietnam War veteran Ron Kovic.

The Anti-Defamation League expressed concerns that the convoy would aid Hamas and requested the US Justice Department to investigate. To allay fears that the US volunteers would encounter legal difficulties upon their return home, Hamas agreed to allow the aid to be delivered directly to non-governmental organisations (NGOs) rather than through their government.

== Third convoy (late 2009) ==
On 6 December 2009, the third Viva Palestina Convoy departed from London. This convoy, the second to leave the UK by road, was made up of volunteers from several countries. It collected additional support in Istanbul and Damascus), and travelled via France, Belgium, Luxembourg, Germany, Austria, Italy, Greece, Turkey, Syria, Jordan, back through Syria again, and finally Egypt before entering Gaza via Rafah. The intended date of entry was 27 December 2009, the one-year anniversary of the 2008–2009 Israel–Gaza conflict, but actual entry took place on 7 January 2010.

On 5 January 2010, scuffles broke out between members of the convoy and Egyptian police in Al-Arish after part of the convoy was barred from entering Gaza. The following day, during solidarity protests at the Rafah border held by Palestinians in Gaza awaiting the convoy's arrival, violence erupted resulting in the hospitalisation of at least three Palestinians and the death of an Egyptian policeman.

On 7 January, it was reported by Democracy Now! – along with an interview with Galloway – that the convoy had successfully crossed the Egyptian border with Gaza and was beginning to hand out medicine.

On 8 January, George Galloway was deported from Egypt and declared persona non grata. Egyptian Foreign Minister Ahmed Aboul Gheit described the aid convoy as "farcical" and said the country would no longer allow such solidarity convoys into the Hamas-run coastal area.

== Announcements ==
Late in 2009, Viva Palestina founder George Galloway said that he was planning more Viva Palestina convoys. "Next year we will bring a Viva Palestina Hugo Chavez convoy from Venezuela, maybe one from Iran which we are currently discussing. And people from other countries such as Australia and South Africa are also asking if they can get involved".

Subsequently, in an 11 January 2010 interview with Anas Tikriti on British-based Arabic diaspora television channel Al Hiwar, Galloway said that the Chavez link was less likely to happen than it had been, but that Viva Palestina would enter Gaza harbour by sea. This is similar to projects of the Free Gaza Movement.

== Turkish-led Gaza flotilla (mid 2010) ==
Fatima Mohammadi, Kevin Ovenden and Nicola Enchmarch of Viva Palestina were on board ships of the 2010 Gaza flotilla raided by the Israelis. The flotilla was organised with the charitable Turkish IHH organisation. The IHH sent the MV Mavi Marmara, also carrying Viva Palestina delegates, on which nine people were killed by Israeli commandos. The Free Gaza Movement, which had experience of sending boats previously, sent the MV Rachel Corrie.

== Further convoys (late 2010) ==
Shortly after the flotilla, in summer 2010, a group of previous Viva Palestina volunteers announced that they would be running a politically independent land convoy with the intention of coinciding with an anticipated second Turkish-led attempt to enter Gaza by sea. Three days after this announcement, at a pro-Palestinian demonstration outside the Israeli embassy in London, George Galloway announced a new Viva Palestina land convoy to coincide with yet another attempt to enter Gaza by sea.

The two projects progressed with the former becoming the Road to Hope convoy, which departed the UK on 10 October 2010, taking with it several volunteers from the IHH flotilla, plus other international solidarity organisations, and travelled via France, Spain, Morocco, Algeria, Tunisia, and Libya, before falling victim to what they claimed was the work of a confidence trickster who, they said, told them they would be granted passage through the Egyptian border (normally not possible) because they would be travelling together with the official Libyan "Al Quds 5" convoy which, as a government convoy, had exceptional permission. As a result of the deceit and confusion, Road to Hope became stalled in Libya, where it remained into November 2010. On 11 November 2010, while boarding a ferry intended to transport the convoy to Al Arish in Egypt, Road To Hope alleged that 10 members of the convoy were kidnapped by the ship's captain. They were taken to Greece where they were released several days later.

The latter project became Viva Palestina's "Lifeline 5" (although, in fact, the fourth convoy organised by Viva Palestina), which departed the UK on 18 September 2010 and travelled via Greece, Turkey, and Syria, in conjunction with partners including the European Campaign to End the Siege on Gaza. On 13 October, with the support of Syrian and other authorities, the ferry carrying medical aid (along with educational supplies, material to build an orphans' school, and a maternity unit in Beit Hanoun in northern Gaza) was eventually allowed by the Egyptian authorities to dock in Al Arish and thence allowed to pass through the Rafah crossing. More than 10 convoy members were denied access. It successfully reached Gaza and delivered its aid.

== Aid recipients and investigations ==
While in Gaza, AFP reported that Viva Palestina donated more than 100 vehicles carrying aid worth more than 1.4 million US dollars to the Hamas-run government in the Gaza Strip. Financial support for Hamas is unlawful in Canada, the United States and most of the EU, because of Hamas' classification as a terrorist organisation. The Anti-Defamation League sent an open letter to the US Department of Justice asking that they open an investigation. Britain's Charity Commission concluded that there was no evidence that the Charity's property was provided to Hamas.

The Charity Commission's inquiry found that Viva Palestina was a charity because the Founding Trustee's attempts to amend the purposes of the Charity so that it became a non-charitable organisation were not legally effective. It concluded that there was no evidence that the Charity's property was provided to Hamas based on the material it examined. It found that the Charity had misled the public by claiming to have raised over £1 million during the first convoy because this amount included the estimated value of the goods raised during the course of the convoy which were donated on arrival in Gaza. It concluded that mismanagement in the administration of a charity had exposed the Charity's funds to unnecessary risk.

The Commission removed its recognition of the organisation as a charity in November 2013. Ron McKay, George Galloway's press spokesman, was ordered to provide accounts from 2009 onwards in September, but, as he is not a trustee, he has appealed against the ruling on the grounds that he is unable to comply. It was taken over by the Charity Commission in October 2014 who appointed an accountant to oversee the group.
