= Mahmud Suleiman Maghribi =

Libyan politician (1935–2009)

Mahmud Sulayman al-Maghribi محمود سليمان المغربي

Prime Minister of Libya
- In office 8 September 1969 – 16 January 1970
- Leader: Muammar Gaddafi
- Preceded by: Wanis al-Qaddafi
- Succeeded by: Muammar Gaddafi

Personal details
- Born: 29 November 1935 Haifa, British Mandate for Palestine
- Died: 17 July 2009 (aged 73) Damascus, Syria
- Education: George Washington University

Mahmud Sulayman al-Maghribi (Arabic: محمود سليمان المغربي; 29 November 1935 – 17 July 2009) was the Prime Minister of Libya from 8 September 1969 to 16 January 1970.

== Biography ==
Maghribi was born and raised in Haifa before moving to Syria in 1948.

Maghribi worked at the ministry of education in Qatar while studying law at Damascus University before gaining his PhD in petroleum law at George Washington University in the United States in 1966. In his PhD thesis, he argued that it would be "unwise" for a country to nationalize oil production on its own.

From there he moved to Libya and initiated a strike among the country's petroleum workers in 1967 against foreign exploitation of Libyan resources, for which he was sentenced to four year imprisonment and stripped of his Libyan nationality.

He was the first prime minister of Libya after the revolution in 1969. He was Minister of Treasury from 1969 to 1970. He later represented Libya at the United Nations from 1970 before moving to London as Libyan ambassador to the UK. He left the embassy in October 1976, but remained in London working as a legal consultant. He retired to Damascus in 2008.

He co-founded 'the Children of Palestine' in Syria in 1950. The organisation fought for and won the rights of Palestinians in Syria and his fondness of Syria and belief in pan-Arab unity remained strong throughout his life.

He died on 17 July 2009, survived by his wife, three daughters and a grandson.

== Ministers ==
Minister of Defense Adam al-Hawaz
Minister of Interior Musa Ahmed
Minister of Finance, Agriculture and Agrarian Reform Mahmud Suleiman Maghribi
Minister of Labor and Affairs Anis Ahmed Shteiwi
Minister of Oil Anis Ahmed Shteiwi
Minister of Unity and Foreign Affairs Salah Busir
Minister of Education and National Guidance Mohamed al-Shetwi
