= Mohammed Najm =

Libyan military officer (1943–2016)

- Najm in 1971
- Born: 1943; Benghazi, Cyrenaica, Italian Libya
- Died: December 13, 2016 (aged 72–73); Tunis, Tunisia
- Education: Benghazi Military University Academy
- Occupations: Major, diplomat, and judge

Libyan Minister of Foreign Affairs
- In office October 16, 1970 – February 1972
- Prime Minister: Muammar Gaddafi
- Preceded by: Salah Busir
- Succeeded by: Mansour Rashid El-Kikhia

Mohammed Emhamed Awad Najm (Arabic: محمد امحمد عوض نجم; 1943 – 13 December 2016; also transliterated as Muhammad Nejm) was a Libyan military officer and political figure. He was one of the original twelve members of the Libyan Revolutionary Command Council (RCC) and also served as the Libyan foreign minister.

== Biography ==
Born and raised in Benghazi, Najm graduated from the Benghazi Military University Academy in 1963. He was a leading figure in the 1969 Libyan coup d'état that overthrew King Idris and brought Gaddafi to power. In addition to being part of the RCC, he also served as chairman of the court in the trial of former Minister of Defense, Lieutenant Colonel Adam al‐Hawaz, and former Minister of Interior, Lieutenant Colonel Ahmed Moussa, who was accused of plotting a coup to overthrow the RCC, in April 1970.

Najm served as Minister of Foreign Affairs and Unity from October 1970 to February 1972. He then played a leading role in Gaddafi's Cultural Revolution, partaking in activities such as leading a "People's Committee" of youth to seize a radio station in Tripoli. He quit the RCC in 1973 due to Gaddafi favoring members of his own tribe, the Qadhadhfa, for promotions.

After a series of disagreements with Gaddafi, Najm withdrew from politics in the late 1970s and lived as an ordinary citizen in his hometown of Benghazi. In May 2002, he was involved in a car accident and fractured one of his spine vertebrae. He subsequently spent a long time undergoing treatment and rehabilitation in Switzerland. During the First Libyan Civil War in July 2011, it was reported that Najm had defected to the National Transitional Council. Najm went to Tunisia for medical treatment in late 2016 and died in a hospital in Tunis on 13 December 2016.
