= Khaled K. El-Hamedi =

Khaled K. El-Hamedi خالد الخويلدي الحميدي
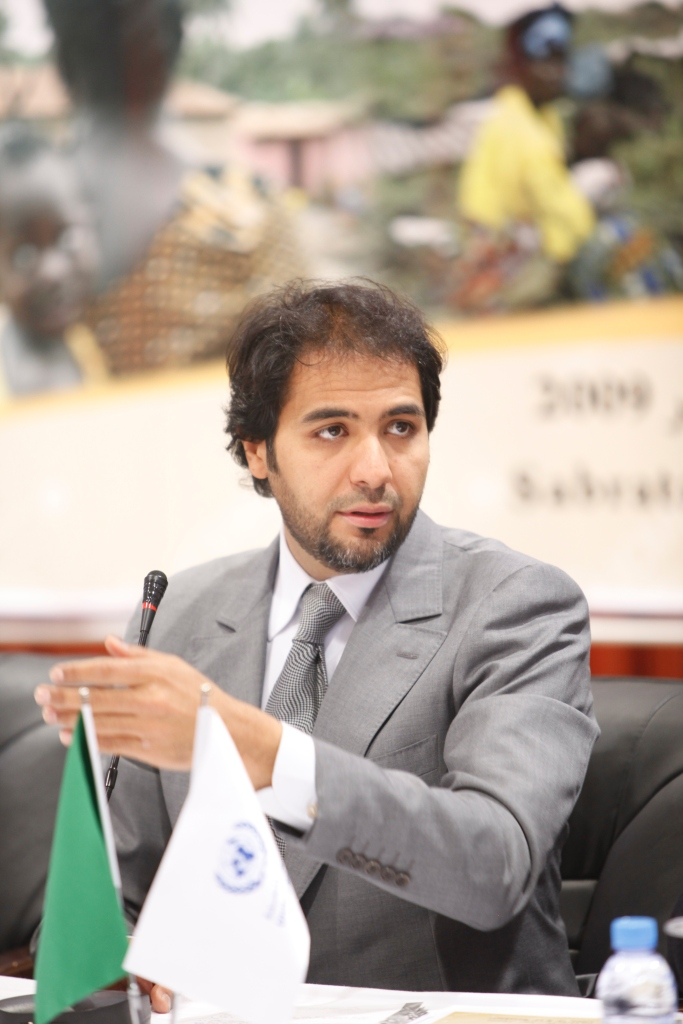

President of the International Organization for Peace, Care and Relief
- Incumbent
- Assumed office 2002

Personal details
- Born: 31 December 1973 (age 52) Tripoli, Libya

Khaled El-Khweldi El-Hamedi (Arabic: خالد الخويلدي الحميدي; born 31 December 1973) is a Libyan humanitarian peace activist and the founder of the Tripoli-based NGO International Organization for Peace, Care and Relief (IOPCR). He also has a degree in computer engineering. He is the son of Major General Khweldi Hameidi.

== Early life and education ==
El-Hamedi was born on 31 December 1973 in Tripoli, Libya. He grew up in the city and received his Bachelor of Engineering Science with a major in computing in 1996 from the Faculty of Engineering at Tripoli's AlFatah University. In 2001 he obtained a master's degree in business administration in Telecommunications from the International University in Geneva, Switzerland, having passed with high distinction. • El-Hamedi has established the National Consulting and Inspection Bureau in the year 1997, and developed the National Bureau to become a holding company

== Humanitarian activities ==
As president of IOPCR, a non-governmental organization (NGO) with special consultative status on the Economic and Social Council (ECOSOC) of the United Nations (UN),[2] El-Hamedi stimulated the activities of the organization in many humanitarian fields around the globe. In March 2002, he went to Kuwait to help handle the issue of Kuwaiti prisoners of war and those reported missing in action during the Iraq War, as well as heading the 'No to war, Yes to peace' Campaign to deliver aid to the children of Iraq. He also raised a tent at the Rafah Border Crossing on the Egyptian – Palestine border under the slogan 'Stop The Bleeding' as a protest over Israel's January 2009 invasion of the Gaza Strip.[6] IOPCR has engaged in various forms of aid work in Algeria, Iran, Pakistan, Egypt, Sudan, Bosnia as well as made local contributions to different care centers throughout Libya such as orphanages and homes for the elderly. During recent years El-Hamedi has achieved agreements with a number of International Organizations working in the field of humanitarian relief such as The United Nations High Commissioner for Refugees (UNHCR), The International Centre for Migration Policy Development (ICMPD), The Italian Council for Refugees (CIR),[9] The United Nations Relief and Works Agency for Palestine Refugees (UNRWA), The Organization of the Islamic Conference (OIC),[10] – Doctors Without Borders / Médecins Sans Frontières (MSF), The International Islamic Relief Organization (IR), and The International Organization for Migration (IOM).[11] In cooperation with the UNHCR he has made illegal migration among the top priorities of the organization[12][13][14] along with handling refugees cases in partnership with (UNRWA).[15] The intervention in Libya on 17 March 2011.

== Libyan issue ==
the UN Security Council passed Resolution 1973, spearheaded by the administration of U.S. president Barack Obama, authorizing military intervention in Libya. On 19 March 2011, a multi-state NATO-led coalition began a military intervention in Libya. The military operations began, with American and British naval forces firing over 110 Tomahawk cruise missiles, the French Air Force, British Royal Air Force, and Royal Canadian Air Force undertaking sorties across Libya and a naval blockade by Coalition forces. French jets launched air strikes against Libyan Army tanks and vehicles. The U.N. Security Council canceled its authorization for a seven-month-old NATO military operation in Libya that led to the killing of Libyan leader Muammar Gaddafi and destroying the country and turn it into an armed rebel war zone, NATO concluded their intervention in Libya on 31 October 2011.

== Court case against NATO ==
Khaled El Hamedi demanded that NATO to be held accountable for the annihilation of his entire family, in October 2011 Khaled submitted a case to the Brussels Court of First Instance demanding that the Court rules that NATO was to be held responsible for the killing of his family during the attack on his house in June 2011. NATO declined the jurisdiction of the Belgian Courts and invoked the immunity granted in the 1951 Ottawa agreement that established NATO. The Belgian government, however, decided to intervene in the case to speak on behalf of NATO. In October 2012 the Court of First Instance upheld NATO's immunity and dismissed the demand of Khaled El Hamedi. The latter appealed for the accountability in line with both national and international laws, In particular the immunity of NATO is in violation of the right of access to a Court, enshrined i.a. in the European Human Rights Convention and other international human rights and instruments.

The Belgian Court of Cassation decided that immunity of international organisations can be waived if the latter do not set up an internal mechanism accessible for citizens who suffered harm as a result of the actions undertaken by the organisation. NATO does not have such mechanism in relation to its actions in Libya.

Unfortunately, the Brussels Court of Appeal decided on 23 November 2017 to uphold the immunity of NATO missing thus a historic opportunity to make a big leap forward in the enforcement of international human rights law and international humanitarian law. The Brussels Court of Appeal decide that the immunity granted to NATO was an acceptable restriction of the right to access to a Court. The immunity, according to the Court of Appeal was proportionate to the aim pursued by it: allow an international organisation to realise its goals. In order to take that decision, the Brussels Appeal Court relied on Dutch case law regarding immunity for UN bleu helmets the Association of Victims of NATO and War on Libya

Beginning of 2018 Khaled ElHamedi officially announced in his capacity as the president the formation of The Association of the Victims of NATO and War on Libya ( ANVWL) an NGO defending human rights, in general, and Libyan citizen human rights, in particular, supporting the rights of the families that sustained damage from the military intervention of NATO war against Libya in 2011 through enlightening the international community of what really happened in Libya aiming to recognize the rights of war victims to address and support their legal rights to pursue war criminals which are based on international agreements and declarations, humanity values and principles and the traditions of civilized nations and peoples.

The activities of the association shall be complementary to the activities and roles of human rights networks worldwide that seek to enhance human rights, the association will be networking to gain different alliances for boosting the rights of the intervention of NATO victims in Libya

The association will also focus on building and archiving a database for the all victims of NATO and war crimes and those who were victims of crimes against humanity that were committed against Libyans during the NATO intervention in Libya in addition to establishing a legal center specialized in defending the rights of those victims and support their legal cases across the globe with building awareness and sit the mechanism for doing so

Khaled El Hamedi will therefore continue his fight for accountability for NATO for the injustice inflicted upon his family. The legal team is examining the possibility for further legal action in Belgium and if necessary in the European Court of Human Rights. But Khaled's struggle opens also the road for all other victims of NATO. That is why Khaled decided to establish with many others who suffered from NATO crimes in Libya, the Association of Victims of NATO and War on Libya

== Honors ==
- In Ramallah – Palestine, in December 2009, the Palestinian president Mahmoud Abbas granted Khaled El-Hamedi The Decoration of Al-Quds in the first degree in recognition of his humanitarian efforts and support for the Palestinian People.
- In the Gaza Strip – Palestine, in January 2010, the prime minister of the Palestinian National Authority Ismail Haniyeh granted the Medal of courage to the president of the organization for breaking the siege of the Gaza Strip at (The Conscience of the World) tent that witnessed the signing of the fraternity program between Palestinian and Libyan families.

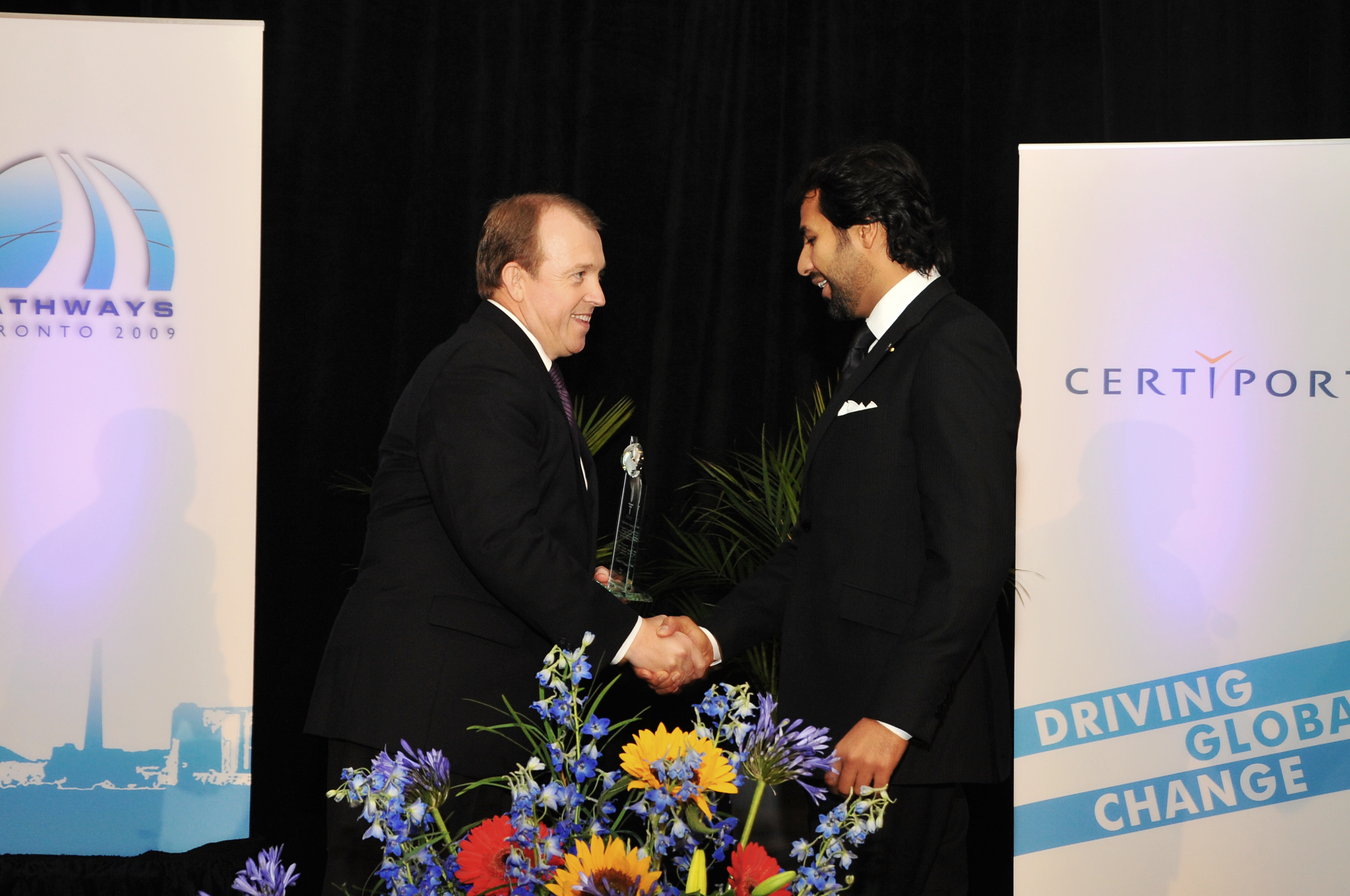

- Khaled El Hamedi recognizes the necessity of digital literacy skills for success in today’s technological world. His efforts to bridge the Digital Divide in his native Libya have led to the building of 70 Certiport training centers throughout the country and the certification of 30,000 individuals in Certiport Internet Computing Core Certification (IC³®) since 2004.
