= Libyan Revolutionary Command Council =

Government of Libya, 1969–1977

Revolutionary Command Council مجلس قيادة الثورة
- Coat of arms of the Libyan Arab Republic (1969–1972)
- Formation: 1 September 1969
- Dissolved: 2 March 1977
- Type: Acting Presidency; Collective leadership
- Legal status: Dissolved by the proclamation of Jamahiriya. Replaced by the GPC.
- Headquarters: Tripoli, Libya
- Region served: Libyan Arab Republic
- Chairman: Muammar Gaddafi
- Affiliations: Presidency of Libya; Libyan Army; Parliament

The Revolutionary Command Council (Arabic: مجلس قيادة الثورة) was a twelve-member governing body that ruled the Libyan Arab Republic after the 1969 Libyan coup d'état by the Free Officers Movement, which overthrew the Senussi monarchy of King Idris I. The council's chairman was Muammar Gaddafi, who had the most influence and served as Libya's de facto head of state as Revolutionary Chairman of the Libyan Arab Republic and commander-in-chief of the armed forces. It was ideologically Arab nationalist, republican, anti-imperialist and pan-Arabist.

In 1977, the Libyan Arab Republic was abolished and Socialist People's Libyan Arab Jamahiriya was established. As a part of this, the RCC was officially abolished and replaced by the general secretariat of the General People's Congress, primarily guided through the beliefs and teachings later published in Muammar Gaddafi’s Green Book.

== Ideology ==
The RCC was established with the purpose of being a system which Gaddafi would refer to as a solution to the instruments of government. Gaddafi was a proponent of direct democracy, seeing an electoral system where 49% could oppose the winning candidate as inherently misguided. Gaddafi also detested the idea of creating constituencies, as he viewed it as impossible to find one individual to represent populations of anywhere between hundreds or millions of people. Along the same lines, it was the belief of the RCC that political parties would lead to internal strife, something which would, and has, harmed the nation's ability to succeed.

The RCC had to reckon with the existing tribal hierarchy that had been established in Libya. Originally, the RCC had qualms with the large tribes, viewing them as the bourgeois of Libyan society. As a result of the strong tribal structure, many public officials, such as mayors, were themselves tribal leaders or related to them. In turn, the RCC had them removed. This was the first step in an attempt to keep tribalism out of the politics of the new Libya, as it garnered similar criticism from Gaddafi as political parties did. In reality, Gaddafi faced challenges from the deeply integrated tribalism that could not simply be solved by removing the perpetrators from power. One of these challenges came in the form of a failed coup led by the Sayf al Nasr tribe in July 1970. In order to quell the resistance of the tribes, Gaddafi started to equally distribute bureaucratic positions between the tribes, continually reinforcing tribalism.

== Structure ==
In April 1973, Gaddafi revealed large-scale structural changes that would be implemented within the RCC. With these changes, he hoped he would spur a ‘popular revolution’. Part of this was the push to increase political mobilization through people’s committees. After the announcement of the popular revolution in April, over 2000 popular committees had been established by fall. The people’s committees were intended to act as a method for the general public to have access to political representation, as they were formed through schools, workplaces, communities, and all funneled up to the General People’s Congress, where Gaddafi sat as the General Secretary.

== History ==
In its early years, Libya relied heavily on income from foreign, particularly American and British, air bases. This resulted in a heavy willingness to concede and cooperate with Western nations. In years after, Libya gained a great deal of its importance in independence due to oil reserves discovered a decade prior to the revolution. The nation produced 2.6 million barrels of oil a day in 1968, placing them in league with Saudi Arabia and Iran as one of the top producers. Although Libya had become much more financially independent, the regime still found itself unable to remove western involvement in the nation through air bases. Libya continued to ramp up oil production, leveraging their relationship with the United States by vowing to protect foreign oil interests so that by 1974, the population had a significantly better standard of living.

As a result of the 1969 Libyan coup d'état led by Gaddafi, the 12-member central committee of the Free Officers Movement converted themselves into a Revolutionary Command Council (RCC), which governed the newly established Libyan Arab Republic. Below them was formed a council of ministers, headed by Mahmud Suleiman Maghribi, to oversee the implementation of RCC policy.

The RCC was instantly recognized by the Arab nationalist governments of Egypt, Iraq, Sudan and Syria. Egypt sent experts to support the Revolutionary Command Council which lacked experience. Gaddafi expressed Pan-Arabism, announcing the need for one united Arab state in the Middle East and North Africa. He proposed the establishment of the Federation of Arab Republics in 1972 with Egypt and Syria. It was approved by 98.6% of voters in Libya with a referendum on 1 September 1971.

Captain Gaddafi was promoted to the rank of colonel, and was recognized as both chairman of the RCC as well as the commander-in-chief of the armed forces, becoming the de facto head of state. From 1970 to 1972, he also served as prime minister. The RCC was declared the highest authority in the Libyan Arab Republic with the ability to exercise both executive and legislative functions.

Although the RCC was theoretically a collegial body that operated through discussion and consensus building, from the start it was dominated by the opinions and decisions of Gaddafi, although some of the others attempted to constrain what they saw as his excesses. As chairman of the RCC, Gaddafi was officially entitled the Revolutionary Chairman of the Libyan Arab Republic.

The 1969 Constitutional Proclamation granted the RCC powers to declare war, conclude and ratify treaties, appoint diplomatic envoys, receive diplomatic missions, proclaim martial law, control the Libyan Armed Forces and appoint a Council of Ministers. By 1975, Gaddafi became the only member of the RCC to initiate major political programs or policies.

Gaddafi remained the public face of the government, with the identities of the other RCC members only being publicly revealed in the Official Gazette on 10 January 1970. All of them were young men, from (typically rural) working and middle-class backgrounds, and none had university degrees; in this way they were all distinct from the wealthy, highly educated conservatives who had previously governed the country. The coup completed, the RCC proceeded with their intentions of consolidating the revolutionary government and modernizing the country.

Monarchists and members of Idris' Senussi clan were removed from Libya's political world and armed forces; Gaddafi believed that this elite were opposed to the will of the Libyan people and needed to be expunged. Many figures in the old regime were imprisoned, though none were executed. They maintained the previous administration's ban on political parties, and ruled by decree. Further restrictions were placed on the press, and in May 1970, trade unions were banned as part of the RCC's policy idea to replace them with people’s committees. However, they were later reinstated as part of the 1975 institutional changes, requiring workers to join industry appropriate unions.

In June 1971, Gaddafi declared the formation of the Arab Socialist Union as the sole legal party of Libya. Gaddafi announced that it would bring true democracy with all participating, eliminate class distinctions and form a new socialist ideology based on Islam, rejecting Marxism.

During a speech in Zuwarah on 15 April 1973, Gaddafi declared the Cultural Revolution which laid down five principles for the continuation of the revolution in Libya. This happened after increasing tensions between Gaddafi and his colleagues in the RCC had led him to agree to step down. Gaddafi had told the RCC that he would announce his resignation to the people at the Zuwarah speech, but he instead surprised them with his declaration of the Cultural Revolution. This made Gaddafi the uncontested leader of Libya.

=== Dissolvement ===
In November 1976, Gaddafi hoped to begin the transition into a fully people-powered government. He pushed a draft resolution into the Basic People’s Committees which had the aim of abolishing the RCC. However, Gaddafi received pushback from the General People’s Congress, as they sought to delay the decision, feeling that the revolution needed a strong figurehead, and removing Gaddafi from power would eliminate that. After learning of this, Gaddafi threatened to resign from his positions, disavowing power once and for all. Eventually, Gaddafi gave in and accepted the position as General Secretary of the General People’s Congress, while the other heads of the RCC took positions as the General Secretariat.

After Libya was converted into the "(Great) Socialist People's Libyan Arab Jamahiriya" in 1977, the remaining members of the RCC formed the apex of the "revolutionary sector" that oversaw the government. They were not subject to election, since they held office by virtue of having led the 1969 coup—officially described as "the Revolution." As a result, although Gaddafi held no formal governmental post after 1979, he continued to have the most important role in the government of the country until his overthrow and killing in the First Libyan Civil War in 2011.

== Membership ==
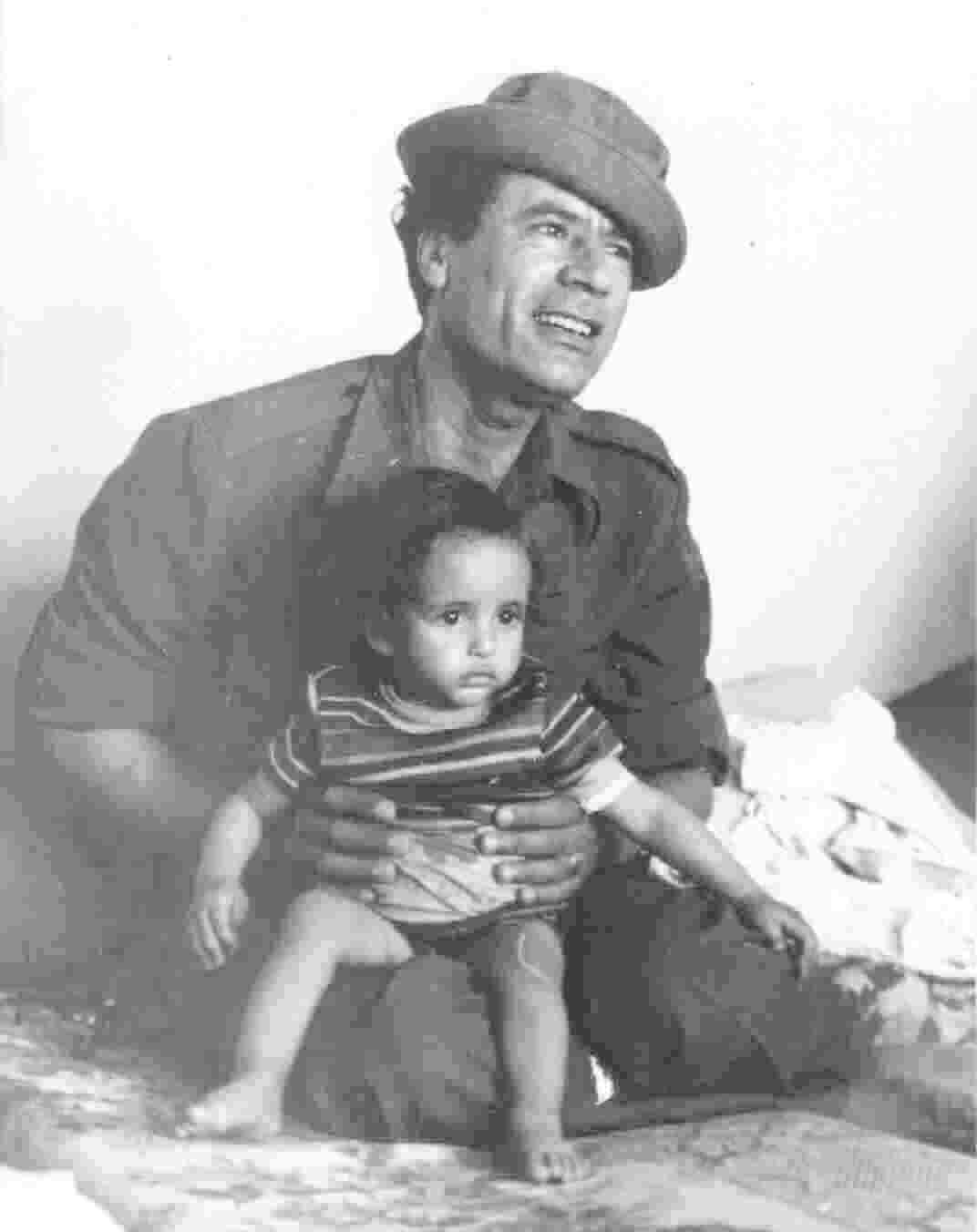
Gaddafi in 1976

The initial members (1970) were as follows:

- Col. Muammar Gaddafi (Revolutionary Chairman)
- Maj. Abdessalam Jallud (Vice-Chairman, Chief Executive Officer)
- Maj. Beshir al-Saghir Hawady (until 1975)
- Maj. Mukthar Abdullah al-Gherwy (resigned in 1972)
- Capt. Abdul Moniem al-Taher el-Huny (until 1975)
- Capt. Mustafa al-Kharouby
- Maj. Khuwaildi al-Hamidi
- Maj. Muhammad Nejm (resigned in 1973)
- Maj. Awad Ali Hamza (until 1975)
- Maj. Abu-Bakr Yunis Jabr
- Capt. Umar Muhayshi (until 1975)
- Capt. Mohammed Abu Bakr Al-Magariaf (died in a car accident in August 1972)

== See also ==
- History of Libya under Muammar Gaddafi
- Libyan Arab Jamahiriya

== Sources ==
- Libya - Constitution (Adopted on: 11 Dec 1969)
- Libya - Declaration on the Establishment of the Authority of the People (Adopted on: 2 March 1977)
- The Revolutionary Command Council (RCC)
