= Arab Socialist Union (Libya) =

Libyan Arab Socialist Union الإتحاد الإشتراكي العربي الليبي
- Chairman: Muammar Gaddafi
- General Secretary: Bashir Saghir Hawadi
- Founded: 11 June 1971; 55 years ago
- Dissolved: 3 March 1977; 49 years ago
- Headquarters: Tripoli
- Ideology: Nasserism; Arab socialism
- Regional affiliation: PSOM (historical)
- Egyptian counterpart: Arab Socialist Union

Party flag

The Libyan Arab Socialist Union (Arabic: الإتحاد الإشتراكي العربي الليبي) was a Libyan political party from 1971 to 1977 based on the principles of Nasserist Arab socialism. Muammar Gaddafi served as chairman of the party.

== History ==
On 11 June 1971, Gaddafi declared the formation of the Arab Socialist Union (ASU) as the sole legal party of Libya. Gaddafi announced that it would bring about universal democracy, eliminate class distinctions and form a new socialist ideology based on Islam, rejecting Marxism.

Many aspects of Gaddafi's Libyan Arab nationalist, republican, and Arab socialist revolution were based on the principles of Egyptian President Gamal Abdel Nasser. Like Nasser, Gaddafi seized power through a Free Officers Movement, which would later become the Revolutionary Command Council. Like its Egyptian counterpart, the Libyan ASU was the sole legal party and was designed to serve as a vehicle for integrated national expression rather than as a political party. The party was open to all Arabs. However, only a few non-Libyans joined.

Bashir Hawady was the general secretary of the party. In May 1972, the Libyan ASU and the Egyptian ASU agreed to merge their two parties into a single body. The Arab Socialist Union was closely controlled by the RCC, which had the power to annul any resolution or dissolve any branch. Trade unions were incorporated into the ASU.

The first ASU congress took place in March 1972 with a membership of 322,000, where Gaddafi made a five-hour speech and then debated other RCC members over the freedom of press and the right to strike. At the second ASU national congress in November 1974, the administrative system of governorates and directorates was abolished to create direct contact between the government and the people, and committees were placed under direct supervision of the Arab Socialist Union.

In April 1975, the Arab Socialist Union Congress was replaced by the 618-member General People's Congress. It met in November 1975 and then in January 1976 to approve the budget and demand that any opposition to Gaddafi's rule be crushed. The Arab Socialist Union was abolished during the Sabha Congress on 3 March 1977.

== See also ==
- Arab Socialist Union (Egypt)
- Arab Socialist Union (Iraq)
- Arab Socialist Union Party (Syria)
