= Bashir Saghir Hawadi =

Libyan general (born 1941)

- Born: 1941 (age 84–85); Italian Libya

Bashir Saghir Hawadi (Arabic: بشير الصغير هوادي; born 1941) is a Libyan major general who served under Muammar Gaddafi. He was among the twelve original members of the Libyan Revolutionary Command Council, and became the chief judge of the Libyan People's Court, and the General Secretary of the Arab Socialist Union.

== Biography ==
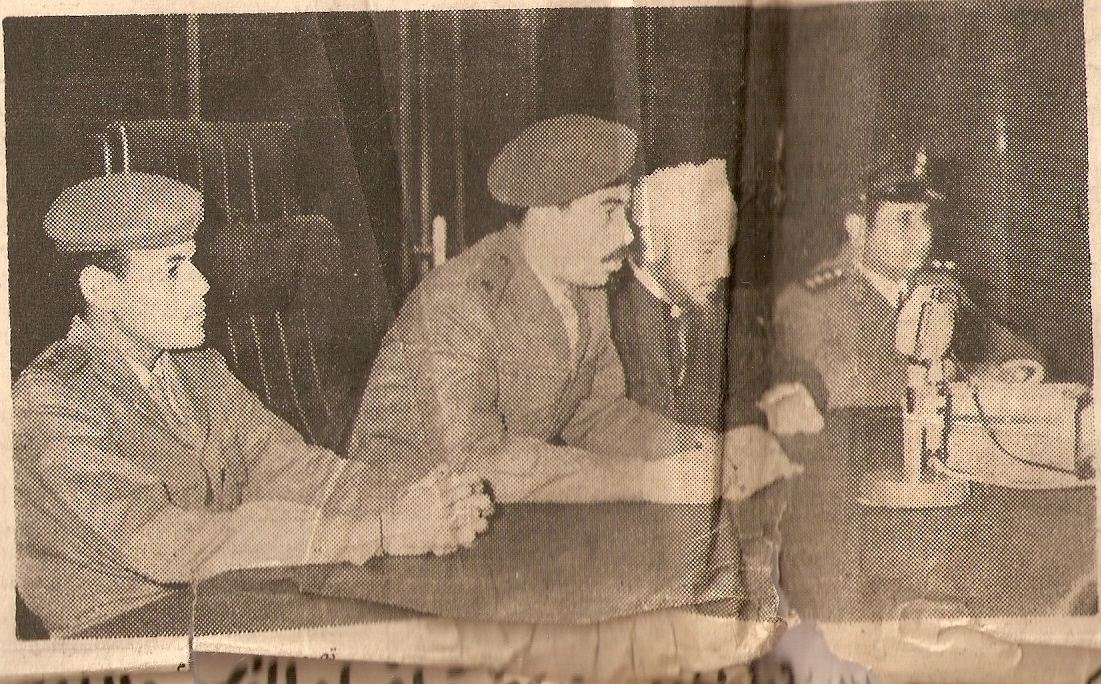
Hawadi (second from left) serving as chief judge at the Libyan People's Court in 1970

=== Early life and education ===
A native of Waddan, Hawadi was a classmate of Muammar Gaddafi at the Benghazi Military University Academy. He and Awad Ali Hamza (born 1943) were in the political study cell Gaddafi formed at the school.

=== Career under Gaddafi ===
After the successful coup, he was among the twelve "free officers" named to the Libyan Revolutionary Command Council (RCC). He also served as chief judge of the Libyan People's Court in 1970.

In June 1971, Gaddafi founded a vanguard party named the Arab Socialist Union to mobilize revolutionary enthusiasm and support of the masses. Hawadi was named General Secretary of the party, while Gaddafi was chairman. He later served as Minister of Religious Affairs. In that capacity, Hawadi opposed funding for the Nation of Islam by arguing that the NOI was not a real Muslim organization. Herbert Muhammad, the son of NOI leader Elijah Muhammad, had visited Gaddafi in Tripoli in December 1971 and requested funding.

=== 1975 coup ===
In August 1975, Hawadi and Hamza sided with Planning Minister and fellow RCC member Umar Muhayshi in the latter's dispute with Gaddafi. Gaddafi accused them of plotting a coup. Hawadi and Hamza were arrested; Muhayshi and Abdul Moniem al-Taher el-Huny fled Libya. The aborted coup hastened the end of the RCC. In the ensuing purge, most of the conspirators were executed in March 1976. Hawadi apparently survived the purge. It was unclear how long Hawadi was imprisoned, but it appeared he was eventually forgiven by Gaddafi and led a quiet life out of politics.

=== Libyan Civil War ===
When the First Libyan Civil War broke out in 2011, Hawadi was summoned by Gaddafi and he appeared on Libyan state TV for the first time in 38 years to praise Gaddafi. In September 2011, after the Battle of Tripoli, Hawadi was arrested by rebel forces and imprisoned in Misrata. Hawadi claimed Gaddafi had threatened to kill him and wipe his hometown of Waddan off the map if he had refused to help Gaddafi mobilize public support and "calm the people of Libya." Hawadi also claimed that he had had no military or political role in a long time due to his poor relationship with Gaddafi and that he had surrendered to the National Transitional Council after being guaranteed safety. He stated that he knew nothing about Gaddafi's whereabouts as he had last seen him on 25 May 2011.
