= Abu-Bakr Yunis Jabr =

Libyan military officer and politician (1940-2011)

Lieutenant General Abu-Bakr Yunis Jabr
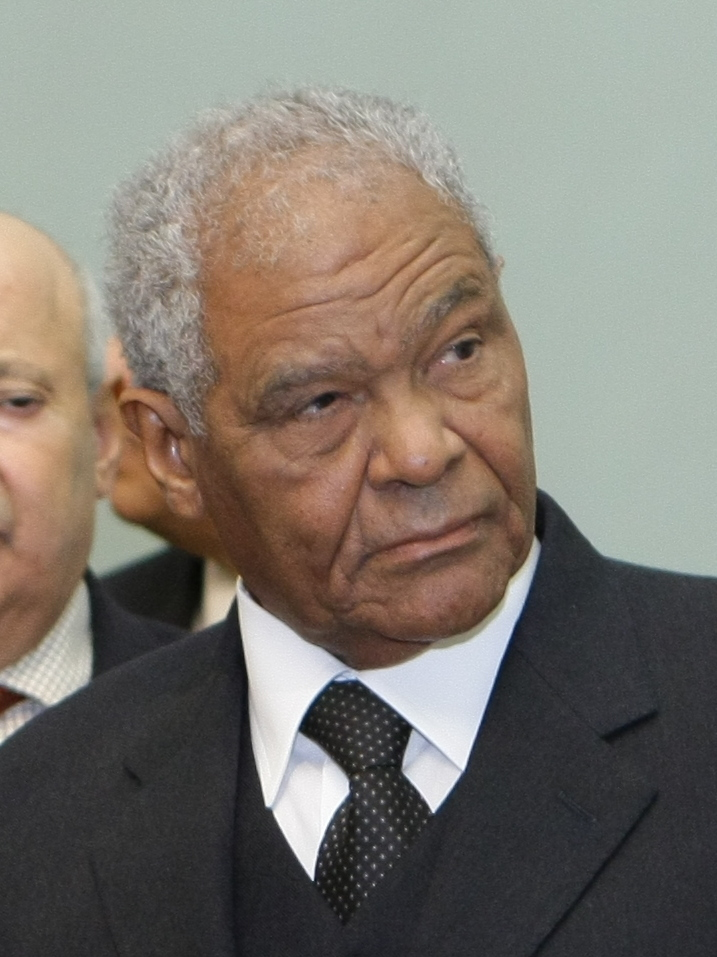
- Jabr in 2010

Secretary of the Libyan General Committee for Defence
- In office 16 January 1970 – 20 October 2011
- Prime Minister: See list: Muammar Gaddafi; Abdessalam Jalloud; Abdul Ati al-Obeidi; Jadallah Azzuz at-Talhi; Muhammad az-Zaruq Rajab; Jadallah Azzuz at-Talhi; Umar Mustafa al-Muntasir; Abuzed Omar Dorda; Abdul Majid al-Qa'ud; Muhammad Ahmad al-Mangoush; Imbarek Shamekh; Shukri Ghanem; Baghdadi Mahmudi
- Leader: Muammar Gaddafi
- Preceded by: Adam al-Hawaz
- Succeeded by: Osama al-Juwaili

Personal details
- Born: c. 1940 Jalu, Italian Libya
- Died: October 20, 2011 (aged 70–71) Sirte, Libya
- Cause of death: Assassination
- Resting place: Libyan Desert

Military service
- Allegiance: Libya
- Branch/service: Libyan Army
- Years of service: 1965 — 2011
- Rank: Colonel General
- Commands: Secretary of the Libyan General Committee for Defence; Deputy Commander-in-Chief of the Libyan Armed Forces

Abu-Bakr Yunis Jabr (Arabic: أبو بكر يونس جابر, 1940 – 20 October 2011) was a Libyan military officer and politician who was the Minister of Defence of Libya during the rule of Muammar Gaddafi. His official position was Secretary of the Libyan General Committee for Defence.

== Early life and education ==
There is disagreement about the year of Jabr's birth. According to the UN, he was born in 1952 in Jalu, Libya. The German newspaper the Frankfurter Allgemeine Zeitung gives the much earlier date of 1940. Educated at the Military Academy in Benghazi, Jabr was classmates with Muammar Gaddafi.

== Career ==
Later Gaddafi and Jabr became members of the Free Officers Movement which on 1 September 1969 removed King Idris from power in a bloodless coup and brought Gaddafi to power. Following an attempted coup in December led by minister Adam al-Hawaz, Gaddafi appointed Jabr as the new defense minister. Jabr was the head of the Libyan Army from the 1970s and was one of the original members of the 12 army officials of the Revolutionary Command Council led by Gaddafi. He, Gaddafi and the other surviving members of the Revolutionary Command Council sat atop the "revolutionary sector" which oversaw the government. The leaders of the revolutionary sector were not subject to election, since they owed their offices to their roles in the 1969 coup, officially described during Gaddafi's time as "the revolution."

== Libyan Civil War ==
Jabr was reported to be under arrest and in prison in 2011 for not obeying orders to kill protesters. It was reported on 7 June 2011 that Jabr was executed by the government for refusing to carry out orders to kill protesters. On 13 June, Libyan state television showed footage of him for the first time, in what they claim was him greeting soldiers at the frontline in the oil town of Brega. On 2 August, The Washington Post wrote that Gaddafi's defense minister, Jabr, had announced on Libyan state television that members of the army who defected to join the rebels and returned to the government would be protected by a general pardon.

== Assassination ==
Jabr died in the Battle of Sirte. On 20 October 2011, Al Jazeera reported that Jabr was killed in Sirte. He was in a car convoy with Gaddafi trying to flee the Siege of Sirte. After the convoy was attacked by NATO aircraft he sought shelter from shrapnel in drain pipes with Gaddafi. NTC fighters captured him and Gaddafi. Yunis Jabr was with a group of Gaddafi loyalists, when a guard saw a group of rebels approaching them, off in the distance. The guard attempted to throw a grenade at the rebels. However, the grenade bounced off a concrete wall, and landed back in front of the loyalist group. The guard then attempted to pick the grenade up, but when he did so, it exploded. The detonation killed the guard and, according to witnesses, fatally injured Abu-Bakr Yunis Jabr. He reportedly died on his way to a hospital. Al Jazeera also aired footage of his body being driven away in an ambulance.

== See also ==
- General People's Committee of Libya
