= Umar Muhayshi =

Libyan politician (1941-1984)

Personal details
- Born: 1941 Misrata, Italian Libya
- Died: c. January 1984
- Cause of death: Blunt trauma
- Party: Libyan Revolutionary Command Council
- Education: Benghazi Military University Academy

Umar Abdullah el-Muhayshi (Note: Adyghe: Умар-Абдилахь, romanized: Wumar-Abdilah, also transliterated as Omar al-Meheshi) (1941 – January 1984) was a Libyan army officer and a member of the Libyan Revolutionary Command Council (RCC) that ruled Libya after the 1969 Libyan coup d'état.

After he and Libyan leader Muammar Gaddafi disagreed on how to use Libya's resources, other RCC members sided with him. Muhayshi subsequently fled to Tunis. He died shortly after being extradited from Morocco.

== Life ==
Born in 1941 to a family of Circassian origin, Umar Muhayshi was said to be a childhood friend of Muammar Gaddafi and later a member of the group of army officers called the Free Officers Movement that ousted the royal regime in Libya on 1 September 1969. He was one of the twelve members of the RCC, headed by Muammar Gaddafi. He was promoted to the rank of Major after the revolution. He was Minister of Treasury in 1970. He was later appointed Minister of Planning and took issue with Gaddafi's use of Libyan resources to further pan-Arab and anti-colonialist causes. Instead, he wanted Libya to invest its oil revenues in agriculture and industry, particularly heavy industries, such as iron and steel, in his hometown Misrata.

In August 1975, fellow RCC members Bashir Saghir Hawadi and Awad Hamza sided with Muhayshi in his dispute with Gaddafi, who accused them of plotting a coup. Hawadi and Hamza were arrested; Muhayshi and Abdul Moniem al-Taher el-Huny fled Libya. By that time Muhayshi had already fled to Tunis. Most of the other supposed conspirators were executed in March 1976. In an interview with Al-Ahram, Muhayshi denied attempting a coup and stated that he had merely tried to "correct Gaddafi's error" and had asked Gaddafi to resign. In the same interview, Muhayshi referred to Gaddafi as a "dangerous psychopath."

According to declassified diplomatic telegram sent from the US Embassy in Egypt to the State Department, Egyptian President Anwar Sadat was using Muhayshi's radio broadcast to discredit Gaddafi and most of Gaddafi's RCC (with the exception of Abdessalam Jalloud) had turned against him by 1976. In light of this development, Sadat's government considered several options: forming a Libyan government-in-exile headed by Muhayshi, using Saudi money to fund anti-Gaddafi dissidents inside Libya, or creating a Muhayshi-led government on Libyan territory (near the Egypt–Libya border), where Muhayshi could then appeal for an Egyptian "intervention" to remove Gaddafi by force either through arrest or assassination.

Gaddafi allegedly offered ex-CIA officers Edwin P. Wilson and Frank Terpil $1 million in 1976 to recruit a group of Cuban exiles involved in the Bay of Pigs Invasion to assassinate Muhayshi. The Cuban exiles initially thought the target of the assassination would be Carlos the Jackal, then living in Libya under Gaddafi's protection, and they refused to partake in the plot when the target turned out to be Muhayshi. Wilson was sentenced to 32 years in prison over his ties to Gaddafi, but was acquitted in 1983 on the counts of murder conspiracy and conspiracy to solicit murder in the Muhayshi case. Terpil never stood trial as he remained a fugitive for the rest of his life.

In 1983, while Muhayshi was in Morocco, then ruled by King Hassan II, the Moroccan authorities delivered Muhayshi to Gaddafi in exchange for Gaddafi promising to cut off financial aid to the Polisario Front. Muhayshi was murdered in 1984; according to Libya: Qadhafi's Revolution and the Modern State by Lillian Harris, he was allegedly stomped to death on the airport runway as soon as he landed in Tripoli, with Gaddafi watching.

== See also ==
- History of Libya under Muammar Gaddafi
