= Abdel Moneim al-Houni =

Libyan military officer and politician

Abdel Moniem al-Taher al-Houni (Arabic: عبد المنعم الطاهر الهوني), also transliterated as Abdul Munim el-Huni, is a Libyan military officer, diplomat, and politician. He was one of the original twelve members of the Libyan Revolutionary Command Council and briefly served as Minister of Foreign Affairs from 1974 to 1975.

== Biography ==
=== Early career ===
Houni was a major and among the Free Officers involved in the 1969 Libyan coup d'état that overthrew King Idris and brought Muammar Gaddafi to power. After the successful coup, he was among the twelve men named to the Libyan Revolutionary Command Council (RCC). In July 1972, amid false rumors that Gaddafi had been ousted or jailed by other members of the RCC, Houni was named Interior Minister in a new 18-man cabinet. He and Prime Minister Abdessalam Jalloud were the only military figures in the new cabinet; the rest were all civilian technocrats. He later served as Foreign Minister from 1974 to 1975. He also served as head of General Intelligence.

=== 1975 coup attempt and anti-Gaddafi activities from abroad ===
In 1975, Houni was involved in Umar Muhayshi's failed coup attempt against Gaddafi. After the coup was foiled, Houni fled to Egypt, where he was given asylum by Egyptian President Anwar Sadat. While living in exile in Cairo, Houni was involved in anti-Gaddafi activities. According to declassified State Department telegram from August 1976, Egypt and Saudi Arabia considered Houni a potential alternative to Gaddafi, either as the leader of an anti-Gaddafi government-in-exile or the leader of Libya if Egypt could remove Gaddafi in a military coup or assassination.

During the 1986 United States bombing of Libya, Houni, still living in Egypt, was named as the "convener of the Libyan National Salvation Committee." In January 1987, a wide range of anti-Gaddafi Libyans in exile, including Ba'athists, socialists, monarchists, liberals, and Islamic fundamentalists, agreed to coordinate under the leadership of Houni. At the time, Houni was thought of as the most likely candidate to lead Libya if Gaddafi were toppled and someone broadly acceptable to all factions of the anti-Gaddafi opposition. The Libyan National Salvation Committee was later renamed National Alliance, but broke apart in January 1988 due to internal disagreements. In May 1992, Houni was cited as the founder of the National Libyan Alliance. He also reportedly coordinated with Khalifa Haftar in the 1990s.

In October 1992, Houni reportedly attended an anti-Gaddafi meeting in Algeria with another former foreign minister Mansour Rashid El-Kikhia, the leader of the Libyan National Alliance. He and Kikhia also attended a seminar in Washington in late 1993. On 10 December 1993, Kikhia disappeared in Cairo and was widely believed to have been abducted (his body was not found until 2012 in a refrigerator that belonged to Gaddafi's intelligence chief Abdullah Senussi). Days after Kikhia's disappearance, Gaddafi attended a political meeting that called for the killing of Houni, who was described by the Libyan press as a "traitor, spy, and stray dog."

=== Reconciliation with Gaddafi ===
Houni apparently reconciled with Gaddafi sometime in the early 2000s due to the intervention of Egypt and was appointed by Gaddafi as Libya's representative to the Arab League, but he continued to live in Egypt as the Arab League was headquartered in Cairo and thus his new job did not necessitate him to move back to Libya. In April 2003, Houni announced Libya's request to withdraw from the Arab League due to "the absence of a firm Arab stance" against the US invasion of Iraq. In 2006, Houni returned to Libya for the first time since 1975 as part of Saif al-Islam Gaddafi's national reconciliation campaign. In July 2007, Houni demanded other Arab countries cut diplomatic and economic ties with Bulgaria in the aftermath of the HIV trial in Libya.

=== Libyan Civil War ===
Following the outbreak of the Libyan civil war, Houni was among the first diplomats to defect from the Gaddafi regime to the National Transitional Council (NTC) and announced his resignation as Libya's representative to the Arab League "in solidarity with the revolution of the people and in protest of Gaddafi's actions." Houni falsely claimed that the Gaddafi regime was in its final hours and controlled only Bab al-Azizia and three other military camps. The Fall of Tripoli would not occur until six months later.

Houni accused Moussa Koussa, who had defected from Gaddafi, of being responsible for the assassinations of many Libyan opposition figures abroad. He also claimed Koussa had been one of the pillars of the Gaddafi regime since the 1970s.

In June 2011, Houni was named the NTC's representative to Egypt and the Arab League. He was involved in behind-the-scenes talks with Gaddafi's envoys to negotiate a dignified exit for Gaddafi. Houni and other surviving members of the historical Libyan Revolutionary Command Council were floated as potential transitional figures.

During the Battle of Tripoli, Houni speculated on Gaddafi's whereabouts. He stated that after losing Tripoli, Gaddafi had only three choices: his hometown Sirte, the desert Jufra District, or the oasis town of Traghan near the border with Niger.

Following the fall of the Gaddafi regime, the NTC was recognized by the Arab League as the legitimate government of Libya and Houni was once again allowed to serve as Libya's representative to the Arab League.
