= Abdessalam Jalloud =

Libyan politician and military officer (born 1944)

- عبد السلام جلود
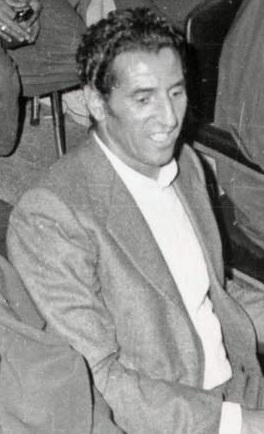
- Jalloud in 1979

Prime Minister of Libya
- In office 16 July 1972 – 2 March 1977
- Leader: Muammar Gaddafi
- Preceded by: Muammar Gaddafi
- Succeeded by: Abdul Ati al-Obeidi

Minister of Treasury
- In office 1970–1972
- Prime Minister: Muammar Gaddafi
- Preceded by: Umar Muhayshi
- Succeeded by: Muhammad az-Zaruq Rajab

Personal details
- Born: 15 December 1944 (age 81) Mizda, British Military Administration of Tripolitania

Military service
- Allegiance: Libyan Arab Jamahiriya; Libya
- Branch/service: Libyan Army
- Rank: Major
- Commands: Deputy Chairman of the Libyan Revolutionary Command Council

Abdessalam Jalloud (Arabic: عبد السلام جلود, romanized: ‘Abd al-Salām Jallūd; born 15 December 1944) is a Libyan former politician and military officer who served as the prime minister of Libya from 16 July 1972 to 2 March 1977, under the government of Muammar Gaddafi. He was also Minister of Treasury from 1970 until 1972.

== Early life and career ==
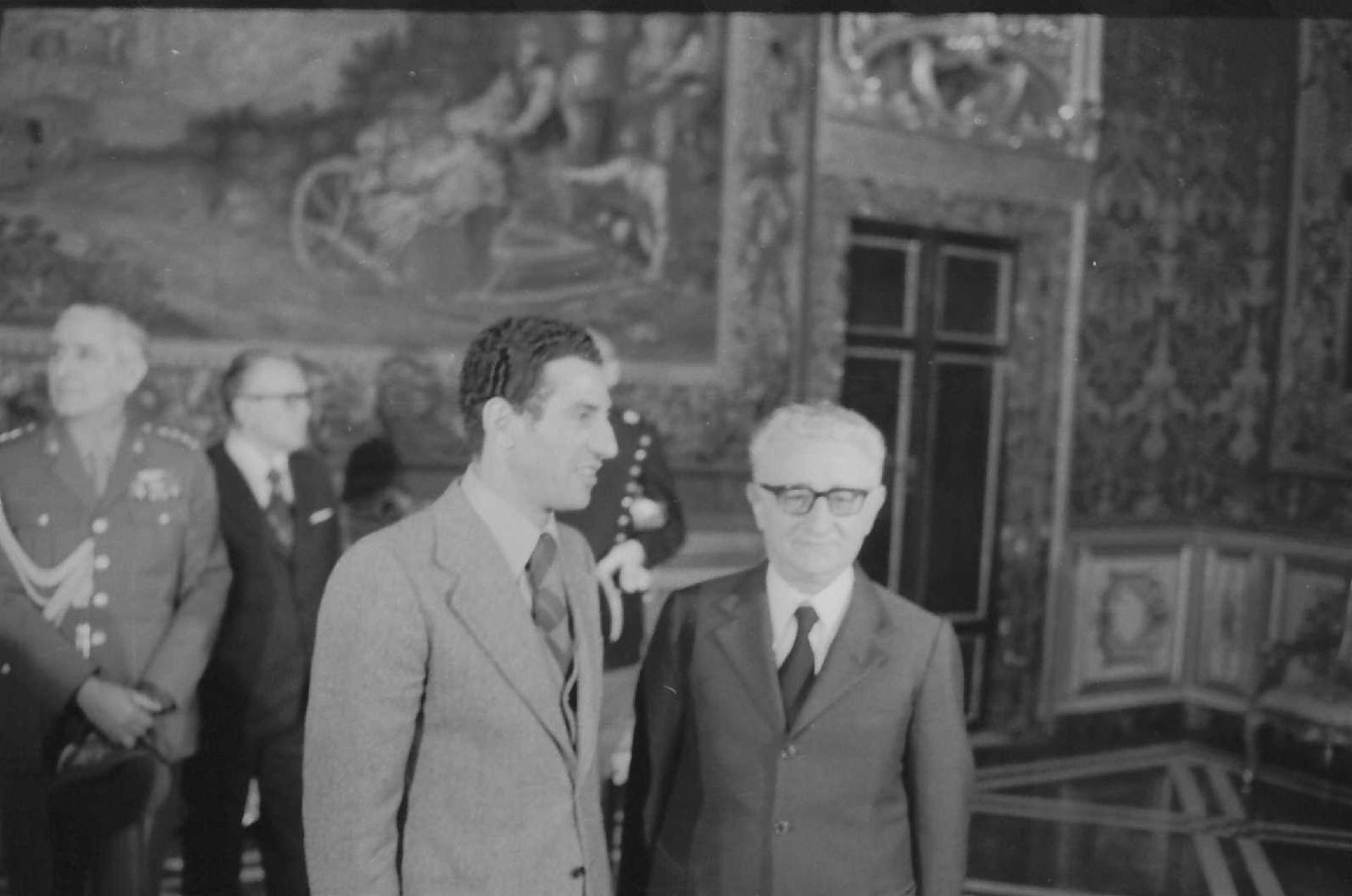
Prime Minister Jalloud on a visit to Rome on 22 February 1974

Jalloud was a classmate of Gaddafi. Major Abdessalam Jalloud entered the military academy of Benghazi where they formed the hard core of the "free officers" who staged a military coup in September 1969, launching the Libyan revolution. Jalloud became Gaddafi's adviser and deputy chairman of the Libyan Revolutionary Command Council (RCC).

== Treasury Minister ==
He was entrusted with the supervision of the oil sector, which represented 96% of the country's revenue. In September 1970, Jalloud succeeded in imposing a rise in oil prices to all companies operating in Libya, opening the way for the other oil producers and for the subsequent rises of the 1970s. The same year, Jalloud also succeeded in negotiating for the evacuation of American and British military bases from Libya. During the negotiations for the evacuation of the American Air Force base at Wheelus, on the outskirts of Tripoli, the then 25-year-old Jalloud, dressed in military regalia, was advised by the American diplomatic envoy leading the U.S. delegation that he could not negotiate, "under the gun", nor, in the clamorous atmosphere of the hundreds of Libyan protesters who had gathered outside the venue, loudly refusing to depart the scene prior to an evacuation date being set. Jalloud exited the room and removed his pistol, returning to state, "As for the demonstrators, you take your orders from the U.S. Government while I take mine from those voices outside." American troops were subsequently evacuated and Wheelus was handed over to the Libyans, on 11 June 1970.

In March 1970, six months after the Libyan revolution, Jalloud went to Beijing to build bilateral ties and evaluate areas of potential scientific cooperation between Libya and the People's Republic of China. As part of the Libyan state's efforts to evaluate solutions to what was then a foreseeable water crisis in the North African country, Jalloud solicited Chinese assistance for a peaceful nuclear energy program, aimed mainly at expanding Libya's desalination industry. In 2011, Jalloud denied attempting to buy nuclear weapons from China.

== Premier (1972–1977) ==
On August 21, 1972, Jalloud and fellow Revolutionary Command Council member Mohammed Abu Bakr Al-Magariaf were involved in a car accident in Al-Khums. Magariaf was killed in the accident; Jalloud recovered after being hospitalized briefly.

In a 1980 interview with an Italian newspaper, Jalloud attempted to justify Gaddafi's "stray dogs" policy of assassinating Libyan dissidents abroad by saying, "Many people who fled abroad took with them goods belonging to the Libyan people. Now they are putting their illicit gains at the disposal of the opposition led by Sadat, world imperialism and Israel." In 1986, Jalloud claimed that the "stray dogs" policy had ended because "they were all dead."

Jalloud (from the Magarha tribe) was the second most powerful man in Libya for over two decades. He played a key role in preventing the handover of Pan Am Flight 103 suspect Abdelbaset al-Megrahi because Megrahi was also from his tribe. Jalloud, Gaddafi and the other surviving members of the RCC sat atop the "revolutionary sector" which oversaw the government. The leaders of the revolutionary sector were not subject to election, since they owed their offices to their roles in the 1969 coup, officially described during Gaddafi's time as "the revolution." In 1986, Jalloud was implicated in the murder of Hassan Ishkal, an influential aide and distant cousin of Gaddafi. Ishkal had disagreed with the radical economic policies Jalloud was implementing. At the time of his death, Ishkal was considered the third most powerful man in Libya after only Gaddafi and Jalloud.

== Post-premiership ==
After several disagreements with Libyan leader Muammar Gaddafi (from the Qadhadhfa tribe), Jalloud resigned in 1977, departing the Libyan political scene, and was replaced by Captain Mohammad Emsied al-Majdoub al-Gaddafi as the general coordinator of the Revolutionary Committees. The London-based newspaper Al Hayat reported in April 1995 that the authorities had confiscated Jalloud's passport and kept him under surveillance because of growing disagreement between him and Gaddafi. This disagreement was shown in public after the visit of a delegation of 192 Libyan pilgrims to Israel in May 1993.

In October 2010. media affiliated with Gaddafi's reformist son Saif al-Islam mentioned Jalloud as a potential candidate for prime minister to fight corruption.

== Libyan Civil War and Lebanese arrest warrant ==
On 19 August 2011, during the Libyan Civil War, it was reported that Jalloud had defected to the rebel forces opposing Gaddafi and was on his way from Zintan to the Tunisian island of Djerba from where he departed to Italy. On 21 August 2011, Jalloud was interviewed by Al-Jazeera from his exile in Italy, where he called Gaddafi a "tyrant" and "false prophet" and called on Libyans to defect from the Gaddafi regime before it was too late. He also claimed that he had tried to leave Libya 18 times (six times by sea, twelve times by land) during the Libyan Civil War before he managed to flee and denied reports that his defection was assisted by foreign diplomats, foreign intelligence agents, or Italian oil company Eni. On 18 October 2011, two days before Gaddafi's killing, Jalloud gave an interview to Al-Hayat where he called Gaddafi's imminent death "the natural end of any tyrant."

In 2017 a Lebanese judge issued an arrest warrant for Jalloud regarding the disappearance of the Iranian Shiite Imam Musa Sadr, founder of the Lebanese Shiite Amal Movement, in Libya in 1978. Jalloud, who was in charge of Libya's Lebanon and Syria files at the time of Sadr's appearance, claimed he knew nothing about Sadr's fate and that Gaddafi refused to bring up the subject.

In 2021, Jalloud published his memoir through the Arab Center for Research and Policy Studies.
