= Kingdom of Libya =

Kingdom in North Africa from 1951 to 1969

United Kingdom of Libya (1951–1963) المملكة الليبية المتحدة (Arabic) Regno Unito di Libia (Italian) Kingdom of Libya (1963–1969) المملكة الليبية (Arabic) Regno di Libia (Italian)
- 1951–1969
- Flag Coat of arms
- Anthem: "Libya, Libya, Libya"
- Capital: Tripoli; Benghazi; Bayda (Note: Tripoli and Benghazi (1951–1963) Bayda (1963–1969))
- Common languages: Arabic; Tamazight; Italian
- Religion: Islam
- Government: Federal parliamentary constitutional monarchy (1951–1963) Unitary parliamentary constitutional monarchy (1963–1969)
- Monarch
  - 1951–1969: Idris I
- Crown Prince Regent
  - 1962: Hasan
- Prime Minister
  - 1951–1954 (first): Mahmud al-Muntasir
  - 1968–1969 (last): Wanis al-Qaddafi
- Legislature: Parliament
  - Upper house: Senate
  - Lower house: House of Representatives
- History
  - Independence from the United Kingdom and France: 24 December 1951
  - Coup d'état: 1 September 1969
- Currency: Libyan pound
Preceded by
Emirate of Cyrenaica
British Military Administration
French Military Administration
Succeeded by
Libyan Arab Republic

The Kingdom of Libya (Arabic: المملكة الليبية, romanized: Al-Mamlakah Al-Lībiyya, lit. 'Libyan Kingdom'; Italian: Regno di Libia), known as the United Kingdom of Libya from 1951 to 1963, was a constitutional monarchy in North Africa.

The unified kingdom came into existence upon independence on 24 December 1951 from the United Kingdom and France and lasted until a bloodless coup d'état on 1 September 1969. The coup, led by Muammar Gaddafi, overthrew King Idris and established the Libyan Arab Republic.

== History ==
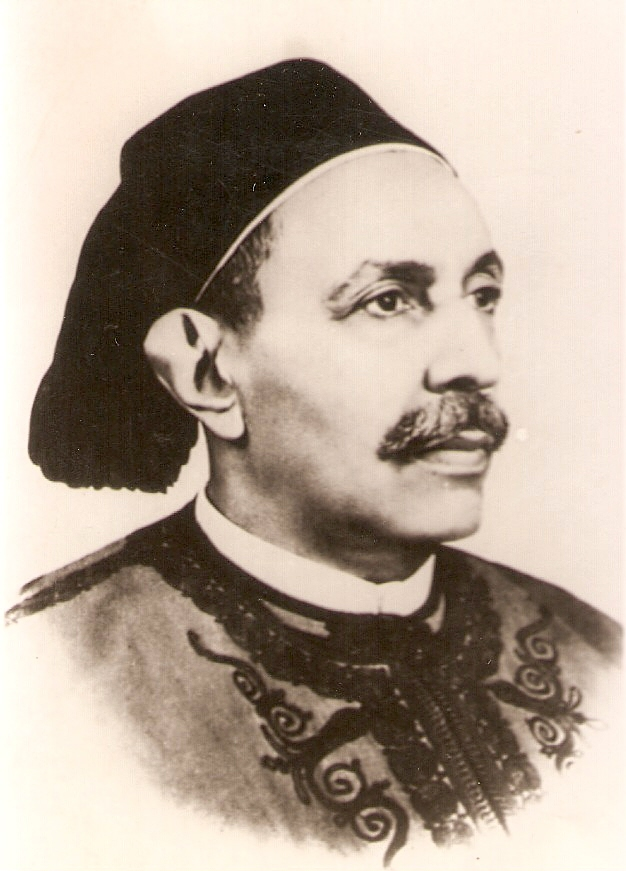
King Idris I of Libya

=== Constitution ===
Under the constitution of October 1951, the federal monarchy of Libya was headed by King Idris as chief of state, with succession to his designated male heirs (Art. 44 and 45 of the 1951 Constitution). Substantial political power resided with the king. The executive arm of the government consisted of a prime minister and Council of Ministers designated by the king but also responsible to the Chamber of Deputies, the lower house of a bicameral legislature. The Senate, or upper house, consisted of eight representatives from each of the three provinces. Half of the senators were nominated by the king, who also had the right to veto legislation and to dissolve the lower house. Local autonomy in the provinces was exercised through provincial governments and legislatures. Tripoli and Benghazi served alternately as the national capital.

The Constitution was drafted under the auspices of the United Nations, and was seen to include significant mechanisms for the protection of human rights. Ultimately, the document established an institutional apparatus that promoted transparency and safeguards against antidemocratic power accumulation. In particular, the Constitution envisioned mechanisms to guarantee accountability in the exercise of public functions and equality of all Libyan citizens before the law. At the time it was produced, it was received as a positive and forward-thinking model of good governance and balance of powers for the region.

=== Political development ===
Several factors, rooted in Libya's history, affected the political development of the newly independent country. They reflected the differing political orientations of the provinces and the ambiguities inherent in Libya's monarchy. First, after the first Libyan general election, 1952, which was held on 19 February, political parties were abolished. The National Congress Party, which had campaigned against a federal form of government, was defeated throughout the country. The party was outlawed, and Bashir Saadawi was deported. Second, provincial ties continued to be more important than national ones, and the federal and provincial governments were constantly in dispute over their respective spheres of authority. A third problem derived from the lack of a direct heir to the throne. To remedy this situation, Idris in 1953 designated his sixty-year-old brother to succeed him. When the original heir apparent died, the king appointed his nephew, Prince Hasan ar Rida, his successor.

When a group of young officers and soldiers in the Libyan Army seized power under the leadership of Muammar Gaddafi on 1 September 1969, the Crown Prince, who was then ruling the country on behalf of King Idris was imprisoned for two years and subsequently reduced to complete isolation during the following seven years under house arrest. Publicly humiliated by Gaddafi's circle, he suffered a stroke that led him to seek medical treatment in the UK in 1988. He then travelled to Europe with his second son, Prince Mohammed El Hassan El Rida El Senussi, and died in 1992 in London surrounded by his family. When, on 18 June 1992, the last will of the late Crown Prince was read at a press conference at the presence of the press and of his five children, Prince Mohammed was formally appointed as the legitimate heir to the throne of Libya.

=== Foreign policy ===
In its foreign policy, the Kingdom of Libya was recognized as belonging to the conservative traditionalist bloc in the League of Arab States, of which it became a member in 1953.

The government was in close alliance with the United States and United Kingdom; both countries maintained military base rights in Libya. The U.S. supported the United Nations resolution providing for Libyan independence in 1951 and raised the status of its office at Tripoli from a consulate general to a legation. Libya opened a legation at Washington, D.C. in 1954. Both countries subsequently raised their missions to the embassy level and exchanged ambassadors.

In 1953, Libya concluded a twenty-year treaty of friendship and alliance with the United Kingdom under which the latter received military bases in exchange for financial and military assistance. The next year, Libya and the United States signed an agreement under which the United States also obtained military base rights, subject to renewal in 1970, in return for economic aid to Libya. The most important of the United States installations in Libya was Wheelus Air Base, near Tripoli, considered a strategically valuable installation in the 1950s and early 1960s. Reservations set aside in the desert were used by British and American military aircraft based in Europe as practice firing ranges. Libya forged close ties with France, Italy, Greece, Turkey, and established full diplomatic relations with the Soviet Union in 1955, but declined a Soviet offer of economic aid.

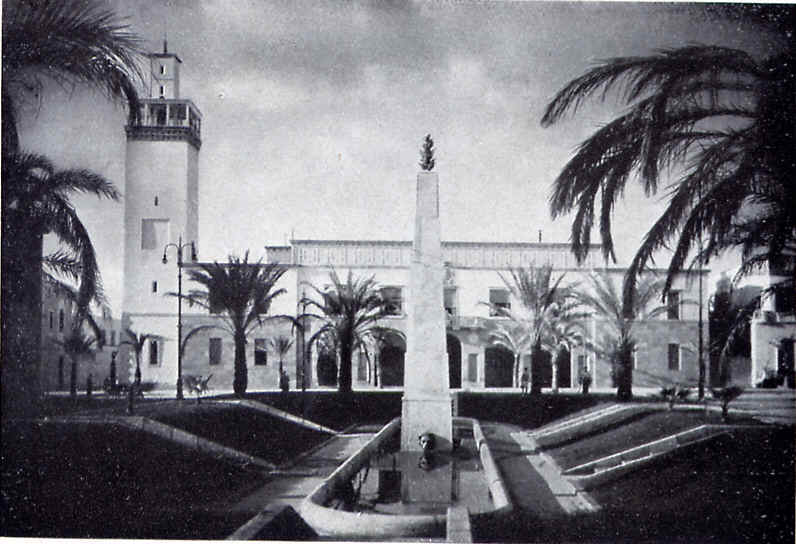
Al Manar Royal Palace in central Benghazi, the University of Libya's first campus, founded by royal decree in 1955.

As part of a broad assistance package, the UN Technical Assistance Board agreed to sponsor a technical aid program that emphasized the development of agriculture and education. The University of Libya was founded in 1955 by royal decree in Benghazi. Foreign powers, notably Britain and the United States, provided development aid. Steady economic improvement occurred, but the pace was slow, and Libya remained a poor and underdeveloped country heavily dependent on foreign aid.

=== Development of the nation ===
In 1956, Libya granted two American oil companies a concession of some 5,700,000 hectares (14,000,000 acres). This situation changed suddenly and dramatically in June 1959 when research prospectors from Esso (later renamed Exxon) confirmed the location of major petroleum deposits at Zaltan in Cyrenaica. Further discoveries followed, and commercial development was quickly initiated by concession holders who returned 50 percent of their profits to the Libyan government in taxes. In the petroleum market, Libya's advantages lay not only in the quantity but also in the high quality of its crude product. Libya's proximity and direct linkage to Europe by sea were further marketing advantages. The discovery and exploitation of petroleum turned the vast, sparsely populated, impoverished country into an independently wealthy nation with potential for extensive development and thus constituted a major turning point in Libyan history. Libya's petroleum law, initially passed in 1955, was amended in 1961 and again in 1965 to increase the Libyan government's share of the revenues from oil.

As development of petroleum resources progressed in the early 1960s, Libya launched its first Five-Year Plan, 1963–68. One negative result of the new wealth from petroleum, however, was a decline in agricultural production, largely through neglect. Internal Libyan politics continued to be stable, but the federal form of government had proven inefficient and cumbersome. In April 1963, Prime Minister Mohamed Othman Essed secured adoption by parliament of a bill, endorsed by the king, that abolished the federal form of government, establishing in its place a unitary, monarchical state with a dominant central government. By legislation, the historical divisions of Cyrenaica, Tripolitania, and Fezzan were to be eliminated and the country divided into ten new provinces, each headed by an appointed governor. The legislature revised the constitution in 1963 to reflect the change from a federal to a unitary state.

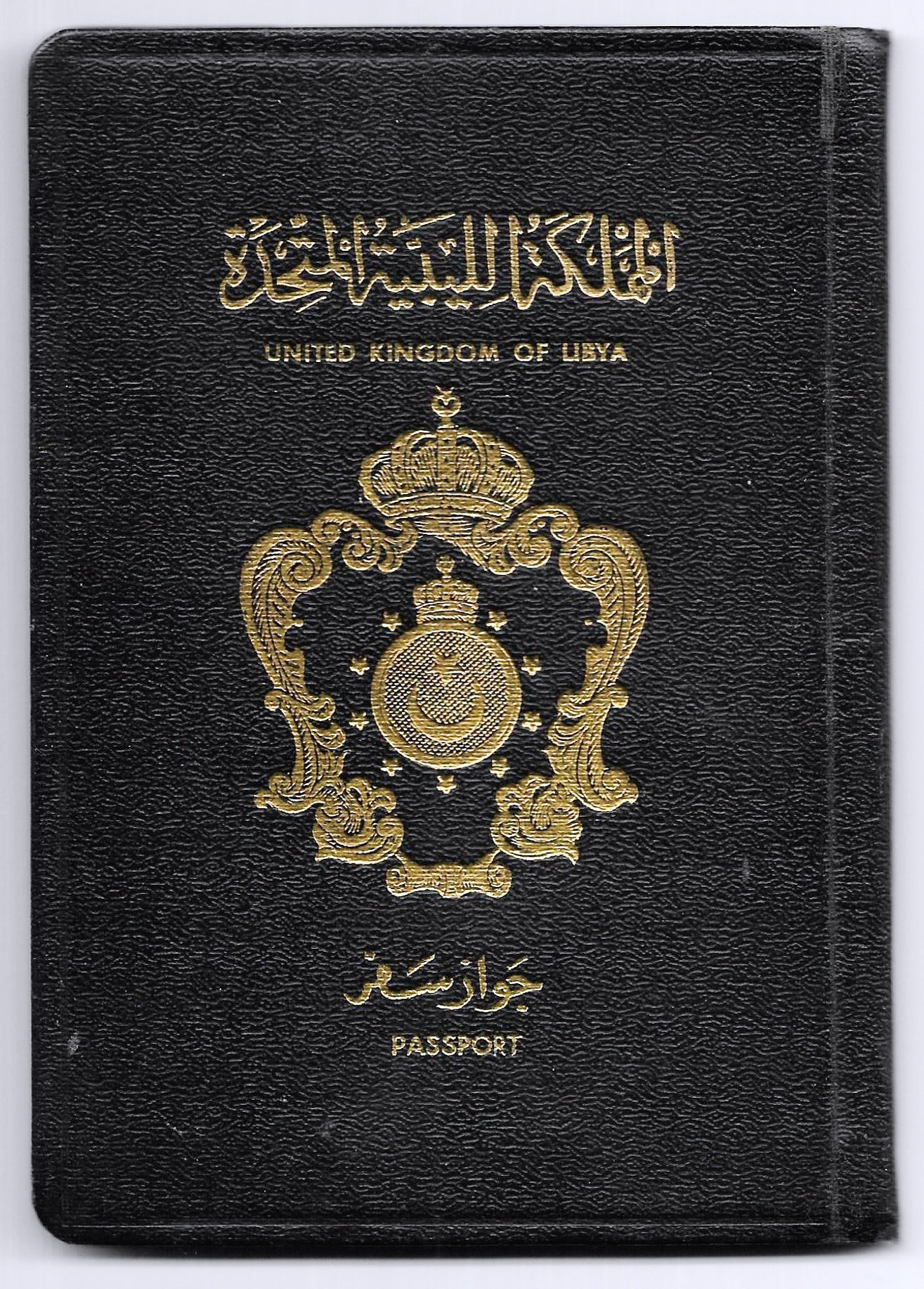
1959 United Kingdom of Libya passport cover.

=== International relations ===
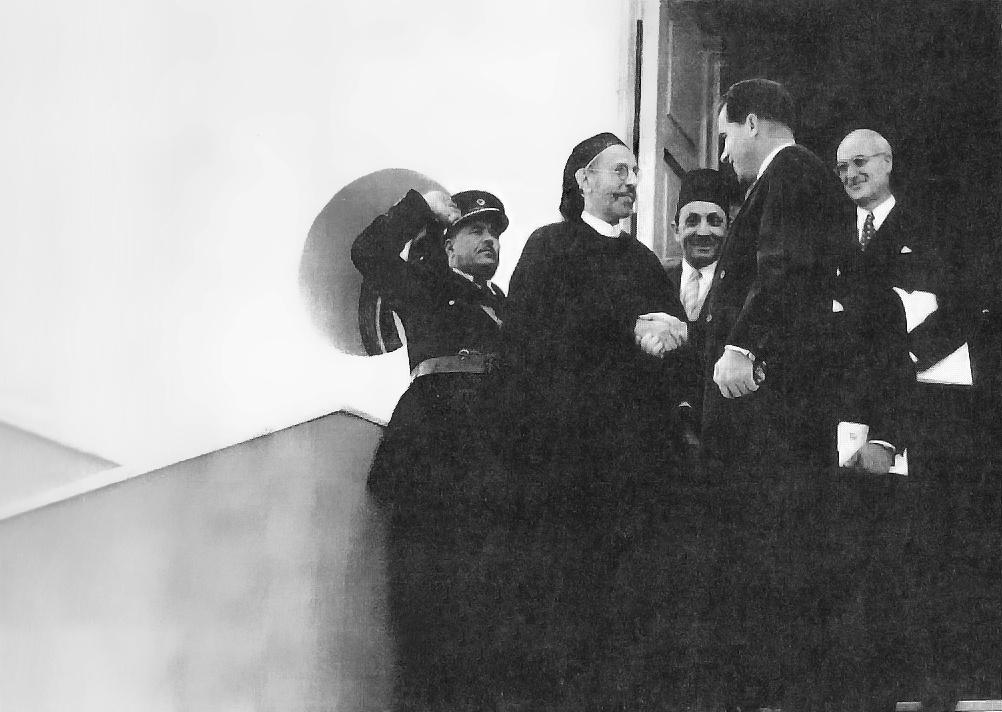
King Idris with U.S. vice-president Richard Nixon in March 1957. Libya sought cordial relations with the West.

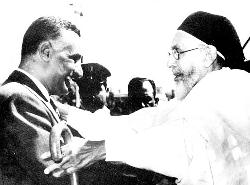
King Idris meeting Abdel Nasser, President of Egypt.

In regional affairs, Libya enjoyed the advantage of not having aggravated boundary disputes with its neighbors. Libya was one of the thirty founding members of the Organization of African Unity (OAU), established in 1963, and in November 1964 participated with Morocco, Algeria, and Tunisia in forming a joint consultative committee aimed at economic cooperation among North African states. Although it supported Arab causes, including the Moroccan and Algerian independence movements, Libya took little active part in the Arab-Israeli dispute or the tumultuous inter-Arab politics of the 1950s and the early 1960s.

Nevertheless, the brand of Arab nationalism advanced by Egypt's Gamal Abdel Nasser exercised an increasing influence, particularly among the younger Libyan generation that were influenced by the influx of Egyptian teachers into Libya. As one report suggests:

The presence of Egyptian teachers explains why so many classrooms show the influence of Egyptian propaganda. Pupils do crayon drawings of Egyptian troops winning victories over Israel or Britain. In Benghazi, Libya, a complete course in Egyptian history is given to secondary school students. A display in a high school art exhibit showed pictures of the leading rules of Egypt; on one side were the "bad" rulers, on the other the "good" rulers. The bad rulers began with the Pharaoh Cheops, who enslaved his people to build the pyramids, and ended with Farouk. The good rulers began with the idealistic Pharaoh Ikhnaton and ended with, of course, Gamal Abdel Nasser.

In response to anti-Western agitation in 1964, Libya's essentially pro-Western government requested the evacuation of British and American bases before the dates specified in the treaties. Most British forces were in fact withdrawn in 1966, although the evacuation of foreign military installations, including Wheelus Air Base, was not completed until March 1970.

Footage from Tripoli International Fairground, 1962

The Six-Day War between Israel and its Arab neighbors sparked violent demonstrations including attacks on the United States and British embassies and oil company offices. Members of the Jewish community were also attacked, prompting the emigration of almost all remaining Libyan Jews.

Although Libya was clearly on record as supporting Arab causes in general, the country did not play an important role in Arab politics. At the Arab summit conference held at Khartoum in September 1967, however, Libya, along with Saudi Arabia and Kuwait, agreed to provide generous subsidies from oil revenues to aid Egypt, Syria, and Jordan, defeated in June by Israel. Also, Idris first broached the idea of taking collective action to increase the price of oil on the world market. Libya, nonetheless, continued its close association with the West, while Idris' government steered an essentially conservative course at home.

=== 1969 coup and end of the monarchy ===
The monarchy came to an end on 1 September 1969 when a group of military officers led by Muammar Gaddafi staged a coup d'état against King Idris while he was in Turkey for medical treatment. The revolutionaries arrested the army chief of staff and the head of security in the kingdom. After hearing about the coup, King Idris dismissed it as "unimportant".

The coup pre-empted King Idris' instrument of abdication dated 4 August 1969 to take effect 2 September 1969 in favour of the Crown Prince, who had been appointed regent following the king's departure for Turkey. Following the overthrow of the monarchy the country was renamed the Libyan Arab Republic.

In 2013 the African Union commemorated King Idris' legacy as an African hero and the architect of Libya's independence from Italy's colonial rule in a public event. In fact, Idris remains widely regarded as the father of an independent and unified Libya who led the country through its resistance to the colonial powers. As a quiet but firm ruler, he played a unifying role both in Libya, between the various strains of Islam and the plethora of Libyan tribes, and across the region. He is remembered as "uncompromising" against his enemies, no matter the consequences of his actions. The obituary posted by Associated Press in 1983 recalled that he stripped thirty members of the royal household of their privileges and rights, exiled seven princes and ruled in favor of the execution of one of his nephews, who had murdered a trusted royal adviser.

== Aftermath ==
=== 2011 Libyan revolution ===
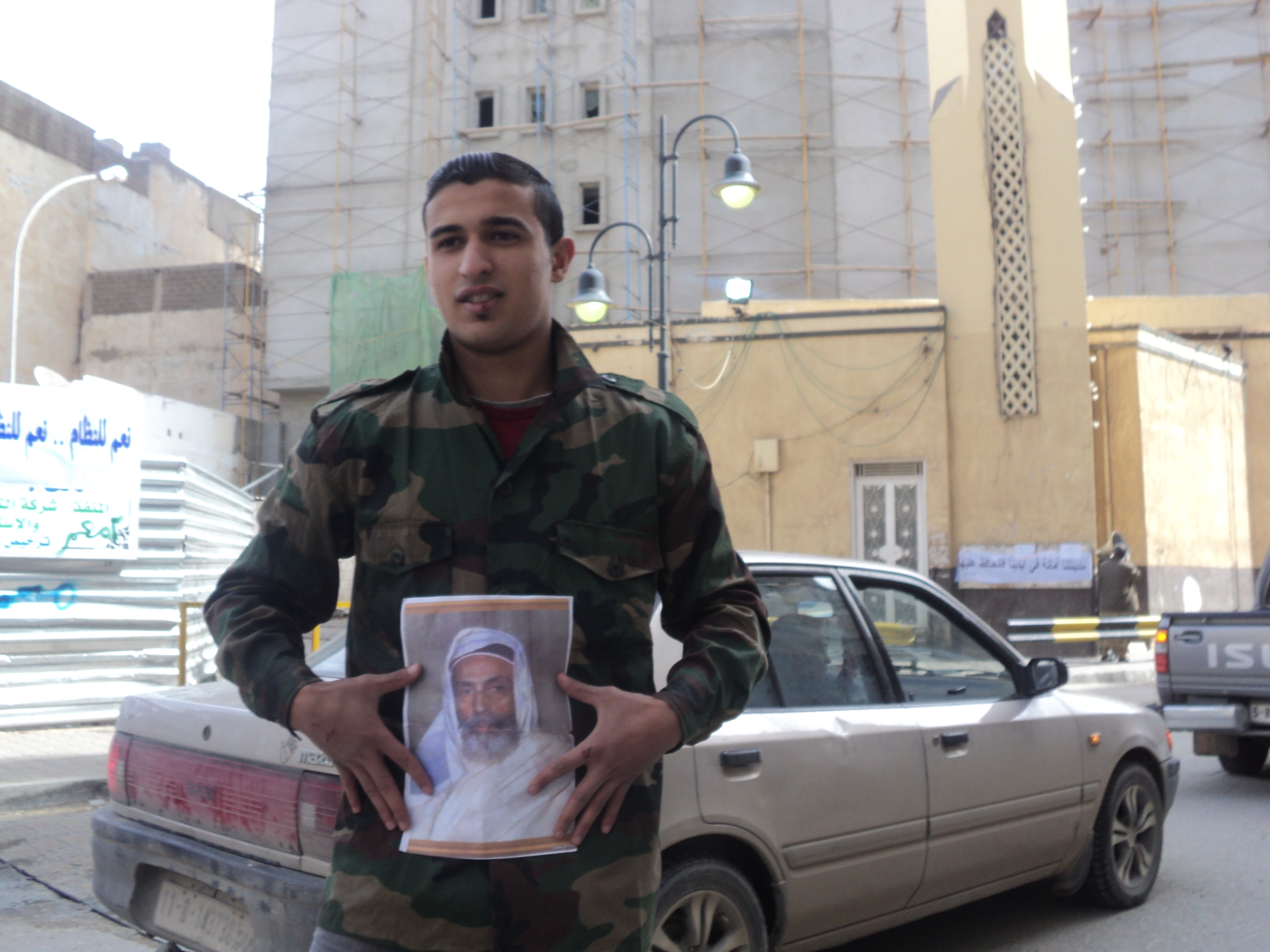
A young Benghazian carrying King Idris's photo during the 2011 civil war.

Although the king and the crown prince died in exile and most of the younger generation of Libyans were born after the monarchy, the Senussi dynasty has enjoyed somewhat of a comeback during the 2011 Libyan civil war, especially in the dynasty's traditional stronghold of Cyrenaica. Demonstrators against Colonel Gaddafi, some carrying portraits of the king, used the old tricolour flag of the monarchy and played the old national anthem Libya, Libya, Libya. Two of the surviving Senussi exiles were planning to return to Libya to support the protestors.

== Government ==
The United Kingdom of Libya was a constitutional and hereditary monarchy with legislative power being exercised by the monarch in conjunction with parliament.

=== King ===
King of Libya
- Royal Coat of arms

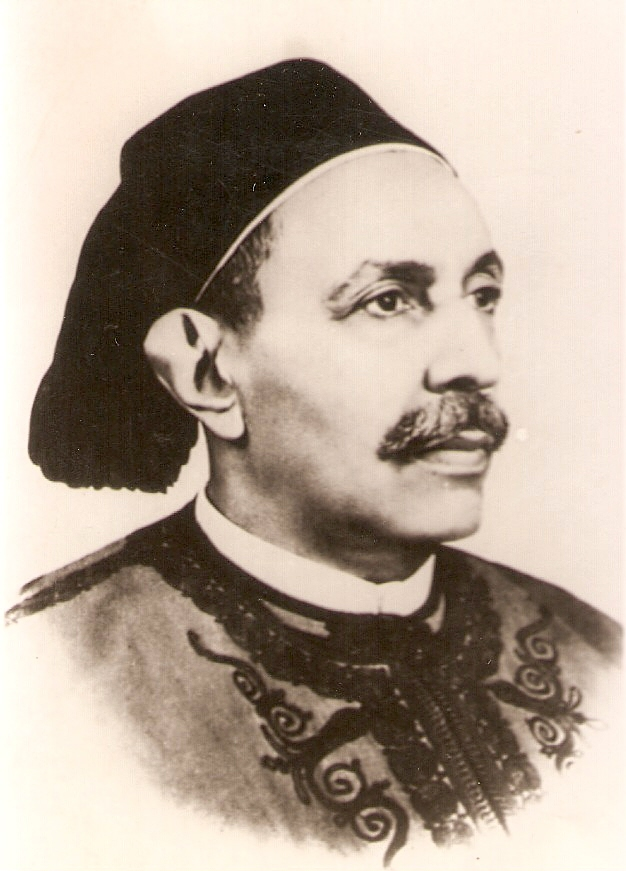
- Idris I

Details
- First monarch: Idris I
- Last monarch: Idris I
- Formed: 24 December 1951
- Abolished: 1 September 1969
- Residence: Royal Palace
- Appointer: Hereditary
- Pretender: Mohammed El Senussi

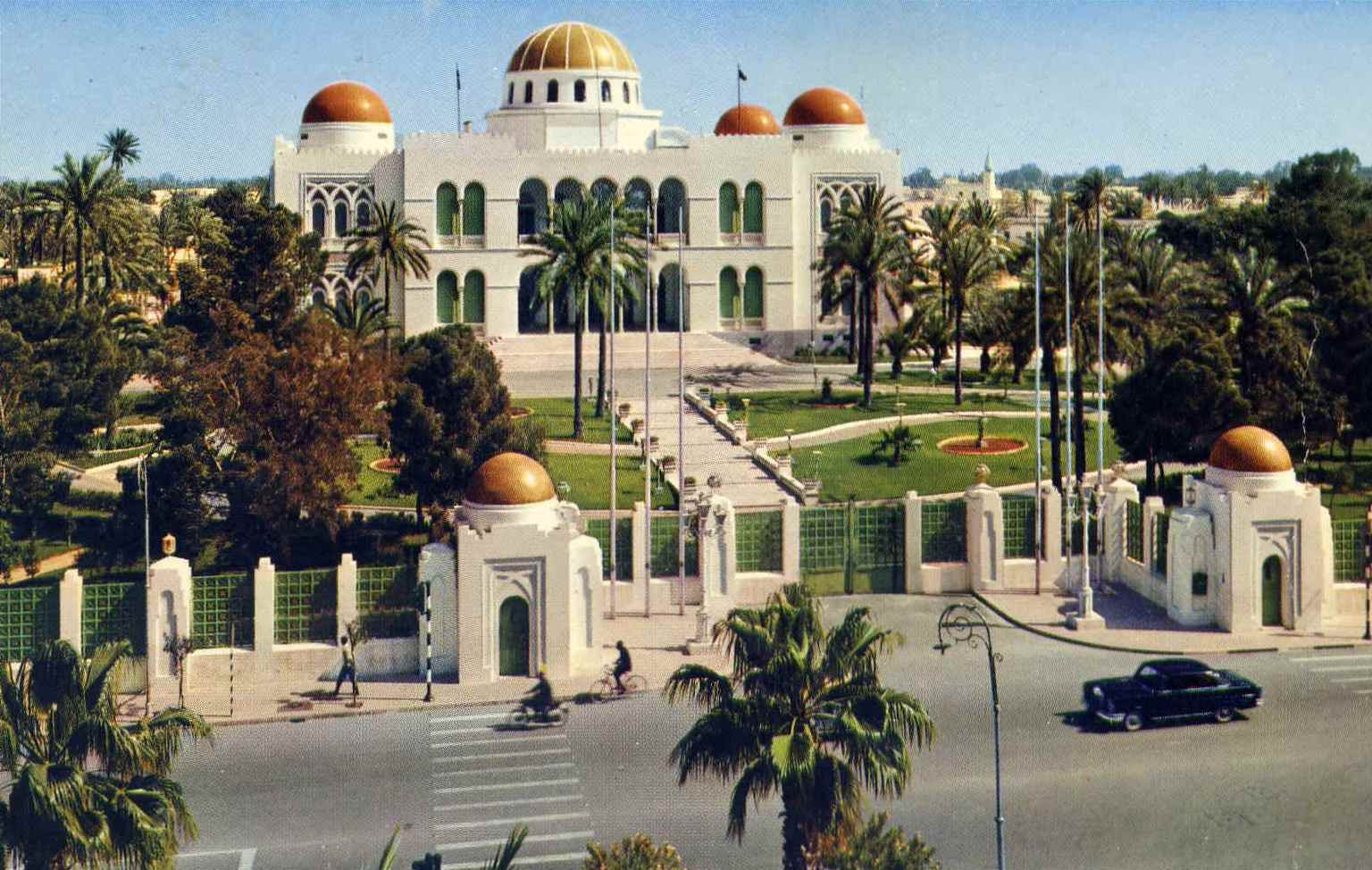
Royal Palace of Tripoli

The King was defined by the constitution as the supreme head of state. Before he is able to assume constitutional powers the King would need to take an oath before a joint session of the Senate and the House of Representatives. All laws passed by Parliament of the Kingdom of Libya needed to be sanctioned and promulgated by the king. It was also the king's responsibility to open and close the sessions of Parliament, it is also his responsibility to dissolve the House of Representatives in line with the constitution. The king was head of the kingdom's armed forces.

=== Council of ministers ===
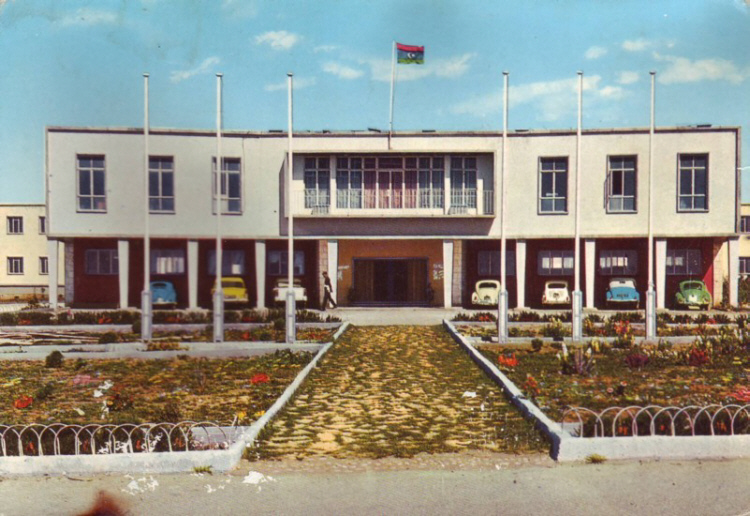
Prime Minister's office in Bayda (1965)

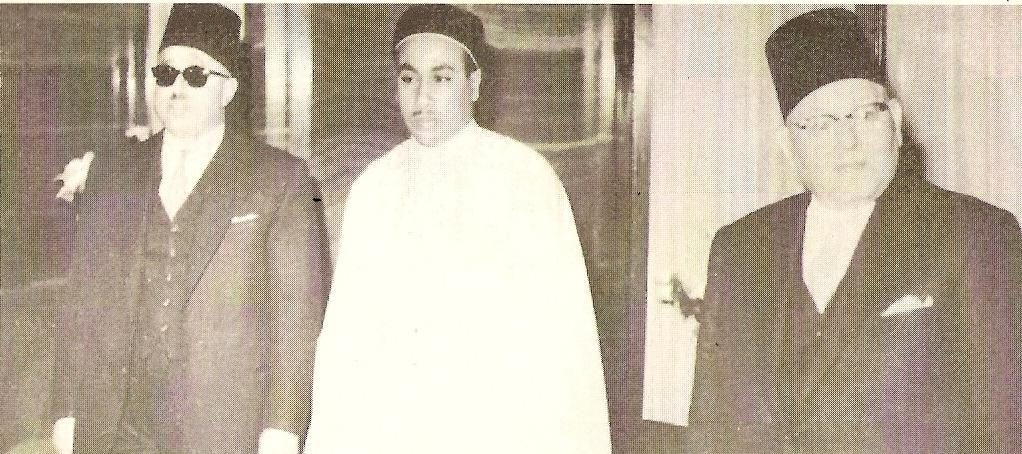
Left to right: Prime Minister Abdul Majid Kubar, Crown Prince Hasan and Governor of Tripolitania Taher Bakeer

The King was responsible for appointing and removing Prime Ministers. The king also appointed and dismissed ministers based on the advice of the Prime Minister. The Council of Ministers were responsible for the direction of the internal and external affairs of the country and the council were accountable to the House of Representatives. Once a prime minister was removed from office this automatically resulted in dismissal of all the other ministers.

== Parliament ==
The Kingdom's parliament consisted of two chambers, the Senate and the House of Representatives. Both chambers met and closed at the same time.

The Senate was made up of twenty-four members appointed by the King. A seat in the Senate was restricted to Libyan nationals of at least forty years. The King appointed the President of the Senate, with the Senate itself electing two vice presidents which the King would then need to approve. The president and vice president served for a fixed two-year term. At the end of this term, the King was free to reappoint the president or replace them with someone else while the vice presidents faced re-election. The term of office for a senator was eight years. A senator could not serve for consecutive terms but could be reappointed in the future. Half of all the senators were to be replaced every four years.

Members of the House of Representatives were elected through universal suffrage following the constitutional change on 25 April 1963. Women had previously not been able to vote. The number of deputies in the house was determined on the basis of one deputy for twenty thousand people. Elections were held every four years unless parliament was dissolved earlier. The deputies were responsible for electing a speaker and two vice-speakers for the house.

== Subdivisions ==
=== Provinces ===
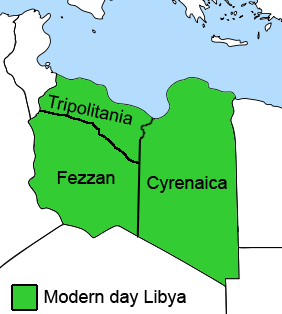
Pre-1963 provinces

Following independence until 1963, the Kingdom was organised into three provinces: Tripolitania province, Cyrenaica province and Fezzan province, which are the three historic regions of Libya. Autonomy in the provinces was exercised through provincial governments and legislatures.

Province	Capital	Area
Tripolitania province	Tripoli	106,500 sq mi (276,000 km^{2})
Cyrenaica province	Benghazi	330,000 sq mi (850,000 km^{2})
Fezzan province	Sabha	243,500 sq mi (631,000 km^{2})

=== 1963 reorganisation ===
Following a change in the constitution abolishing the federal makeup of the country in 1963 the three provinces were reorganised into ten governorates (muhafazah in Arabic) which were ruled by an appointed governor.

- Bayda, formerly part of Cyrenaica
- Al Khums, formerly part of Tripolitania
- Awbari, formerly part of Fezzan
- Az Zawiyah, formerly part of Tripolitania
- Benghazi, formerly part of Cyrenaica
- Darnah, formerly part of Cyrenaica
- Gharian, formerly part of Fezzan and Tripolitania
- Misrata, formerly part of Tripolitania
- Sabha, formerly part of Fezzan
- Tarabulus, formerly part of Tripolitania

== Legacy ==
Since Muammar Gaddafi's four-decade rule ended in 2011, Libya has struggled to establish basic institutions and rule of law. The 1951 Constitution as amended in 1963 has been at the center of political debate over the past years. In fact, the document continues to be widely regarded as an important instrument and a solid base towards the solution of Libya's political crisis.

Growing support on the ground in Libya that a Constitutional monarchy based on the pre-revolutionary constitution should be reinstated as a force for stability, unity, and just governance has emerged since 2011. Libyan exiles, as well as prominent political actors and local groups, have publicly backed the reinstatement of the Senussi Monarchy under the leadership of Prince Mohammed el-Senussi as an attractive political option in Libya. The Movement for the Return of Constitutional Legitimacy and its affiliated groups in Libya advocate for the reinstatement of the 1951 Constitution and the return of the Senussi monarchy under Mohammed El Senussi's leadership.

Interviewed by Al-Hayat in April 2014, then-Libyan Minister of Foreign Affairs Mohamed Abdelaziz stated that the return of the Constitutional Monarchy within the institutional limits set up by the 1951 Constitution before the 1963 amendments could serve as a unifying symbol for the nation and a "political umbrella" that would guarantee the legitimacy of Libya's institutions in the face of calls for a federal solution and sectarian conflict.

In July 2015, support to restore the implementation of the 1951 Constitution and to encourage the return of the Monarchy was publicly expressed by several members of the Constitution Drafting Assembly (CDA), the committee tasked with writing a new constitution, through a petition circulated through social media as well as through a formal letter issued by Ali Hussain Bubaker, then-mayor of Baida, an important city in the east of Libya.

In August 2015 a Cyrenaican federalist party, the National Federal Bloc, asked the Parliament to endorse the 1951 Constitution as a legitimate Constitution for the whole country. The party held a meeting in Bayda attended by Cyrenaican authorities as well as by members of the Tobruk-based House of Representatives under the slogan "The return to the unamended Constitution of the founding fathers of 1951 to ensure the unity of the Libyan nation". A conclusive statement authored by the organizers reiterated the necessity to regard the 1951 Constitution as the sole means to achieve political reunification in Libya.

Notably, on 4 June 2015 Daniel Kawczynski, a member of the Foreign Affairs Select Committee in the British Parliament, published a piece advocating for the return of the 1951 Constitution as amended in 1963 in line with the growing grassroots support registered in the major cities across Libya.

In general, growing interest in the viability and relevance of that solution both on the ground and internationally was recorded in February 2016 by Declan Walsh, a New York Times reporter who spent considerable time in Libya. The increasing volume of social media pages and activities on the subject has mirrored that trend.

Prince Mohammed el-Senussi has acknowledged the growing enthusiasm towards the reinstatement of the 1951 Constitution and the Constitutional Monarchy. He has consistently stressed that he would be honored to return and serve his country if the Libyan people demanded it.

== See also ==
- Federation of Arab Republics
- List of heads of government of Libya
