= Fezzan province =

Traditional province of Libya

Fezzan ⴼⵣⵣⴰⵏ (Berber languages) فزان (Arabic)
- Region
- Fezzan was a governorate within both Italian Libya and the Kingdom of Libya, 1934–1963.
- Country: Libya
- Capital: Sabha

Area
  - Total: 551,170 km^{2} (212,810 sq mi)

Population (2006)
  - Total: 442,090
  - Density: 0.80209/km^{2} (2.0774/sq mi)

Fezzan province is one of the three traditional Provinces of Libya. It was a formal province from 1934 until 1963, when it was subdivided into the Governorates of Libya. Its capital was the city of Sabha.

In 1963, the province was split into:

- Awbari Governorate
- Gharian Governorate
- Sabha Governorate

== Administration ==
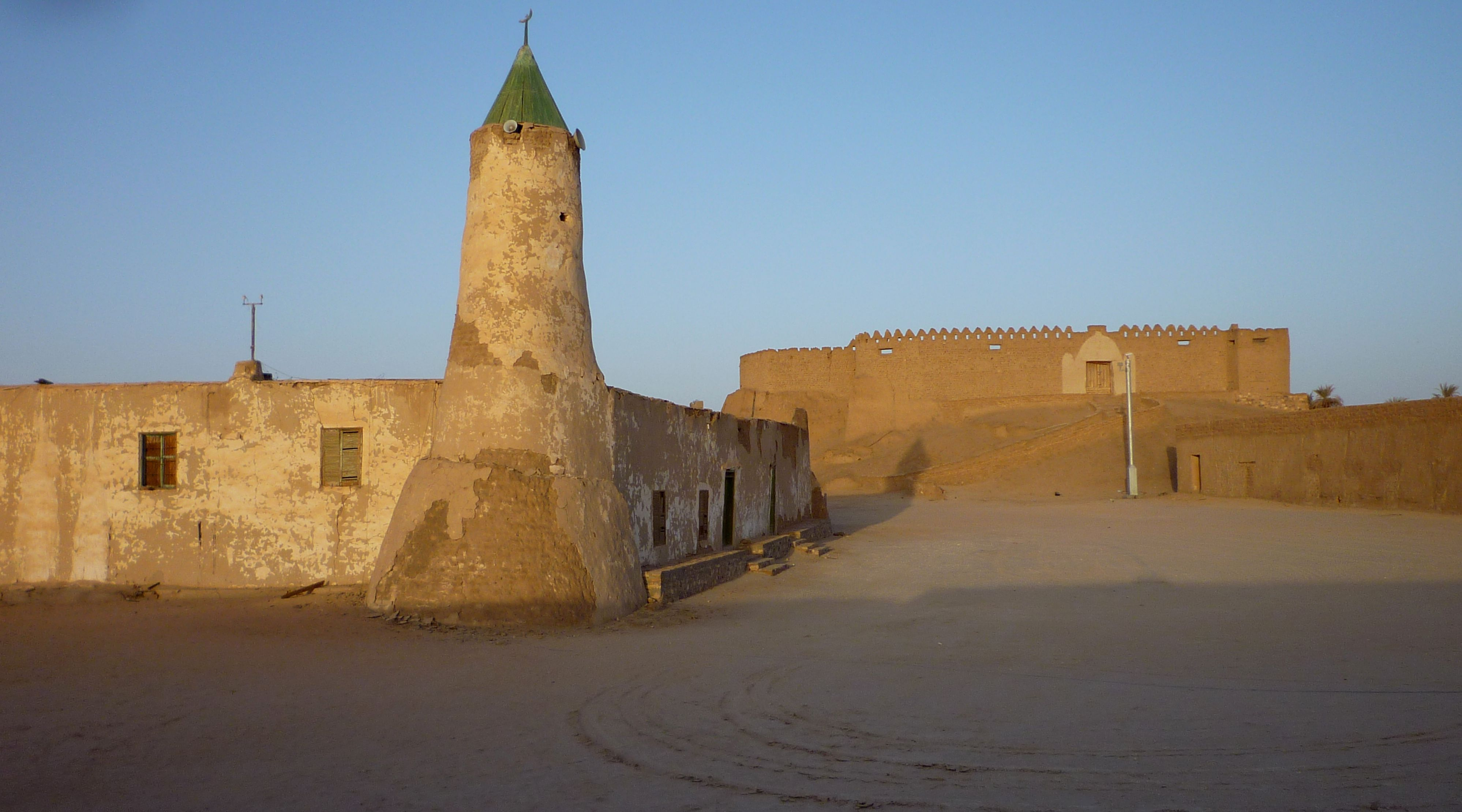
Fort and mosque of Murzuk

Fezzan was a province under the Ottoman Turks and Italy, and a province (wilayah) or governorate (muhafazah) of independent Libya (alongside Tripolitania and Cyrenaica) until 1963. With the introduction of the new administrative division of Libya in 1963, Fezzan was abolished as an independent administrative unit and was divided into the muhafazat of Awbari and Sabha. In 1983, these administrative divisions were abolished in favour of smaller districts or baladiyah. The Baladiyat-system was reorganized in 1987 and was replaced in 1995 by the sha'biyat-system.

The former Fezzan province contains the districts (sha'biyat) of Wadi al Shatii, Wadi al Hayaa, Jufra, Ghadames, Murzuq, Sabha and Ghat (some maps allocate Ghadames to the neighbouring region of Tripolitania). The historic capital, largest city, political and administrative centre is Sabha.

== Population ==
The region's inhabitants include the Berber, the Dawada, the nomadic Tuareg in the southwest, and the Toubou in the southeast. These pastoralist populations often cross the borders of Algeria, Chad and Niger freely. In the north, Arab, Berber and settled Tuareg and Toubou mix. While making up some 30% of the land area of Libya, the Fezzan supports only a small percentage of its population. Large towns like Sabha survive on near-surface water in the wadis of the north and west. The northeast area is dominated by Haruj, a large and unpopulated volcanic field.

Fezzan's population has grown rapidly since the mid-20th century along with the overall growth in Libya's population, and the province's share of the national population has increased by half.

Year	Population	Percent of Libya's population
1954	59,315	5.4
1964	79,326	5.1
1973	128,012	5.7
1984	213,915	5.9
1995	352,276	7.3
2006	442,090	7.8

Source: Gathered from bulletins of censuses 1964, 1973, 1995, 2006.
