= Tripolitania =

Historic region of Libya

Coordinates: 32.9000°N 13.1833°E

Tripolitania طرابلس (Arabic)
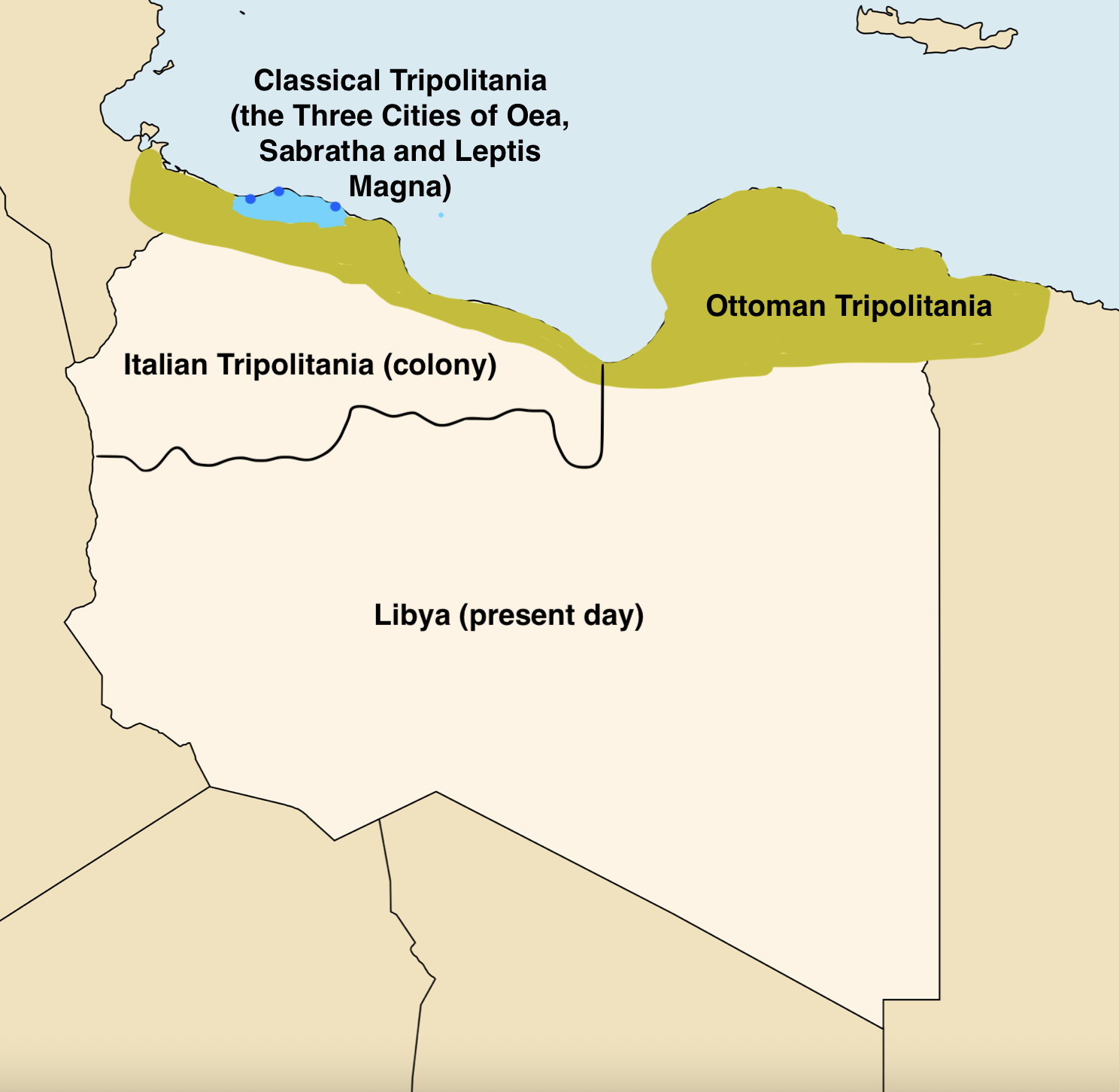
- Historical definitions of Tripolitania
- Capital: Tripoli

Tripolitania /trɪpɒlɪˈteɪniə/ (Arabic: طرابلس), historically known as the Tripoli region, is a historic region and former province of Libya.

The region had been settled since antiquity, first coming to prominence as part of the Carthaginian empire. Following the defeat of Carthage in the Punic Wars, Ancient Rome organized the region (along with what is now modern day Tunisia and eastern Algeria), into a province known as Africa, and placed it under the administration of a proconsul. During the Diocletian reforms of the late 3rd century, all of North Africa was placed into the newly created Diocese of Africa, of which Tripolitania was a constituent province.

After the fall of the Western Roman Empire in the 5th century, Tripolitania changed hands between the Vandals and the Byzantine Empire, until it was taken during the Muslim conquest of the Maghreb in the 8th century. It was part of the region known to the Islamic world as Ifriqiya, whose boundaries roughly mirrored those of the old Roman province of Africa Proconsularis. Though nominally under the suzerainty of the Abbasid Caliphate, local dynasties such as the Aghlabids and later the Fatimid Caliphate were practically independent. The native Berbers, who had inhabited the area locally for centuries before the arrival of the Arabs, established their own native Hafsid dynasty in Ifriqiya in the 13th century, and they controlled the region until it was conquered by the Ottoman Empire in the 15th century, who established Ottoman Tripolitania as a distinct province. Tripolitania became an Italian colony in 1911.

After the 1934 formation of Libya, the Tripolitania province was designated as one of the three primary provinces of the country, alongside Cyrenaica province to the east and Fezzan province to the south.

== Definition ==
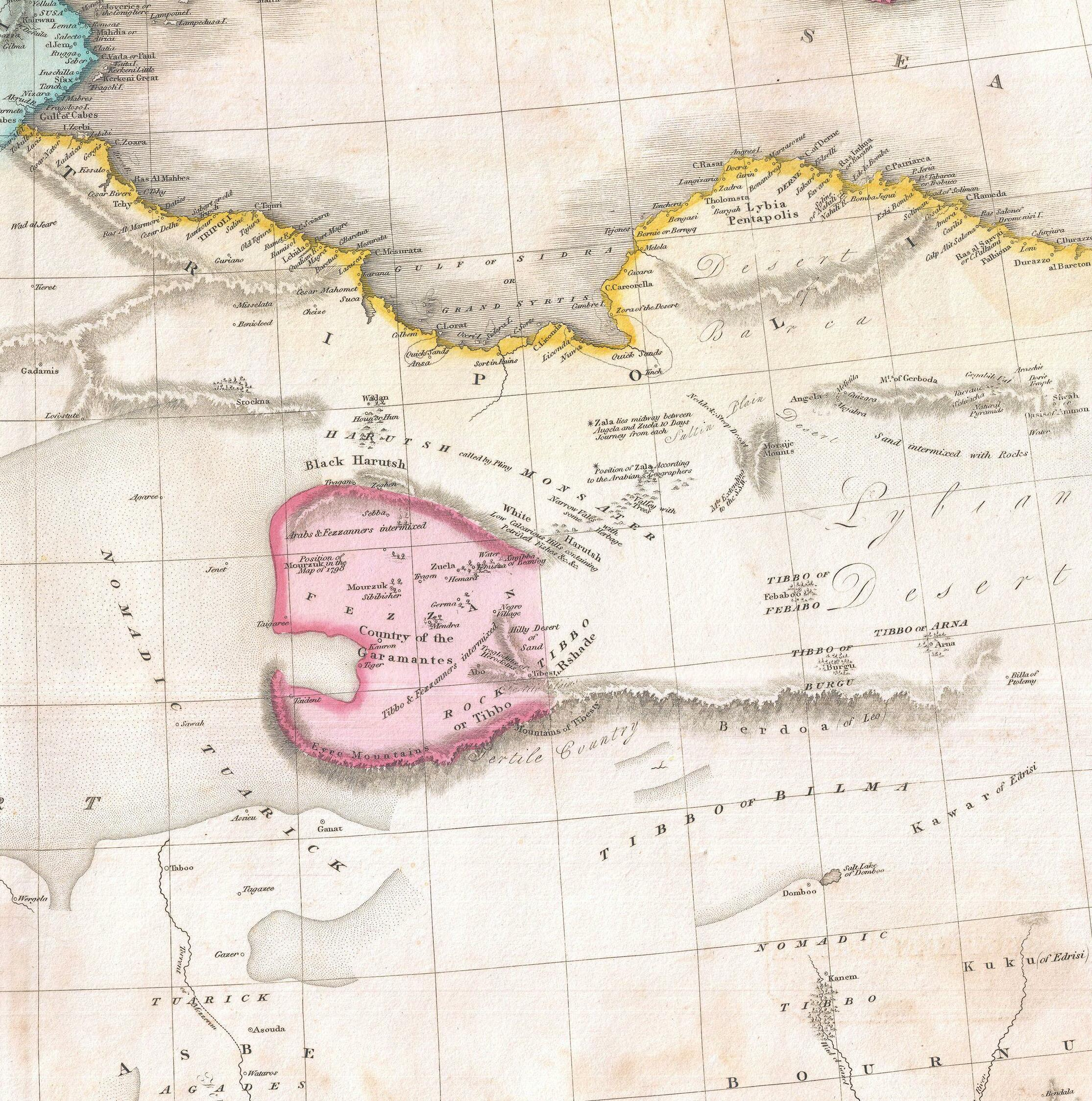
1818 Pinkerton map of Northern Africa, excerpt

Historically, the name Tripoli designated a region rather than a city, just as today in Arabic the same word Tarablus (طرابلس) is used for both the city and the region. The Arabic word used alone would be understood to mean only the city; in order to designate Tripolitania in Arabic, a qualifier such as "state", "province" or "sha'biyah" is required.

The region of Tripoli or Tripolitania derives from the Greek name Τρίπολις (Tripolis) "three cities", referring to Oea, Sabratha and Leptis Magna. Oea was the only one of the three cities to survive antiquity, and became known as Tripoli. Today Tripoli is the capital city of Libya and the northwestern portion of the country.

In addition to Tripoli, the following are among the largest and most important cities of Tripolitania: Misrata, Zawiya (near ancient Sabratha), Gharyan, Khoms (near ancient Leptis Magna), Tarhuna and Sirte.

== History ==
=== Antiquity ===
The city of Oea, on the site of modern Tripoli, was founded by the Phoenicians in the 7th century BC. It was conquered for a short time by the Greek colonists of Cyrenaica, who were in turn displaced by the Punics of Carthage. The Roman Republic captured Tripolitania in 146 BC, and the area prospered during the Roman Empire period. The Latin name Regio Tripolitania dates to the 3rd century. The Vandals took over in 435, and were in turn supplanted by the counter offensive of the Byzantine Empire in the 530s, under the leadership of emperor Justinian the Great and his general Belisarius.

=== Middle Ages ===
In the 7th century, Tripolitania was conquered by the Rashidun Caliphate, and its successors, the Umayyad and Abbasid Caliphates, inherited it.

The Fatimid Caliphate, founded by Isma'ili Muslims in 909 in Raqqada, Tunisia, ruled the area from Tunisia to Syria. In the 1140s, the Italo-Normans invaded Tripoli and created the brief Kingdom of Africa, which the Almohad Caliphate destroyed in 1156. Abu Zakariya Yahya, a vassal of the Almohads, established an independent state in Tunisia in 1229 and took control of Tripolitania shortly after. He founded the Hafsid dynasty, which controlled the region until the 16th century. During that century, wars between the Ottomans and the states ruled by the House of Habsburg repeatedly led to the region changing alliances, although the Hafsids continued to rule. Hafsid rule ended when the Ottoman Empire brought Abu Abdallah Muhammad VI ibn al-Hasan to Constantinople in 1574 and executed him.

=== Modern history ===
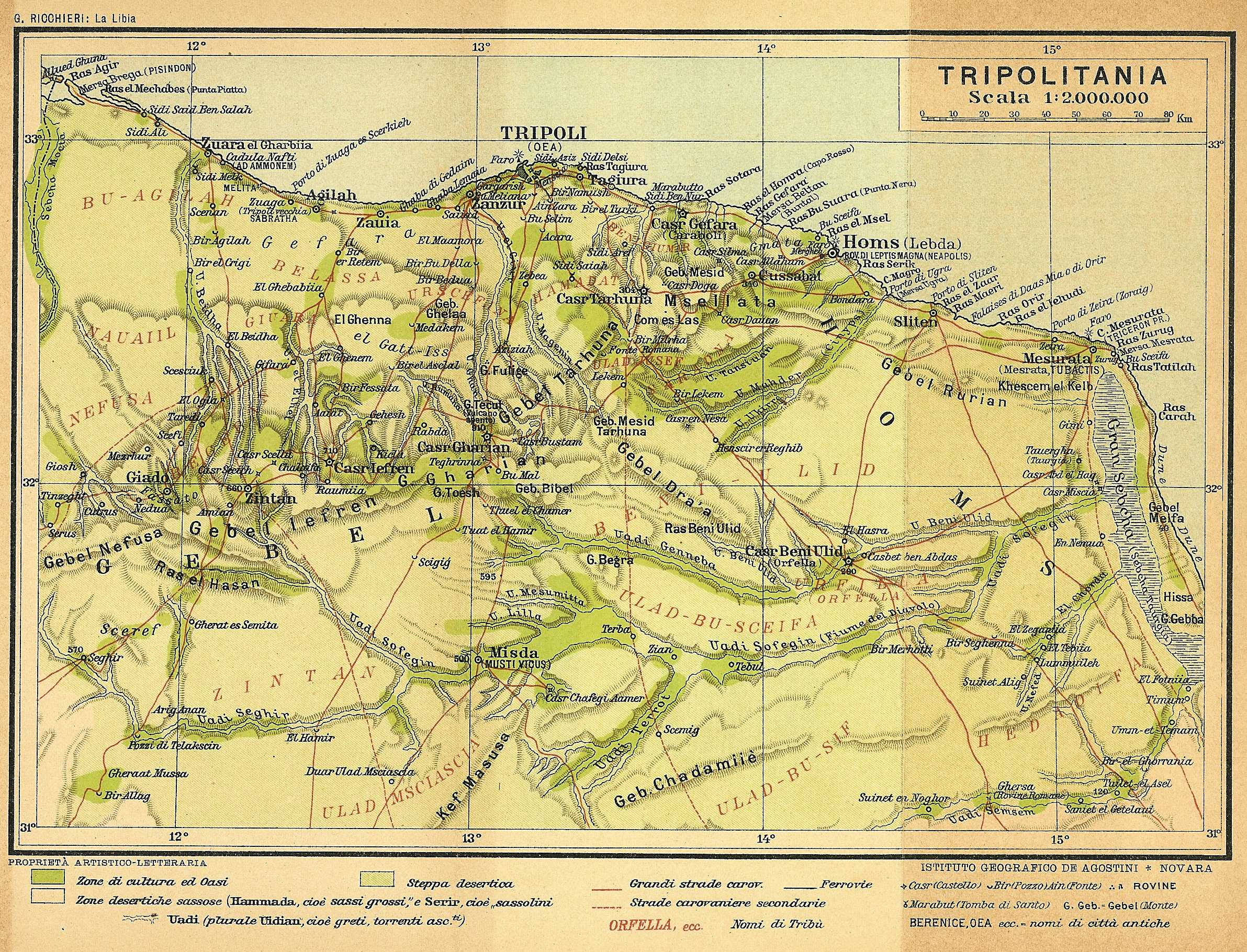
Detailed map of Tripolitania

Flag of the Tripolitania Vilayet (1864–1911)

Official coat of arms of the Italian Tripolitania

Ottoman Tripolitania (Ottoman Turkish: ایالت طرابلس غرب) extended beyond the region of Tripolitania proper, also including Cyrenaica. Tripolitania became effectively independent under the rulers of the Karamanli dynasty in 1711 until Ottoman control was re-imposed by Mahmud II in 1835. Ottoman rule persisted until the region was captured by Italy in the 1911–1912Italo-Turkish War. Italy officially granted autonomy after the war but gradually occupied the region.

After World War I, an Arab republic, Al-Jumhuriya al-Trabulsiya, or "Tripolitanian Republic", declared the independence of Tripolitania from Italian Libya. Its proclamation in autumn 1918 was followed by a formal declaration of independence at the 1919 Paris Peace Conference, which drafted the Treaty of Versailles. It was the first formally declared republican form of government in the Arab world, but it gained little support from international powers and had disintegrated by 1923. Italy, under the fascist dictator Benito Mussolini, had managed to re-establish full control over Libya by 1930.

Originally administered as part of a single colony, Italian Tripolitania was a separate colony from 26 June 1927 to 3 December 1934, when it was merged into Libya. The Italian fascists constructed the Marble Arch as a form of an imperial triumphal arch at the border between Tripolitania and Cyrenaica near the coast.

Tripolitania experienced a huge development in the late 1930s, when the Italian Fourth Shore was created with the Province of Tripoli, with Tripoli as a modern "westernized" city. The Tripoli Province ("Provincia di Tripoli" in Italian) was established in 1937, with the official name being Commissariato Generale Provinciale di Tripoli. It was considered a province of the Kingdom of Italy and lasted until 1943.

During World War II, several back-and-forth campaigns with mobile armour vehicles ebbed and flowed across the North African coastal deserts between first Fascist Italians and the British, with the Italians joined by the Nazi Germans in 1941. Libya was finally occupied by the western Allies, with the British moving west from Egypt after their victory at El Alamein in October 1942 against German Field Marshall Erwin Rommel and his Afrika Korps and the Americans and British from the west after landings in Operation Torch in Morocco and Algeria in November 1942. From 1942 and past the end of the war in 1945 to 1951, when Libya gained independence, Tripolitania and the region of Cyrenaica were administered by the British Military Administration. Italy formally renounced its claim upon the territory in 1947.

Tripolitania retained its status as a province in the Kingdom of Libya from 1951 to 1963, when it was replaced by a new system of governorates, which divided Tripolitania into the governorates of Khoms, Zawiya, Jabal al Gharbi, Misrata, and Tarabulus.

The Modern Latin missionary jurisdiction was called the Apostolic Vicariate of Tripolitana but was later renamed after its episcopal see, Benghazi.
