= Subdivisions of Libya =

Historical subdivision of Libya

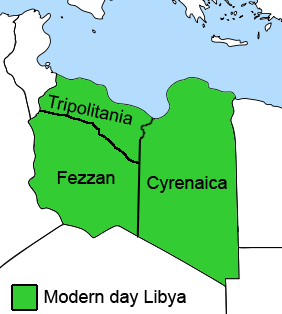
The three main historical subdivisions of Libya

Subdivisions of Libya have varied significantly over the last two centuries. Initially Libya under Ottoman and Italian control was organized into three to four provinces, then into three governorates (muhafazah) and after World War II into twenty-five districts (baladiyah). Successively into thirty-two districts (shabiyat) with three administrative regions, and then into twenty-two districts (shabiyat). In 2012 the ruling General National Congress divided the country into governorates (muhafazat) and districts (baladiyat). While the districts have been created, the governorates have not.

== History ==
Prior to the Italian invasion of 1911, the area of Libya was administered as three separate provinces ("Vilayets") of the Ottoman Empire: Tripolitania, Fezzan, and Cyrenaica.

At first, Italy continued the tripartite administration, but soon consolidated the area into a single province/governorate administered as the "Libyan Colony". Indeed, until about 1931 -when the last of the native resistance to the Italians was subdued- the area was divided into three historical regions (Tripolitania, Cyrenaica and Fezzan/"Territorio Sahara").

Then, in 1937, Italian governor Italo Balbo created the political entity called Libya. His Italian Libya was re-divided into four provinces and one territory: Tripoli, Misurata, Benghazi, Derna, (in the coastal north) and the "Southern Military Territory" (Italian: Territorio Militare del Sud) (in the Saharan south).

After the French and British occupied Libya in 1943, it was again split into three provinces: Tripolitania in the northwest, Cyrenaica in the east, and Fezzan-Ghadames in the southwest.

After independence, Libya was divided into three governorates (muhafazat), matching the three provinces of before, but in 1963 it was divided into ten governorates.

== Provinces ==
The Provinces of Libya existed during the last period of colonial Italian Libya through post-independence Libya. The country was divided into provinces from 1934 in the colonial era to 1963 when the Governorates system was instituted.

== Governorates ==
The Governorates of Libya (muhafazah) were an administrative division of Libya from 1963 until 1983. Initially there were 46 governorates-districts, called baladiyah, that were reduced to 25 in 1987.

Libyan governorates-districts ("Baladiyah") in 1987

بلدية	Baladiyah	Main city	Population (in 1984)	Number (on the map)
طبرق	Butnan	Tobruk	94,006	3
درنة	Darnah	Derna	105,031	14
الجبل الاخضر	Jabal al Akhdar	Bayda	120,662	5
المرج	Marj	Marj	102,763	4
بنغازي	Benghazi	Benghazi	485,386	13
إجدابيا	Al Wahat	Ajdabiya	100,547	1
الكفرة	Kufra	Al Jawf	25,139	8
سرت	Sirte	Sirte	110,996	21
مصراتة	Misratah	Misrata	178,295	17
خمس	Khoms	Khoms	149,642	7
طرابلس	Tripoli (Tarabulus)	Tripoli	990,697	22
العزيزيه	Al 'Aziziyah	'Aziziya	85,068	2
الزاوية	Az Zawiyah	Zawiya	220,075	12
النقاط الخمس	Nuqat al Khams	Zuwara	181,584	9
الجبل الغربي	Gharyan	Gharyan	117,073	16
زليطن	Zlitan	Zliten	101,107	25
الجفرة	Al Jufrah	Waddan	?	6
الشاطئ	Ash Shati'	Brak	46,749	10
سبها	Sabha	Sabha	76,171	19
أوباري	Awbari	Ubari	48,701	11
غدامس	Ghadamès	Ghadames	52,247	15
	Sawfajjin	Bani Walid	45,195	20
مرزق	Mourzouq	Murzuk	42,294	18
ترهونة	Tarhounah	Tarhuna	84,640	23
يفرن	Yafran	Yafran	73,420	24
Total			3,637,488	

== Baladiyat ==
In 1983, a new system was introduced dividing the country into forty-six districts (baladiyat also sometimes translated as municipalities). In 1987 this number was reduced to twenty-five.

In Libya there are currently 106 districts, second level administrative subdivisions known as baladiyat (singular baladiyah). The number has varied since 2013 between 99 and 108.

== Districts ==
On 2 August 1995, Libya reorganized into thirteen districts (sha`biyat - singular sha`biyah, also translated as municipalities or popularates). In 1998 this was increased to twenty-six districts (sha`biyat). In 2001 it was increased to thirty-two districts plus three administrative regions. Finally in 2007 the number was reduced to twenty-two districts.

=== Basic People's Congresses ===
Under Gaddafi Libyan districts were further subdivided into Basic People's Congresses Arabic: مؤتمر شعبي أساسي (Mu'tamar shaʿbi asāsi ). Geographically they corresponded approximately to the level of a township or borough. In desert areas they often had an extensive land area with very low population, and were generally centered on, and named for, an oasis.

== Overview ==
year	number of divisions	name of divisions
historically (Persians)	1(?) Barqa Shatrapani/Satrapy	Shatrapani/satrapy
historically (Greeks)	1(?) Libya Satrapy	satrapy
historically Roman Empire	Roman Libya: Creta et Cyrenaica	province
historically Ottoman Empire (Ottoman Tripolitania)	Ottoman Tripolitania 1	vilayet
colonised territory (1st phase); Italian North Africa, from 1912 to 1927	1 (Italian Libya) or 2	governorate or province
colonised territory (2nd phase); Italian North Africa from 1927 to 1934	2 (Italian Cyrenaica, Italian Tripolitania) also Fezzan?	governorate or province
colonised territory (3rd phase); Italian Libya from 1934 to 1937	3 (Cyrenaica, Fezzan, Tripolitania) or 4 or 1	province
colonised territory (4th phase); Provinces of the Fourth Shore within the Italian Colonial Empire from 1937 to 1940	4 (Tripoli, Bengazi, Derna, Misurata) or 5 (along with Southern Military Territory) or 1	province
colonised territory (5th phase) after World War II from 1943 to 1951	3 (Cyrenaica and Tripolitania were British; Fezzan-Ghadames was French)	province
after independence in 1951-1952 (Kingdom of Libya)	3	muhafazah (governorate)
in Kingdom of Libya after 1963 and in Libyan Jamahiriya after 1969 coup d'état	10	muhafazah (governorate)
after 1983	46	baladiyah
after 1987-1988	25	baladiyah
after 1995	13	shabiyah (district)
after 1998	26	shabiyah (district)
after 2001	32	shabiyah (district)
after 2007	22	shabiyah (district)
after 2013	99 to 108	baladiyah
after 2022	19	Muqata'ah (provinces)

== See also ==
- Districts of Libya
- Governorates of Libya
- Provinces of Libya
- Basic People's Congress
