= Provinces of Libya =

Traditional administrative divisions of Libya

Map of traditional provinces of Libya.

The Provinces of Libya were established in 1934, during the last period of colonial Italian Libya, and continued through post-independence Libya until 1963 when the Governorates system was instituted.

The three main provinces of the country follow the original colonial divisions of Italian Libya: Tripolitania province, Cyrenaica province and Fezzan province.

== Italian colonial era ==
After Italy took the area from the Ottoman Empire in 1912 during the Italo-Turkish War, it was administered as a single administrative unit, called Italian North Africa. Then, from 1927 to 1934, the territory was split into two separate colonies, each of which run by its own Italian governor: Italian Cyrenaica and Italian Tripolitania. In 1934, Italy adopted the name "Libya" (Italian Libya) as the official name of the reunified area and administratively divided it up into the three provinces of Cyrenaica, Tripolitania and Fezzan. In 1937, the Cyrenaica and Tripolitania provinces split, with northern Cyrenaica becoming Benghazi Province and Darnah Province and northern Tripolitania splitting into Tripoli Province and Misurata Province.

Fezzan was not split in 1937, but the whole southern Sahara Desert area was militarily administered as the Southern Military Territory (Territorio del Sahara Libico or Il Territorio Militare del Sud Libico).

The Libyan Sahara Territory was divided into four military districts administered from the desert oases towns of Ghat, Brak, Murzuk and Hun. The Senussi order Kufra oasis area in the southeastern Libyan Desert was not separately administered by the Italians, but in 1932, they built a fort at the holy place of El Tag above it. This territory was administered only by the Italian military and in 1936 was increased with the inclusion of Aouzou Strip from France's Chad.

== World War II and independence ==
The French and British occupied Libya in 1943 after the Western Desert Campaign victories, when it was again split into three provinces: Tripolitania in the northwest, Cyrenaica in the east and Fezzan-Ghadames in the southwest.

After independence in 1951, the three provinces continued as the subdivision system in the Kingdom of Libya, with boundaries slightly shifting, until 1963. The provinces were then replaced by the Muhafazah governorates system (muhafazah) system in the kingdom and subsequent Libyan Arab Republic until they were superseded by the 1983 Baladiyat districts system.

== See also ==
- Italian colonization of Libya
- Subdivisions of Libya
- Districts of Libya
- Governorates of Libya
