= Benghazi Governorate =

Governorate of Libya

Coordinates: 26°27′N 21°39′E

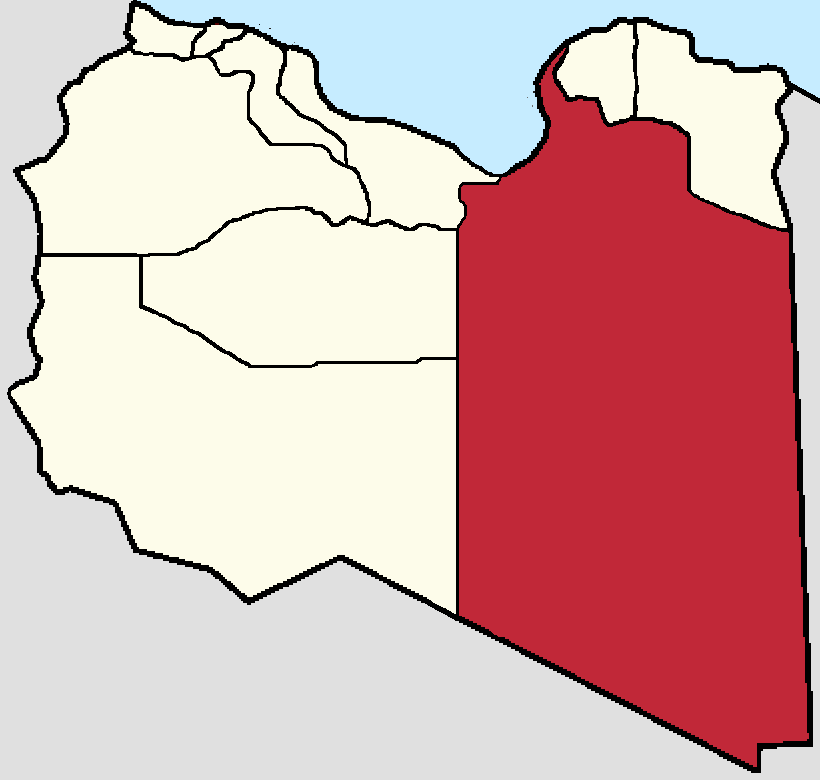

Benghazi Governorate was one of the governorates (muhafazah) of Libya from 1963 to 1983. It was created out of the Cyrenaica province. Its capital was the town of Benghazi.

- Beida Governorate – east
- Misrata Governorate – west
- Sebha Governorate – west
- Ubari Governorate – west

== See also ==
- Benghazi Province
