= Barassi (name) =

Barassi is an Italian surname. Notable people with the name include:

- Abd-Rabbo al-Barassi, Libyan politician
- Carlo Barassi (1910–?), Italian alpine skier
- Eugenio Mimica Barassi (1949–2021), Chilean writer
- Hanane Al-Barassi (1963–2020), Libyan activist
- Ludovico Barassi (1873–1956), Italian jurist
- Ottorino Barassi (1898–1971), Italian sports official
- Pierre-Louis Barassi (born 1998), French rugby union player
- Ron Barassi (1936–2023), Australian rules football player and coach
- Ron Barassi Sr. (1913–1941), Australian rules football player

== Stage name ==
- Ron Hitler-Barassi, stage name of Peter Minack, Australian musician and teacher
