= Barassi =

Barassi is an Italian word. It may refer to:

- Barassi (name)
- Barassi (play), a play by Tee O'Neill about Ron Barassi
- Barassi Line, imaginary line in Australia which approximately divides areas where Australian rules football or rugby league is the most popular football code
- Barassi International Australian Football Youth Tournament, international Australian rules football tournament for junior players
- Coppa Ottorino Barassi, defunct amateur association football competition
