= Mizdah Formation =

Geologic formation in the Awbari Governorate, southwestern Libya

- Stratigraphic range: Cenomanian-Turonian; ~99–89 Ma
- Type: Formation

Lithology
- Primary: Sandstone

Location
- Coordinates: 26.6°N 12.8°E
- Approximate paleocoordinates: 9.4°N 9.1°E
- Region: Awbari Governorate
- Country: Libya
- Extent: Idehan Ubari, Libyan Desert
- Mizdah Formation (Libya)

The Mizdah Formation is a geologic formation in the Awbari Governorate, southwestern Libya. The unit preserves fossils dating back to the Cenomanian and Turonian stages of the early Late Cretaceous period.

== Fossil content ==
The formation has provided the following fossils:

Fish

- Carcharias amonensis
- Distobatus sp.
- Onchopristis sp.
- Protopterus sp.
- Chondrichthyes indet.
- Enchodontidae indet.
- Lepisosteidae indet.
- Osteichthyes indet.
- Pycnodontidae indet.

Reptiles

- Simoliophis libycus
- Crocodylia indet.
- Testudines indet.
- ?Sauropoda indet.
- ?Theropoda indet.

Mammals

- Mammalia indet.

== See also ==
- Echkar and Farak Formations, contemporaneous fossiliferous formations of Niger
- Kem Kem Group, contemporaneous fossiliferous unit of Morocco
- Sannine Formation, contemporaneous fossiliferous formation of Lebanon
- Calcare di Bari, contemporaneous fossiliferous formation of Italy
