= Allahu Akbar (anthem) =

Egyptian pro-military patriotic song

English: God Is the Greatest
- الله أكبر
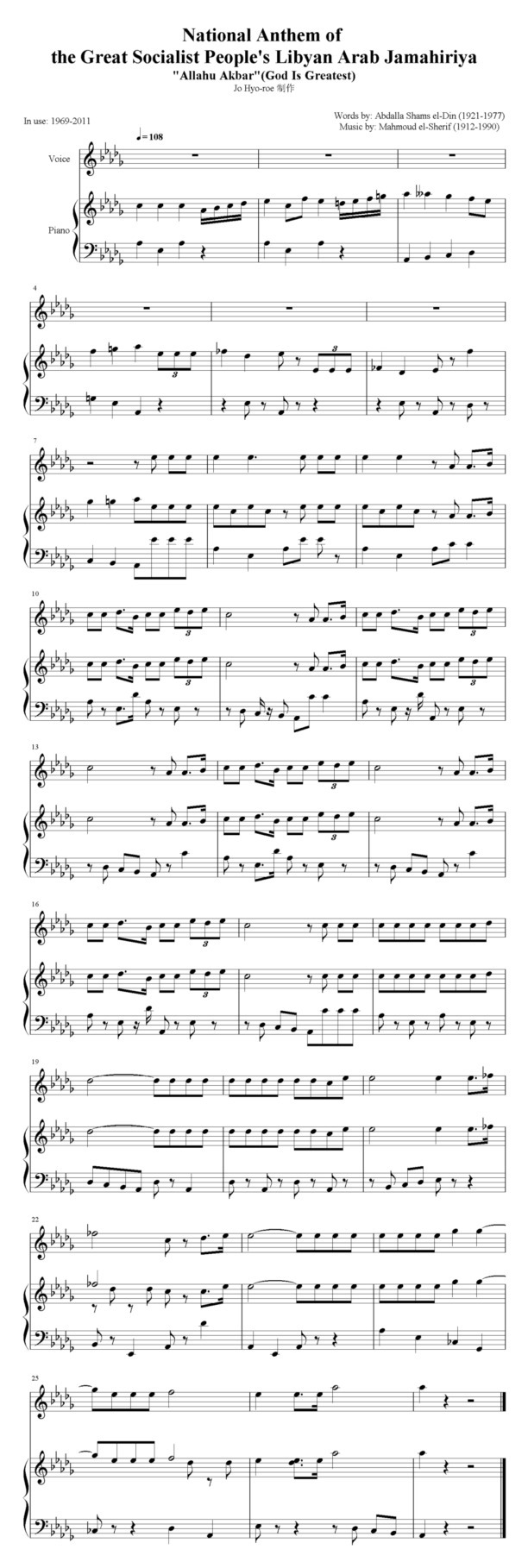
- Sheet music
- Former military anthem of the (Egypt) Egyptian Armed Forces; Former national anthem of Libya
- Lyrics: Mahmoud El-Sherif, 1955
- Music: Abdalla Shams El-Din, 1954
- Adopted: 1 September 1969
- Relinquished: 20 October 2011
- Preceded by: "Walla Zaman Ya Selahy" (Egypt)
- Succeeded by: "Libya, Libya, Libya" (Libya)

Audio sample
- Allahu Akbar: file; help

"Allahu Akbar" (Arabic: الله أكبر, lit. 'God Is the Greatest') is an Egyptian pro-military patriotic song composed by songwriter Abdalla Shams El-Din in 1954 and written by poet Mahmoud El-Sherif in 1955. It was first used by the Egyptian Armed Forces as a marching song during the Suez Crisis in 1956. The song was also used as the national anthem of Libya under Muammar Gaddafi from 1969 to 2011.

== History ==
=== Egyptian origins ===
"Allahu Akbar" was originally an Egyptian military marching song which became popular in Egypt and Syria during the Suez Crisis. The lyrics were written by Mahmoud El-Sherif, and the music was composed by Abdalla Shams El-Din. The song continues to be popular among the Arab world.

=== Use in Libya ===
"Allahu Akbar" was adopted as the official national anthem of the Libyan Arab Republic on 1 September 1969, by Libyan leader Muammar Gaddafi, showing his hopes of uniting the Arab world. "Allahu Akbar" replaced the previous national anthem "Libya, Libya, Libya", which had been used by the Kingdom of Libya since its independence in 1951.

When the Libyan Arab Republic became the Socialist People's Libyan Arab Jamahiriya on 2 March 1977, "Allahu Akbar" remained the national anthem of Libya. However, when Libya and Egypt broke off diplomatic relations following the latter's 1979 peace treaty with Israel, the Egyptian origins of the national anthem were no longer mentioned by official government sources.

In 2011, the National Transitional Council again adopted "Libya, Libya, Libya" as the national anthem of Libya, following the civil war and killing of Muammar Gaddafi. Gaddafi loyalists continued to use the anthem.

== Lyrics ==
Arabic
Transliteration
IPA transcription
English translation

اللهُ أَكْبَر اللهُ أَكْبَر
𝄇 اللهُ أَكْبَر فَوْقَ كَيْدِ الْمُعْتَدِي
وَاللهُ لِلْمَظْلُومِ خَيْر مُؤَيِّدِي 𝄆
أَنَا بِالْيَقِينِ وَبِالْسِّلَاحِ سَأَفْتَدِي
بَلَدِي وَنُورُ الْحَقِّ يَسْطَعُ فِي يَدِي
قُولُوا مَعِي قُولُوا مَعِي
الله الله اللهُ أَكْبَر
اللهُ فَوْقَ الْمُعْتَدِي

Allāhu ʾakbar! Allāhu ʾakbar!
𝄆 Allāhu ʾakbar fawqa kaydi l-muʿtadī
Wa-llāhu li-l-maẓlūmi xayr muʾayyidī 𝄇
ʾAnā bi-l-yaqīni wa-bi-s-silāḥi saʾaftadī
Baladī wa-nūru l-ḥaqqi yasṭaʿu fī yadī
Qūlū maʿī, qūlū maʿī
Allāh, Allāh, Allāhu ʾakbar!
Allāhu fawqa l-muʿtadī

[ɑlˁ.lˁɑː.hʊ ʔæk.bɑr | ɑlˁ.lˁɑː.hʊ ʔæk.bɑr]
𝄆 [ɑlˁ.lˁɑː.hʊ ʔæk.bɑr fɑw.qɑ kæj.dɪ‿l.mʊʕ.tæ.diː]
[wɑlˀ.lˀɑː.hʊ lɪl.mɑzˤ.luː.mɪ xɑjr mʊ.ʔæj.jɪ.diː] 𝄇
[ʔæ.næː bɪl.jæ.qiː.nɪ wɑ.bɪs.sɪ.læː.ħɪ sæ.ʔæf.tæ.diː]
[bæ.læ.diː wɑ.nuː.rʊ‿l.ħɑq.qɪ jæs.tˤɑ.ʕʊ fiː jæ.diː]
[quː.luː mæ.ʕiː | quː.luː mæ.ʕiː]
[ɑlˁ.lˁɑː.h ɑlˁ.lˁɑː.h ɑlˁ.lˁɑː.hʊ ʔæk.bɑr]
[ɑlˁ.lˁɑː.hʊ fɑw.qɑ‿l.mʊʕ.tæ.diː]

God is the greatest! God is the greatest!
𝄆 God is greatest above plots of the aggressors!
And God is the best helper of the oppressed! 𝄇
With faith and with weapons I shall defend my country,
And the light of truth will shine in my hand.
Say with me, say with me:
God, God, God is the greatest!
God is above any attacker!

اللهُ أَكْبَر اللهُ أَكْبَر
𝄇 يَا هٰذِهِ الْدُّنْيَا أَطِلِّي وَاسْمَعِي
جَيْشُ الْأَعَادِي جَاء يَبْغِي مَصْرَعِي 𝄆
بِالْحَقِّ سَوْفَ أُرْدُهُ وَبِمِدْفَعِي
وَإِذَا فَنَيْت فَسَوْفَ أُفْنِيهِ مَعِي
قُولُوا مَعِي قُولُوا مَعِي
الله الله اللهُ أَكْبَر
اللهُ فَوْقَ الْمُعْتَدِي

Allāhu ʾakbar! Allāhu ʾakbar!
𝄆 Yā hāḏihi d-dunyā ʾaṭillī wa-smaʿī
Jayšu l-ʾaʿādī jāʾ yabğī maṣraʿī 𝄇
Bi-l-ḥaqqi sawfa ʾurduhu wa-bi-midfaʿī
Wa-ʾiḏā fanayt fa-sawfa ʾufnīhi maʿī
Qūlū maʿī, qūlū maʿī
Allāh, Allāh, Allāhu ʾakbar!
Allāhu fawqa l-muʿtadī

[ɑlˁ.lˁɑː.hʊ ʔæk.bɑr | ɑlˁ.lˁɑː.hʊ ʔæk.bɑr]
𝄆 [jæː hæː.ðɪ.hɪ‿d.dʊn.jæː ʔæ.tˤɪl.liː wæs.mæ.ʕiː]
[d͡ʒæj.ʃʊ‿l.ʔæ.ʕɑː.diː d͡ʒæːʔ jæb.ɣiː mɑsˁ.rɑ.ʕiː] 𝄇
[bɪl.ħɑq.qɪ sɑw.fæ ʔʊr.dʊ.hʊ wɑ.bɪ.mɪd.fæ.ʕiː]
[wɑ.ʔɪ.ðæː fæ.næjt fæ.sɑw.fæ ʔʊf.niː.hɪ mæ.ʕiː]
[quː.luː mæ.ʕiː | quː.luː mæ.ʕiː]
[ɑlˁ.lˁɑː.h ɑlˁ.lˁɑː.h ɑlˁ.lˁɑː.hʊ ʔæk.bɑr]
[ɑlˁ.lˁɑː.hʊ fɑw.qɑ‿l.mʊʕ.tæ.diː]

God is the greatest! God is the greatest!
𝄆 Oh this world, watch and listen:
The enemy came coveting my demise, 𝄇
I shall fight with truth and defences,
And if I die, I'll take her with me!
Say with me, say with me:
God, God, God is the greatest!
God is above any attacker!

اللهُ أَكْبَر اللهُ أَكْبَر
𝄇 قُولُوا مَعِي اَلْوَيْلُ لِلْمُسْتَعْمِرِ
وَاللهُ فَوْقَ الْغَادِرِ الْمُتَكَبِّرِ 𝄆
اللهُ أَكْبَرُ يَا بِلَادِي كَبِّرِي
وَخُذِي بِنَاصِيَةِ الْمُغِيرِ وَدَمِّرِي
قُولُوا مَعِي قُولُوا مَعِي
الله الله اللهُ أَكْبَر
اللهُ فَوْقَ الْمُعْتَدِي

Allāhu ʾakbar! Allāhu ʾakbar!
𝄆 Qūlū maʿī: al-waylu li-l-mustaʿmiri
Wa-llāhu fawqa l-ğādiri l-mutakabbiri 𝄇
Allāhu ʾakbaru yā bilādī kabbirī
Wa-xuḏī bi-nāṣiyati l-muğīri wa-dammirī
Qūlū maʿī, qūlū maʿī
Allāh, Allāh, Allāhu ʾakbar!
Allāhu fawqa l-muʿtadī

[ɑlˁ.lˁɑː.hʊ ʔæk.bɑr | ɑlˁ.lˁɑː.hʊ ʔæk.bɑr]
𝄆 [quː.luː mæ.ʕiː | æl.wɑj.lʊ lɪl.mʊs.tɑʕ.mɪ.rɪ]
[wɑlˁ.lˁɑː.hʊ fɑw.qɑ‿l.ɣɑː.dɪ.rɪ‿l.mʊ.tæ.kæb.bɪ.rɪ] 𝄇
[ɑlˁ.lˁɑː.hʊ ʔæk.bɑ.rʊ jæː bɪ.læː.diː kæb.bɪ.riː]
[wɑ.xʊ.ðiː bɪ.næː.sˤɪ.jæ.tɪ‿l.mʊ.ɣiː.rɪ wæ.dæm.mɪ.riː]
[quː.luː mæ.ʕiː | quː.luː mæ.ʕiː]
[ɑlˁ.lˁɑː.h ɑlˁ.lˁɑː.h ɑlˁ.lˁɑː.hʊ ʔæk.bɑr]
[ɑlˁ.lˁɑː.hʊ fɑw.qɑ‿l.mʊʕ.tæ.diː]

God is the greatest! God is the greatest!
𝄆 Say with me, woe to the colonialists!
And God is above the invader egotist. 𝄇
God is the greatest, oh my country, say with me:
And behold of enemies forelock and destroy it.
Say with me, say with me:
God, God, God is the Greatest!
God is above any attacker!

اللهُ أَكْبَر
اللهُ أَكْبَر
اللهُ أَكْبَر
اللهُ أَكْبَر

Allāhu ʾakbar!
Allāhu ʾakbar!
Allāhu ʾakbar!
Allāhu ʾakbar!

[ɑlˁ.lˁɑː.hʊ ʔæk.bɑr]
[ɑlˁ.lˁɑː.hʊ ʔæk.bɑr]
[ɑlˁ.lˁɑː.hʊ ʔæk.bɑr]
[ɑlˁ.lˁɑː.hʊ ʔæk.bɑr]

God is the greatest!
God is the greatest!
God is the greatest!
God is the greatest!

== See also ==
- Takbir
- Suez Crisis
- Libyan Civil War
- Muammar Gaddafi
- Libya, Libya, Libya
