= Derna Governorate =

Governorate of Libya

Coordinates: 31°28′N 24°01′E

Darnah Governorate (Derna Governorate, Arabic: محافظة درنة) was one of the governorates (muhafazah) of Libya from 1963 to 1983. It was created out of the Cyrenaica province. Its capital was the town of Derna.

The governorate's population was 84,112 in 1964 and had risen to 108,407 by 1972.

- Bayda Governorate – west
- Benghazi Governorate – south
