= Cyrenaica province =

Traditional province of Libya

Cyrenaica برقة
- Region
- Cyrenaica as an administrative unit. It included all of eastern Libya from 1911 to 1963: Italian Cyrenaica from 1911 to 1937 and the Cyrenaica province until 1963.
- Coordinates: 31°00′N 22°30′E
- Country: Libya

Area
  - Total: 855,370 km^{2} (330,260 sq mi)

Population (2006)
  - Total: 1,613,749
  - Density: 1.8866/km^{2} (4.8863/sq mi)

Cyrenaica province is one of the three traditional Provinces of Libya. It was a formal province from 1934 until 1963, when it was subdivided into the Governorates of Libya. Its capital was the city of Benghazi. Between 1911 and 1934 it had been the separately governed colony of Italian Cyrenaica.

In 1963 the province was split into:

- Bayda Governorate
- Benghazi Governorate
- Darnah Governorate

== Self-declared federalism ==
Although a historical region, Cyrenaica has not had an official central government of its own for decades. Its individual provinces have reported directly to the central government in Tripoli.

On 20 July 2011, The First National Conference for Federalism offered proposals for ways to quickly achieve stability in the country after the fall of the Gaddafi government. Dr. Abubakr Mustafa Buera, head of the preparatory committee, was then elected first president for the National Federal Block, the first political group to call for federalism.

On 6 March 2012 Ahmed al-Senussi, a relative of King Idris, was appointed leader of the self-declared Cyrenaica Transitional Council, a meeting of tribal and military leaders. According to the council, Cyrenaica extended from the central coastal city of Sirte to the Egyptian border. In October 2013, "transitional" was dropped, and the council was renamed as "Council of Cyrenaica in Libya" (CCL). According to CCL, there would be further announcements relating to the organization of a local parliament and a Shura Council. Struggle for a federal system, to take place purely through legal means, was also emphasized.

On 2 November 2012, talks on the federal approach were on the verge of collapse after serious conflicts between the self-declared Cyrenaica Transitional Council (led by Ahmed al-Senussi) and the National Transitional Council; however, a new initiative by pro-Cyrenaican youth leaders resurrected the movement with a successful rally. Muheddine Mansury, Osama Buera and Salem Bujazia, the founders of the Movement for Federal Libya, organized numerous rallies and campaigns, in addition to distributing thousands of flags to remind the Cyrenaican people of their identity's symbol.

In a competing event, Abd-Rabbo al-Barassi was appointed head of the "Government of Cyrenaica" on 6 November 2013, supported by a local military leader, Ibrahim Jathran, who was also acting without the consent of the central government. Based on the appointed posts at the PBC, the government of al-Barassi planned to cover all functions except for foreign affairs and defense. On 11 November 2013, PBC announced formation of its own oil company, further straining relations with the Tripoli government.

The CCL stated that it had attempted to present a united front with Jadhran, but that he had proved inflexible and intent on pursuing his own agenda.

== Population ==
Cyrenaica's population growth over the years has been consistent with overall growth in Libya's population.

Year	Population	Percent of Libya's population
1954	291,236	27
1964	450,954	29
1973	661,351	29
1984	1,033,534	28
1995	1,261,331	26
2006	1,613,749	29

== Cities and towns of Cyrenaica ==
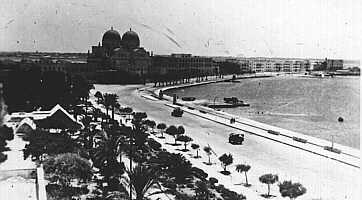
The city of Benghazi was traditionally the centre of Cyrenaica

- Benghazi
- Bayda
- Tobruk
- Derna
- Ajdabiya
- Marj
- Shahhat
- Jalu
