= Libya, Libya, Libya =

National anthem of Libya

ليبيا ليبيا ليبيا
English: Libya, Libya, Libya
- National anthem of Libya Former national anthem of Kingdom of Libya
- Also known as: "Ya Beladi" (English: "O my country!")
- Lyrics: Al Bashir Al Arebi
- Music: Mohammed Abdel Wahab, 1951
- Adopted: 24 December 1951 (instrumental only); 24 June 1955 (with lyrics)
- Readopted: 2011
- Relinquished: 1 September 1969
- Preceded by: "Allahu Akbar" (2011)
- Succeeded by: "Walla Zaman Ya Selahy" (1969)

Audio sample
- U.S. Navy Band instrumental version (chorus and one verse) in A-flat major: file; help

"Libya, Libya, Libya" (Arabic: ليبيا ليبيا ليبيا, romanized: Lībiyā, Lībiyā, Lībiyā), also known as "O My Country" (Arabic: يا بلادي, romanized: Yā Bilādī), has been the national anthem of Libya since 2011; it was previously the national anthem of the Kingdom of Libya from 1955 to 1969. It was composed by Mohammed Abdel Wahab, in 1951, with the lyrics being written by Al Bashir Al Arebi.

== History ==
=== Kingdom of Libya ===
"Libya, Libya, Libya" was composed by Mohammed Abdel Wahab in 1951 and was originally the national anthem of the Kingdom of Libya, from its independence in 1951 until 1969 when King Idris I was overthrown by a coup d'état led by Muammar Gaddafi. The lyrics were written by Al Bashir Al Arebi.

=== Libyan Arab Republic and the Great Socialist People's Libyan Arab Jamahiriya ===
In 1969, Muammar Gaddafi adopted the Egyptian anthem "Wallāh Zamān, Yā Silāḥī" as the national anthem of the newly proclaimed Libyan Arab Republic. It was later changed to the Egyptian military marching song "Allahu Akbar", which remained the anthem of republic, and later, the Great Socialist People's Libyan Arab Jamahiriya, until 2011.

=== Libyan civil war ===
In 2011, "Libya, Libya, Libya" was declared as the new national anthem of Libya by the National Transitional Council. "Libya, Libya, Libya" ultimately did become the national anthem of Libya once again, following the Libyan Civil War and the death of Muammar Gaddafi. The verse that glorifies King Idris has since been discontinued and rewritten to glorify Libyan national hero Omar al-Mukhtar, who spearheaded native Libyan resistance against Italian colonization during the Second Italo-Senussi War.

== Lyrics ==
=== Current lyrics ===
The rewritten third verse is not always sung.

Arabic original

كُورَال:
يَا بِلَادِي يَا بِلَادِي
بِجِهَادِي وَجِلَادِي
اِدْفَعِي كَيْد اَلْأَعَادِي وَالْعَوَادِي
وَاسْلَمِي اِسْلَمِي اِسْلَمِي
اِسْلَمِي طُولَ الْمَدَى
إِنَّنَا نَحْنُ الْفِدَاء
لِيبِيَا لِيبِيَا لِيبِيَا

١
يَا بِلَادِي أَنْتِ مِيرَاثُ الْجُدُودْ
لَا رَعَى اللهُ يَدًا تَمْتَدُّ لَكْ
فَاسْلَمِي إِنَّا عَلَى الدَّهْرِ جُنُودْ
لَا نُبَالِي إِنْ سَلِمْتِ مَنْ هَلَكْ
وَخُذِي مِنَّا وَثِيقَاتِ الْعُهُودْ
إِنَّنَا يَا لِيبِيَا لَنْ نَخْذِلَكْ
لَنْ نَعُودْ لِلْقُيُودْ
قَدْ تَحَرَّرْنَا وَحَرَّرْنَا الْوَطَنْ
لِيبِيَا لِيبِيَا لِيبِيَا

كُورَال

٢
جُرُّدَ الْأَجْدَادُ عَزْمًا مُرْهَفَا
يَوْمَ نَادَاهُمْ مُنَادٍ لِلْكِفَاحْ
ثُمَّ سَارُوا يَحْمِلُونَ الْمُصْحَفَا
بِالْيَدِ الْأُولَىٰ وَبِالْأُخْرَى السِّلَاحْ
فَإِذَا فِي الْكَوْنِ دِينٌ وَصَفَا
وَإِذَا الْعَالَمُ خَيْرٌ وَصَلَاحْ
فَالْخُلُودْ لِلْجُدُودْ
إِنَّهُمْ قَدْ شَرَّفُواْ هٰذَا الْوَطَنْ
لِيبِيَا لِيبِيَا لِيبِيَا

كُورَال

٣
حَيِّ الْمُخْتَارْ أَمِيرَ اَلْفَاتِحِينْ
إِنَّهُ فِي لِيبِيَا رَمْزُ الْجِهَادْ
حَمَلَ الْرَّايَةَ فِينَا بِالْيَمِينْ
وَتَبَعْنَاهُ لِتَحْرِيرِ الْبِلَادْ
فَانْثَنَىٰ بِالْمَجْدِ وَالْفَتْحِ الْمُبِينْ
وَرَكَزْنَا فَوْقَ هَامَاتِ الْنِّجَادْ
رَايَةً حُرَّةً
ظَلَّلَتْ بِالْعَزِّ أَرْجَاءَ الْوَطَنْ
لِيبِيَا لِيبِيَا لِيبِيَا

كُورَال

٤
يَا ابْنَ لِيبْيَا يَا ابْنَ آسَادَ الْشَّرَى
إِنَّنَا لِلْمَجْدِ وَالْمَجْدُ لَنَا
مُذْ سَرَوْنَا حَمِدَ الْقَوْمُ الْسُّرَى
بَارَكَ اللهُ لَنَا اِسْتِقْلَالَنَا (Note: Sometimes written بَارَكَ اللهُ لَنَا اِنْتِصَارَنَا, Bāraka l-Lāhu lanā intiṣāranā [bɑː.rɑ.kɑ‿ɫ.ɫɑː.hʊ læ.næː‿(ɪ)n.tɪ.sˤɑː.rɑ.næː] ("May Allah bless our victory"), as an additional 2011 update from the original 1951 version.)
فَابْتَغُوا الْعَلْيَاءَ شَأْوًا فِي الْوَرَى
وَاسْتَعِدُّواْ لِلْوَغَى أَشْبَالَنَا
لِلْغِلَابْ يَا شَبَابْ
إِنَّمَا الدُّنْيَا كِفَاحٌ لِلْوَطَنْ
لِيبِيَا لِيبِيَا لِيبِيَا

Transliteration

Kūrāl:
Yā bilādī yā bilādī
Bi-jihādī wa-jiladī
Idfaʿī kayd al-ʾaʿādī wa-l-ʿawādī
Wa-slamī islamī islamī
Islamī ṭūla l-madā
Innanā naḥnu l-fidāʾ
Lībiyā Lībiyā Lībiyā

I
Yā bilādī ʾanti mīrāṯu l-judūd
La raʿā l-Lāhu yadān tamtaddu lak
Fa-slamī innā ʿalā d-dahri junūd
Lā nubālī in salimti man halak
Wa-xuḏī minnā waṯīqāti l-ʿuhūd
Innanā yā Lībiyā lan naxḏilak
Lan naʿūd li-l-quyūd
Qad taḥarrarnā wa-ḥarrarnā l-waṭan
Lībiyā Lībiyā Lībiyā

Kūrāl

II
Jurruda l-ʾajdādu ʿazmān murhafā
Yawma nādāhum munādin li-l-kifāḥ
Ṯumma sārū yaḥmilūna l-muṣḥafā
Bi-l-yadi l-ʾūlā wa-bi-l-ʾuxrā s-silaḥ
Fa-ʾiḏā fī l-kawni dīnun wa-ṣafā
Wa-ʾiḏā l-ʿālamu xayrun wa-ṣalaḥ
Fa-l-xulūd li-l-judūd
Innahum qad šarrafū hāḏā l-waṭan
Lībiyā Lībiyā Lībiyā

Kūrāl

III
Ḥayyi l-Muxtār ʾamīra l-fātiḥīn
Innahu fī Lībiyā ramzu l-jihād
Ḥamala r-rāyata fīnā bi-l-yamīn
Watabaʿnāhu li-taḥrīri l-bilād
Fa-nṯanā bi-l-majdi wa-l-fatḥi l-mubīn
Wa-rakaznā fawqa hāmāti n-nijād
Rāyatan ḥurratan
Ẓallalat bi-l-ʿazi ʾarjāʾa l-waṭan
Lībiyā Lībiyā Lībiyā

Kūrāl

IV
Yā bna Lībyā yā bna āsāda š-šarā
Innanā li-l-majdi wa-l-majdu lanā
Muḏ sarawnā ḥamida l-qawmu s-surā
Bāraka l-Lāhu lanā istiqlālanā
Fa-btağū l-ʿalyāʾa šāʾwan fī l-warā
Wa-staʿiddū li-l-wağā ʾašbālanā
Li-l-ğilab yā šabāb
Innamā d-dunyā kifāḥun li-l-waṭan
Lībiyā Lībiyā Lībiyā

IPA transcription (Note: See Help:IPA/Arabic and Libyan Arabic.)

[kuː.rɑːl]
[jæ bi.læː.diː jæ bi.læː.diː]
[bi.ʒi.hæː.diː wæ.ʒi.læ.diː]
[ɪd.fæ.ʕiː kæjd æl.ɑ.ʕæː.diː wæl.ʕɑ.wæː.diː]
[wæs.læ.miː ɪs.læ.miː ɪs.læ.miː]
[ɪs.læ.miː tˤuː.læ‿l.mæ.dæː]
[ɪn.næ.næː næħ.nʊ‿l.fi.dæːʔ]
[liː.bi.jæː liː.bi.jæː liː.bi.jæː]

1
[jæ bi.læː.diː ʔæn.ti miː.rɑː.θʊ‿l.ʒu.duːd]
[læ rɑ.ʕɑ‿ɫ.ɫɑː.hu jæ.dæːn tæm.tæd.dʊ læk]
[fæs.læ.miː ɪn.næ ʕɑ.læ‿d.dæh.ri ʒu.nuːd]
[læː nu.bæː.liː ɪn sæ.lɪm.ti mæn hæ.læk]
[wɑ.χu.ðiː min.næː wæ.θiː.qɑː.tɪ‿l.ʕʊ.huːd]
[ɪn.næ.næː jæ liː.bi.jæː læn næχ.ði.læk]
[læn nɑ.ʕuːd lɪl.qʊ.juːd]
[qɑd tæ.ħɑr.rɑr.næː wæ.ħɑr.rɑr.næː‿l.wɑ.tˤɑn]
[liː.bi.jæː liː.bi.jæː liː.bi.jæː]

[kuː.rɑːl]

2
[ʒʊr.rʊdæ‿l.ʔæʒ.dæː.dʊ ʕɑz.mæːn mur.hæ.fæː]
[yæw.mæ næː.dæː.hum mu.næː.dɪn lɪl.ki.fæːħ]
[θʊm.mæ sɑː.rʊː yɑħ.mɪ.luː.næ‿l.mʊsˤ.ħɑ.fæː]
[bɪl.jæ.dɪ‿l.ʔu.læː wæ.bɪl.ʊχ.rɑ‿s.si.læħ]
[fæ.ʔi.ðæː fiː‿l.kæw.ni diː.nʊn wɑ.sˤɑ.fæː]
[wæ.ʔi.ðæː‿l.ʕɑː.læ.mʊ χɑj.rʊn wɑ.sˤɑ.læħ]
[fæl.χʊ.lʊːd lɪl.ʒʊ.dʊːd]
[ɪn.næ.hum qɑd ʃɑr.rɑ.fuː hæː.ðæː‿l.wɑ.tˤɑn]
[liː.bi.jæː liː.bi.jæː liː.bi.jæː]

[kuː.rɑːl]

3
[hæj.jɪ‿l.mʊχ.tɑːr ʔæ.miː.ræ‿l.fæː.tɪ.ħiːn]
[ɪn.næ.hu fiː liː.bi.jæː rɑm.zʊ‿l.ʒi.hæːd]
[ħɑ.mæ.læ‿r.rɑː.jæ.tæ fiː.næː bɪl.jæ.miːn]
[wæ.tæ.bæʕ(ɑ).næː.hu lɪ.tɑħ.riː.rɪ‿l.bi.læːd]
[fæn.θæ.næː bɪl.mæʒ.di wæl.fæt.ħɪ‿l.mʊ.biːn]
[wæ.rɑ.kæz.næː fɑw.qɑ hæː.mæː.tɪ‿n.ni.ʒæːd]
[rɑː.jæ.tæn hʊr.rɑ.tæn]
[ðˤɑɫ.ɫɑ.læt bɪl.ʕæ.zɪ ʔɑr.ʒæː.ʔæ‿l.wɑ.tˤɑn]
[liː.bi.jæː liː.bi.jæː liː.bi.jæː]

[kuː.rɑːl]

4
[jæː‿b.næ liː.b(ɪ).jæː jæː‿b.næ æː.sæː.dæ‿ʃ.ʃɑ.rɑː]
[ɪn.næ.næː lɪl.mæʒ.di wæl.mæʒ.du læ.næː]
[mʊð sɑ.rɑw.næː ħæ.mi.dæ‿l.qɑw.mu‿s.su.rɑː]
[bɑː.rɑ.kɑ‿ɫ.ɫɑː.hʊ læ.næː‿ɪs.tɪq.læː.læ.næː]
[fæb.tæ.ʁʊː‿l.ʕɑl.jæː.ʔæ ʃæːʔ.wɑn fiː‿l.wɑ.rɑː]
[wæs.tæ.ʕɪd.dʊː lɪl.wɑ.ʁɑː ʔæʃ.bæː.læ.næː]
[lɪl.ʁɪ.læb jæː ʃæ.bæːb]
[ɪn.næ.mæː‿d.dʊn.jæː ki.fæː.ħʊn lɪl.wɑ.tˤɑn]
[liː.bi.jæː liː.bi.jæː liː.bi.jæː]

English translation

Chorus:
O my country, o my country,
With my struggle and gladiatorial patience,
Drive off all enemies plots and mishaps
And be saved, be saved, be saved
Be saved all the way
We are your sacrifices
Libya, Libya, Libya!

I
O my country, Thou art the heritage of my ancestors
May Allah not bless any hand that tries to harm Thee
Be saved, we are for ever Thy soldiers
No matter the death toll if Thou art saved
Take from us the most credential oaths
We won't let Thee down, Libya
We will never be enchained again
We are free and have freed our homeland
Libya, Libya, Libya!

Chorus

II
Our grandfathers stripped a fine determination
When the call for struggle was made
They marched carrying a Qur'an in one hand,
and their weapons in the other hand
The universe is then full of faith and purity
The world is then a place of goodness and godliness
Eternity is for our grandfathers
They have honoured this homeland
Libya, Libya, Libya!

Chorus

III
Hail al-Mukhtar, the prince of conquerors
He is the symbol of struggle and jihad
He raises our flag high
And we follow him, freeing our homeland,
He was praised with glory and conquest manifest
And raises hope for Libya in heaven,
A free flag
Over a rich country,
Libya, Libya, Libya.

Chorus

IV
O son of Libya; O son of lions of the wild
We're for honour and the honours are for us
Since we began struggling, people all over praised
May Allah bless our independence
So seek height as a quality in mankind
Our cubs, be prepared for the foreseen battles
Our youths, to prevail
Life is only a struggle for our homeland
Libya, Libya, Libya!

=== Original third verse (1951–1969) ===
Arabic original

٣
حَيِّ إِدْرِيسَ سَلِيلُ الْفَاتِحِينْ
إِنَّهُ فِي لِيبِيَا رَمْزُ الْجِهَادْ
حَمَلَ الْرَّايَةَ فِينَا بِالْيَمِينْ
وَتَبَعْنَاهُ لِتَحْرِيرِ الْبِلَادْ
فَانْثَنَى بِالْمُلْكِ وَالْفَتْحِ الْمُبِينْ
وَرَكَزْنَا فَوْقَ هَامَاتِ الْنِّجَادْ
رَايَةً حُرَّةً
ظَلَّلَتْ بِالْعَزِّ أَرْجَاءَ الْوَطَنْ
لِيبِيَا لِيبِيَا لِيبِيَا

Transliteration

III
Ḥayyi ʾIdrīsa salilu l-fātiḥīn
Innahu fī Lībiyā ramzu l-jihād
Ḥamala r-rāyata fīnā bi-l-yamīn
Watabaʿnāhu li-taḥrīri l-bilād
Fa-nṯanā bi-l-mulki wa-l-fatḥi l-mubīn
Wa-rakaznā fawqa hāmāti n-nijād
Rāyatan ḥurratan
Ẓallalat bi-l-ʿazi ʾarjāʾa l-waṭan
Lībiyā Lībiyā Lībiyā

IPA transcription

3
[hæj.jɪ ʔɪd.rɪː.sæ sæ.lɪ.lʊ‿l.fæː.tɪ.ħiːn]
[ɪn.næ.hu fiː liː.bi.jæː rɑm.zʊ‿l.ʒi.hæːd]
[ħɑ.mæ.læ‿r.rɑː.jæ.tæ fiː.næː bɪl.jæ.miːn]
[wæ.tæ.bæʕ(ɑ).næː.hu lɪ.tɑħ.riː.rɪ‿l.bɪ.læːd]
[fæn.θæ.næː bɪl.mʊl.kɪ wæl.fæt.ħɪ‿l.mʊ.biːn]
[wæ.rɑ.kæz.næː fɑw.qɑ hæː.mæː.tɪ‿n.nɪ.ʒæːd]
[rɑː.jæ.tæn hʊr.rɑ.tæn]
[ðˤɑɫ.ɫɑ.læt bɪl.ʕæ.zɪ ʔɑr.ʒæː.ʔæ‿l.wɑ.tˤɑn]
[liː.bi.jæː liː.bi.jæː liː.bi.jæː]

English translation

III
Hail Idris, the descendant of conquerors
He is the symbol of struggle and jihad
He raises our flag high
And we follow him, freeing our homeland,
He allows praise of his ancestors
And raises hope for Libya in heaven,
A free flag
Over a rich country,
Libya, Libya, Libya.

== See also ==
- Music of Libya
