= Az Zawiyah Governorate =

Governorate of Libya

Coordinates: 32°34′00″N 12°10′30″E

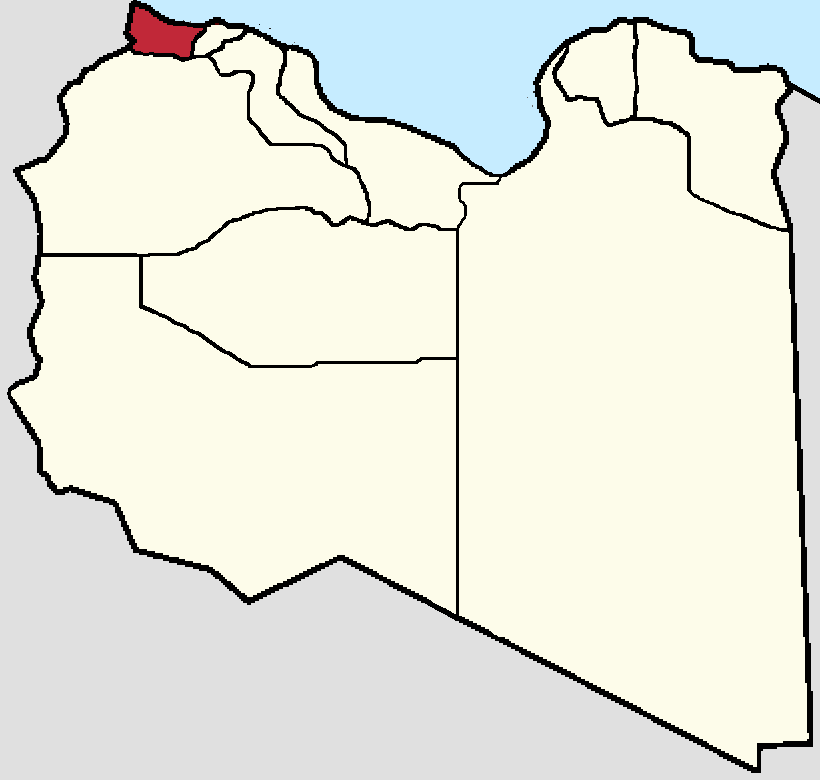
Location of Az Zawiyah Governorate (1963-1973) within Libya

Az Zawiyah Governorate was one of the governorates (muhafazah) of Libya from 1963 to 1983. Its capital was Zawiya. It was established from the northwestern part of Tripolitania province.

The governorate's population was 190,708 in 1964 and had increased to 231,242 by 1972.
