= Dawada =

The Dawada (Duwwud, Dawwada) are an Afro-Arab ethnic group from the Fezzan region of southern Libya. They live around the Gabraoun oasis, at the town of Murzuk, where they harvest natron and Artemia salina (brine shrimp) in the salty lakes. They dry the brine shrimp, crush them, make into cakes, sometimes mixed with dates, and sell them to caravans. This is because the brine shrimp is regarded as an aphrodisiac in the Fezzan. The name Dawada means "worm-folk" in Arabic due to this practice. The Tuareg visited them occasionally to trade cigarettes and oil in exchange for the shrimps.

The appearance of the Dawada is distinctive and has been linked to a relict population. They are mostly an endogamous group who rarely marry outside of their tribe. They speak an Arabic dialect. They called themselves "the Forgotten of God". They did not navigate water. They built houses and mosques with only palm fronds and blocks of natron. They plaited ropes but did not weave, sew, or knit. They had no clay and made no pots. They had no wheels. The women harvested shrimps by dredging the shallows with rope bags on poles.
