= Tripolitania (province of Libya) =

Traditional province of Libya

Tripolitania طرابلس (Arabic) Ṭarābulus (Arabic) Τριπολιτάνια (Ancient Greek) Ṭrables (Nafusi)
- Tripolitania as a subdivision of Libya 1934–1963.
- Capital: Tripoli

Area
  - Total: 353,000 km^{2} (136,000 sq mi)

Population (2006) (Note: 2006 census, based on the sum of population of districts Misrata, Murqub, Tripoli, Jafara, Zawiya, Nuqat al Khams, Jabal al Gharbi, Nalut.)
  - Total: 3,601,853
  - Density: 10.2/km^{2} (26.4/sq mi)

Tripolitania province is one of the three traditional Provinces of Libya. It was a formal province from 1934 until 1963, when it was subdivided into the Governorates of Libya. Its capital was the city of Tripoli. Between 1911 and 1934 it had been the separately governed colony of Italian Tripolitania.

In 1963 the province was split into:

- Al Khums Governorate
- Az Zawiyah Governorate
- Gharian Governorate
- Misrata Governorate
- Tarabulus Governorate

== Demographics ==
=== Population ===
Tripolitania is Libya's most populous region (compared to Fezzan and Cyrenaica). Tripolitania's population has grown throughout years, as has the population of Libya as a whole. Libya's overall population, however, has grown at a rate slightly greater. Because of this, the percentage of Libya's population living within Tripolitania has decreased.

Year	Population	Percent of Libya's population
1954	738,338	67.8
1964	1,034,089	66.1
1973	1,459,874	64.9
1984	2,390,039	65.7
1995	3,185,458	66.4
2006	3,601,853	63.3

Source: Gathered from bulletins of censuses 1964, 1973, 1995 and 2006.

=== Ethnicity ===
The majority of the population in Tripolitania is of Arab ancestry. Communities of Berber-speakers lives in the Jebel Nafusa region, the town of Zuwara on the coast and the city-oases of Ghadames.

=== Administration ===
The system of administrative divisions that included Tripolitania was abolished in the early 1970s in favor of a system of smaller-size municipalities or baladiyat (singular baladiyah). The baladiyat system was subsequently changed many times and has lately become the "Sha'biyat" system. The region that was Tripolitania is now composed of several smaller baladiyat or sha'biyat.
