= Homs Governorate (Libya) =

Governorate of Libya

Coordinates: 31°10′N 14°30′E

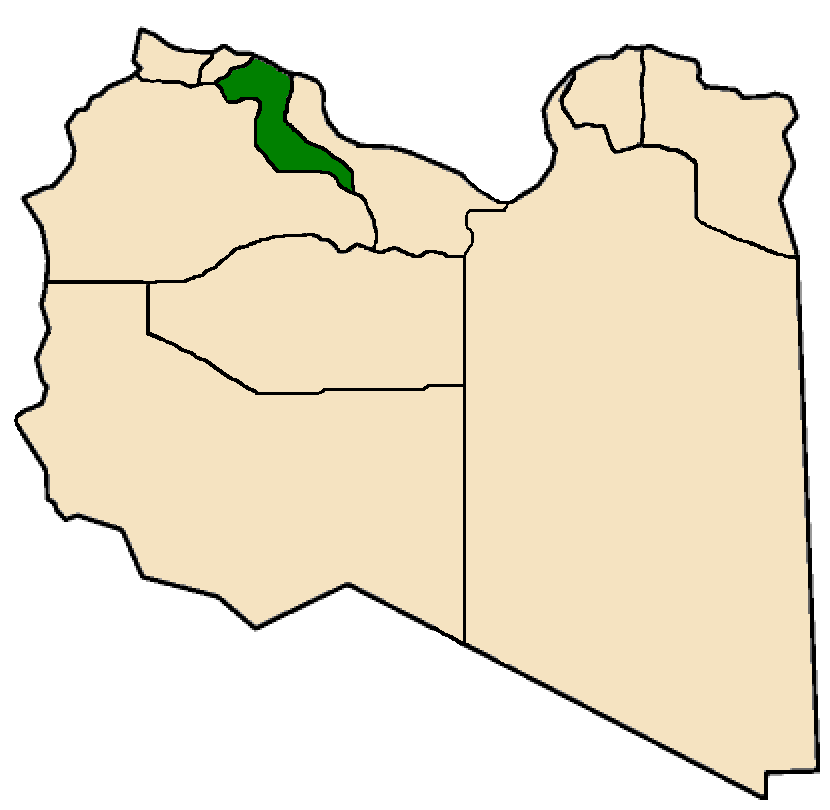
Location of Homs Governorate (1963–1983) within Libya

Al Khums Governorate or Homs Governorate (Arabic: الخمس محافظة) was one of the governorates (muhafazah) of Libya from 1963 to 1983. Its capital was the town of Khoms. It was created out of the Tripolitania province.

The governorate's population was 136,679 in 1964 and had risen to 184,079 by 1972.
