= Royal Palace of Tripoli =

Residence of the Libyan monarch

Coordinates: 32°53′16″N 13°11′21″E

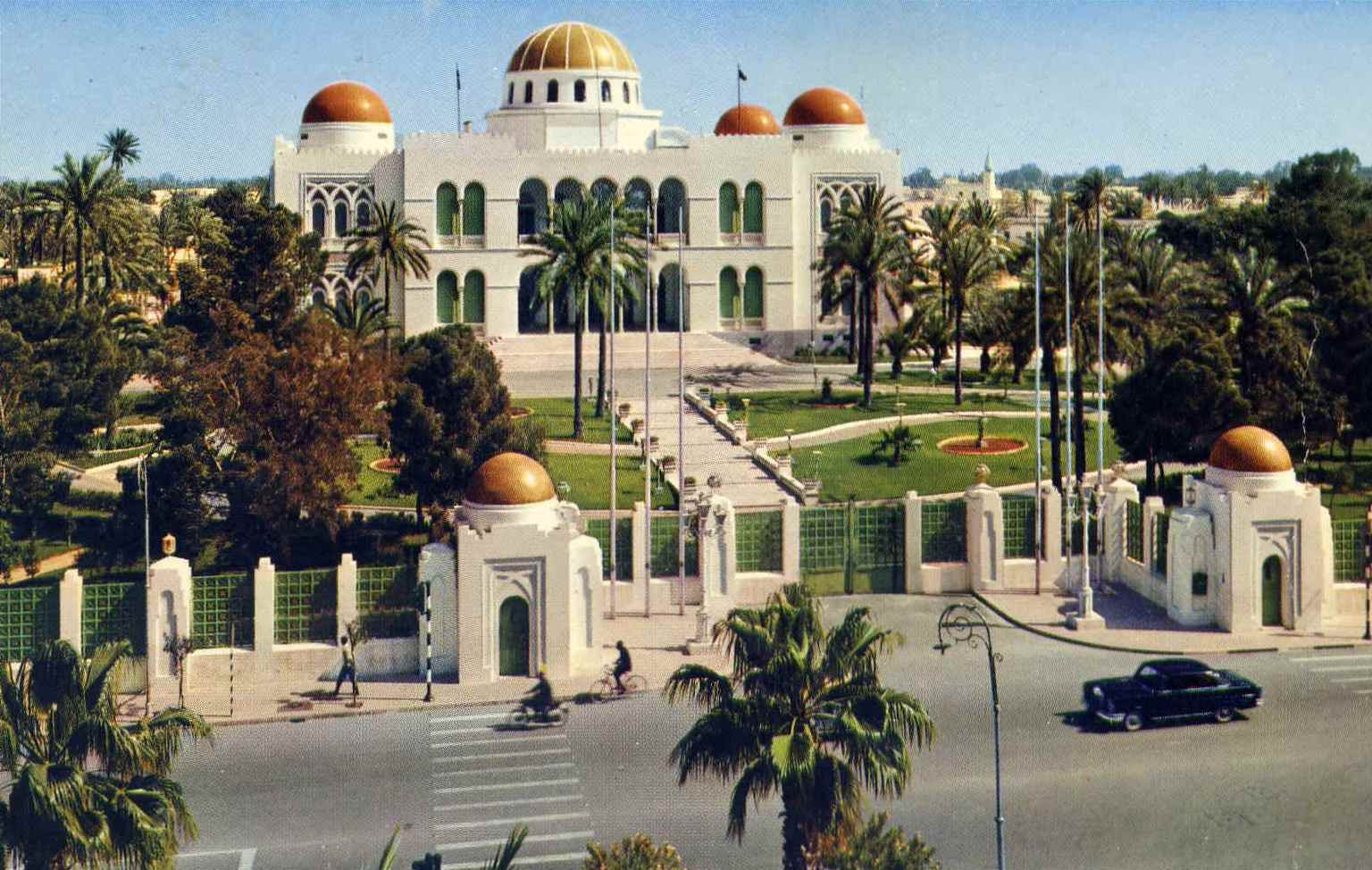
The Royal Palace of Tripoli

The Royal Palace (Arabic: قصر الخلد) was the residence of the Libyan monarch in the capital city, Tripoli. It was built during the Italian rule between 1924 and 1931 by architect Saul Meraviglia Mantegazza for the colonial governors of Italian Tripolitania.

Another residence was the Al-Manar Palace in Benghazi, which was donated by King Idris of Libya as the first campus of the University of Libya. Another residence at Bab Zaytun was further to the east in Tobruk.

It was converted into a public library after the coup d'état Colonel Muammar Gaddafi. It reopened to the public as a museum in December 2025 after 14 years, in the wake of Killing of Muammar Gaddafi.
