= Bayda Governorate =

Governorate of Libya

Coordinates: 30.7667°N 21.7333°E

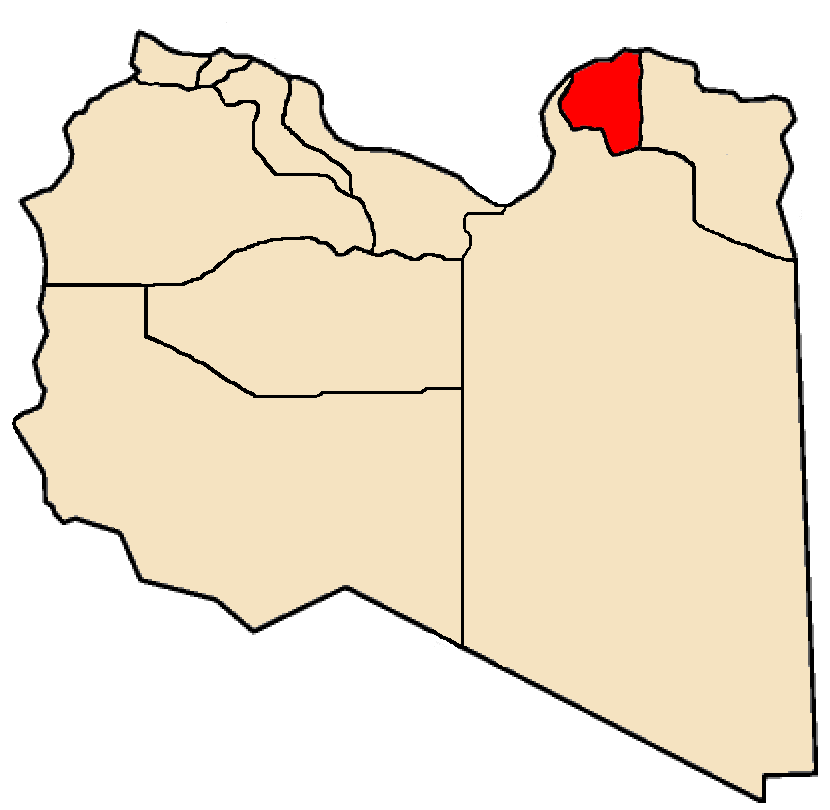
Location of Bayda Governorate (1963-1983) within Libya

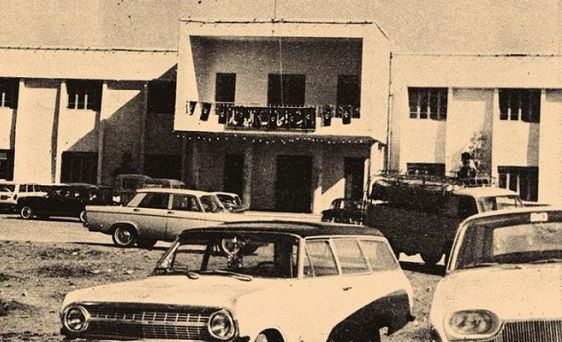
Bayda Governorate at 1966

Bayda Governorate (Bayda Governorate, Arabic: محافظة البيضاء) was one of the governorates (muhafazah) of Libya from 1963 to 1969. Its capital was Bayda.Other important towns in the governorate were Marj, Al Qubah, Shahhat and Apollonia. It was created out of the Cyrenaica province.

On 23 May 1971, the governorate was renamed Jabal al Akhdar Governorate, but the boundaries remained unchanged. The governorate's population was 131,940 in 1963.

- Darnah Governorate - east
- Benghazi Governorate - west

== See also ==
- Jabal al Akhdar District
