= Ludovico Barassi =

Ludovico Barassi (1873 – 1956) was an Italian jurist and one of Italy's leading authorities on civil law in the first half of the 20th century.

After studies in Pavia and Berlin, he assumed a professorship in Perugia in 1900 and later in Genoa, which he left for Pavia in 1917 and finally Milan's Università Cattolica del Sacro Cuore in 1924.

His principal works include the civil law textbook Istituzioni di diritto civile (1924), used by generations of Italian students, and Il contratto di lavoro nel diritto civile italiano (1901), which established the scientific discipline of labour law in Italy.

== Biography ==
He taught at the University of Perugia, University of Genoa and Bari. He later worked at the Università Cattolica del Sacro Cuore Heart in Milan, where he was full professor of civil law and in charge of labor law from 1928 to 1942.

He introduced the idea that Wage labour were applicable to subordinate employment and that this should be identified by hetero-direction on the part of the Employment as opposed to the organization of work by the worker himself characteristic of Self-employment.

Among Barassi's contributions to civil law, we can mention, by way of example only, the subsumption of rights to intellectual works within the scheme of property rights.

== Bibliography ==
- Vano, Christina (2001). "Ludovico Barassi". In Michael Stolleis (ed.). Juristen: ein biographisches Lexikon; von der Antike bis zum 20. Jahrhundert (in German) (2nd ed.). München: Beck. p. 60. ISBN 3-406-45957-9.
