= Awbari Governorate =

Governorate of Libya

Coordinates: 25°12′N 13°14′E

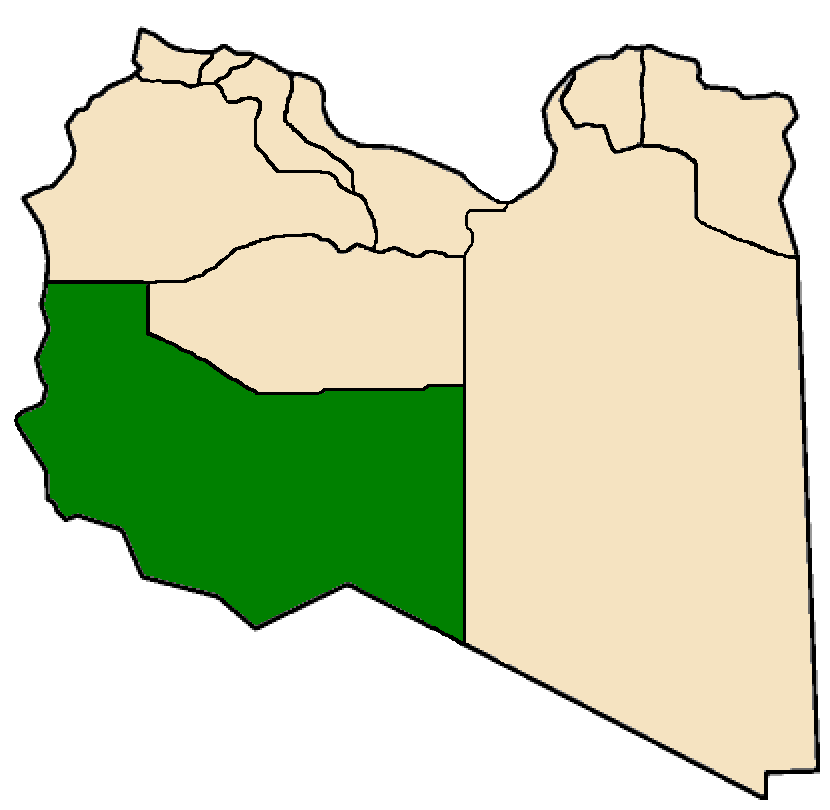
Location of Awbari Governorate (1963-1973) within Libya

Awbari Governorate or Ubari Governorate Arabic: أوباري محافظة was one of the governorates (muhafazah) of Libya from 1963 to 1973. Its capital was the town of Ubari. It was created out of the southwestern part of Fezzan province. In 1973 the Awbari Governorate was merged into an altered Sabha Governorate.

The governorate's population was 31,890 in 1964.
