= Abd-Rabbo al-Barassi =

Libyan politician

Abd-Rabbo al-Barassi (Arabic: عبد ربّه البرعصي) is the self-declared head of the government of Barqa, the eastern half of Libya. Promoting a federalist agenda, he was appointed on 3 November 2013 in a meeting at Ajdabiya. The central government of Libya, located in Tripoli, does not recognize his authority or Barqa's autonomy.
