= Tarabulus Governorate =

Governorate of Libya

Coordinates: 32°31′N 12°54′E

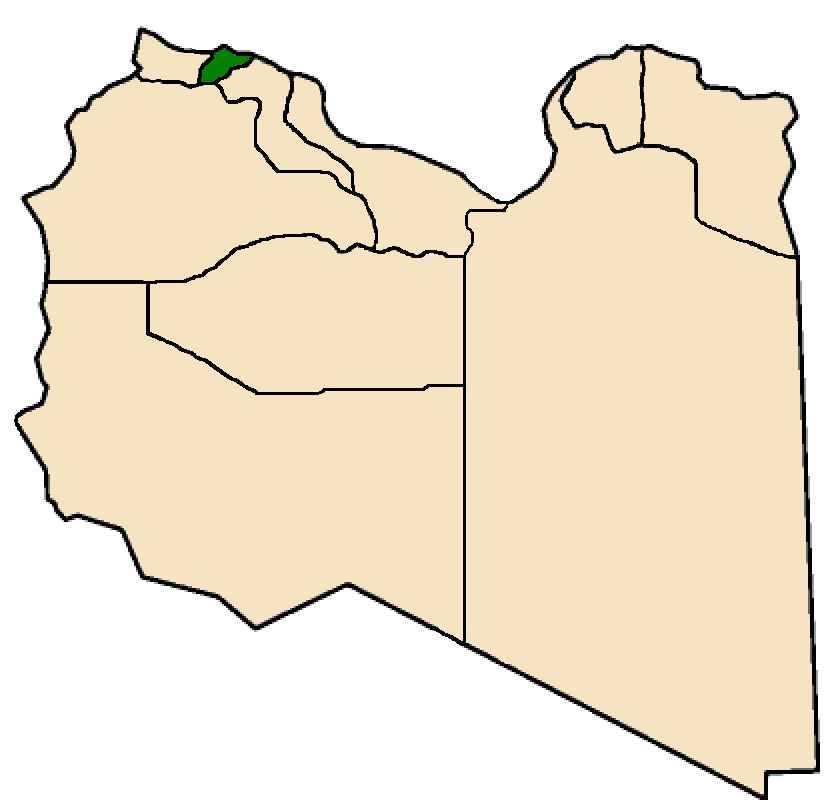
Location of Tarabulus Governorate (1963–1983) within Libya

Tarabulus Governorate or Tripoli Governorate was one of the governorates (muhafazah) of Libya from 1963 to 1983. It contained the city of Tripoli, which was also its administrative capital. Tarabulus is the Arabic name for Tripoli, and was sometimes applied to the entire Tripolitania province.

The governorate's population was 379,925 in 1964 and had risen to 544,842 by 1972. Although Tarabulus Governorate constituted less than 1% of the land area in Libya, more than 25% of the population lived there, with a density about five times greater than the mean of the other governorates.

== See also ==
- Tarabulus
