= Jabal al Gharbi Governorate =

Governorate of Libya

Coordinates: 28°13′30″N 13°01′00″E

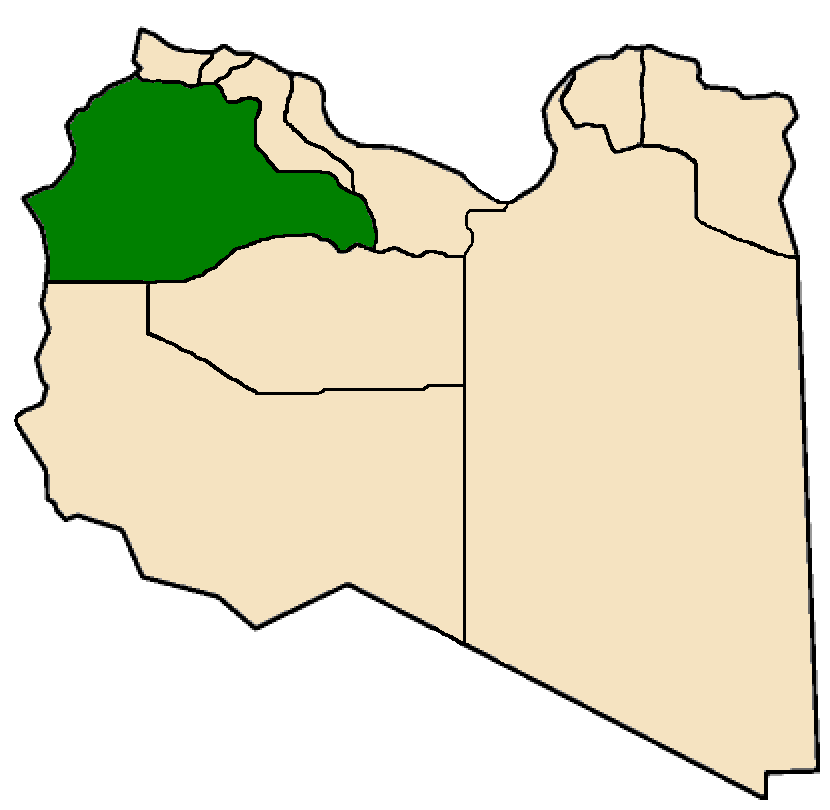
Location of Al Jebal al Gharbi Governorate (1963-1983) within Libya

Jabal al Gharbi Governorate or Jebal al Gharbi Governorate was one of the governorates (muhafazah) of Libya from 1963 to 1983. Its capital was Gharian. Other important towns in the governorate were Yafran, Nalut, Ghadames and Mizda. It was created out of the southwestern part of Tripolitania province.

In 1970 the governorate was renamed Gharyan Governorate, but the boundaries remained unchanged.

In 1972 the governorate had 5 districts named after the main towns: Gharyan, Yafran, Nalut, Ghadames and Mizda.

The governorate's population was 180,883 in 1964 and had risen to 245,018 by 1972.
