= Misrata Governorate =

Governorate of Libya

Coordinates: 30°27′N 17°05′E

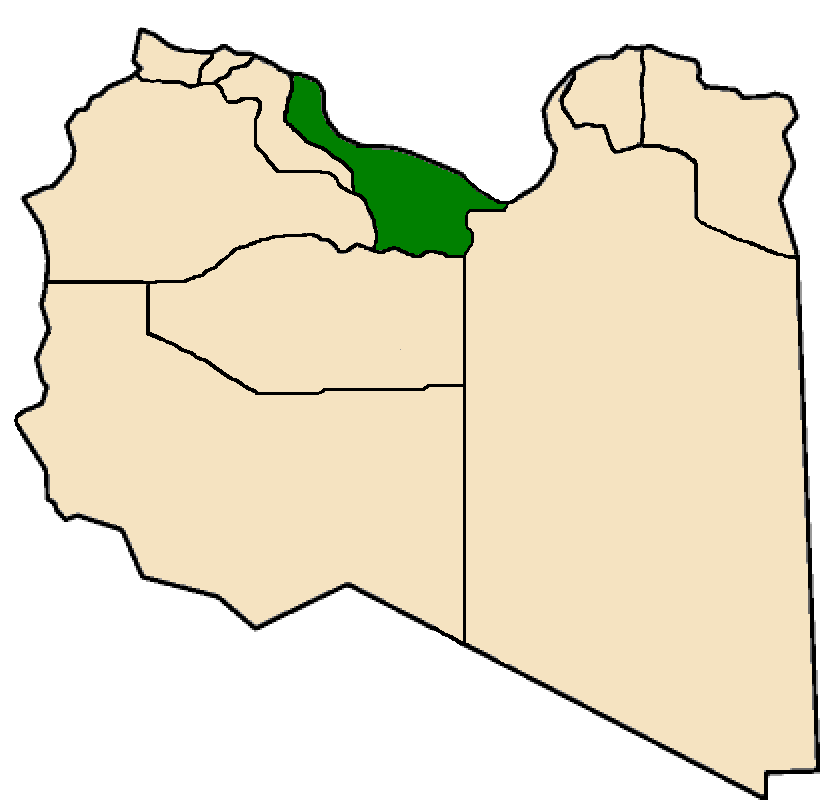
Location of Misrata Governorate (1963-1983) within Libya

Misrata Governorate (or Misurata Province before WW2) was one of the governorates (muhafazah) of Libya from 1963 to 1983. Its capital was the town of Misrata. Initially in the 1930s was called "Provincia di Misurata" of Italian Libya. It was created out of the eastern part of Tripolitania province.

The governorate's population was 145,894 in 1964 and had risen to 156,980 by 1972.

== Misurata Provincia ==
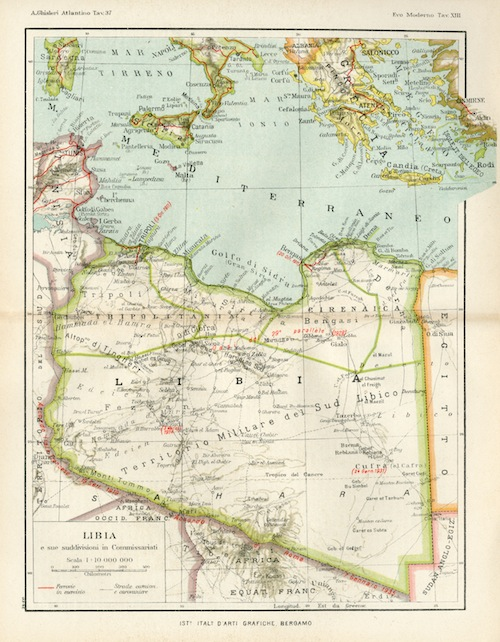
Map showing the "Provincia di Misursata" in 1939 Italian Libya

Before WW2 it was called Provincia di Misurata and had the same extension and capital. it was one of the four provinces of Italian Libya, that were created in 1937 as a "Metropolitan region" of the Kingdom of Italy.

It was divided in 3 sections (called "Circondari" in Italian):

- Misurata
- Zliten
- Khoms (Homs in Italian)

Some villages for Italian colonists were created in this 'province', greatly improving the farm production of the area: the most important was Villaggio Crispi.

The population in the 1939 Census was of nearly 225,000 inhabitants, most of which were Arabs and Berbers. The Italians were nearly 10,000 and were concentrated in Misurata, Homs and some newly created villages for Italian colonists (Gioda, Crispi, Littoriano, Corradini, etc.)

Most of the population was Muslim, but there was a growing community of Catholics due to the Italian colonists immigration. Additionally there were nearly one thousand Jews in Misurata.

The province from 1939 was considered officially part of the Kingdom of Italy, with the same laws. It was one of the 4 new Italian provinces of the so-called Quarta Sponda (Fourth Shore) of Mussolini's Greater Italy. Indeed, on January 9, 1939, the colony of Italian Libya was incorporated into "metropolitan Italy" and thereafter considered an integral part of the Italian state (the French, in 1848, had incorporated French Algeria in the same manner).

According to the 1939 Italian Census of Libya, these were the main population data:

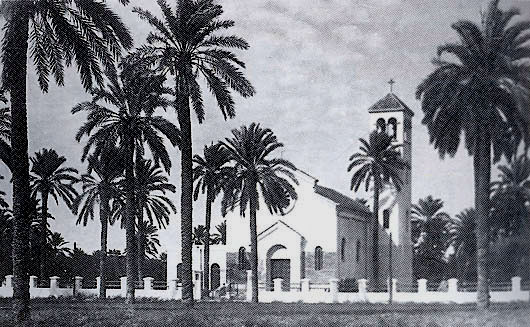
Catholic church of Zliten in 1939, now disappeared because destroyed in the 1960s

CITY'	INHABITANTS	ITALIANS	NOTES
Littoriano	150 pop.	150	Italian colonists village, now abandoned
Corradini	420 pop.	420	Italian colonist village, built in 1939
Homs	35,316 pop.	1,156	Italians nearly 3%
Misurata	46,321 pop.	1,472	Italians 3%
Gioda	1,550 pop.	1,550	Italian colonists village, built in 1939
Taworgha	5,174 pop.	-	village populated mostly by Blacks and a few Berbers
Sirte	15,014 pop.	303	Italians 2%
Nofaliya	3,459 pop.	35	Italians nearly 1%
Zliten	1,300 popo.	30	Italians nearly 3%

== Bibliography ==
- Del Boca, Angelo. Gli italiani in Libia. Vol. 2. Milano. Mondadori, 1997.

== See also ==
- Misrata
- Italian Libya
