= Sabha Governorate =

Governorate of Libya

Coordinates: 27°46′N 15°40′E

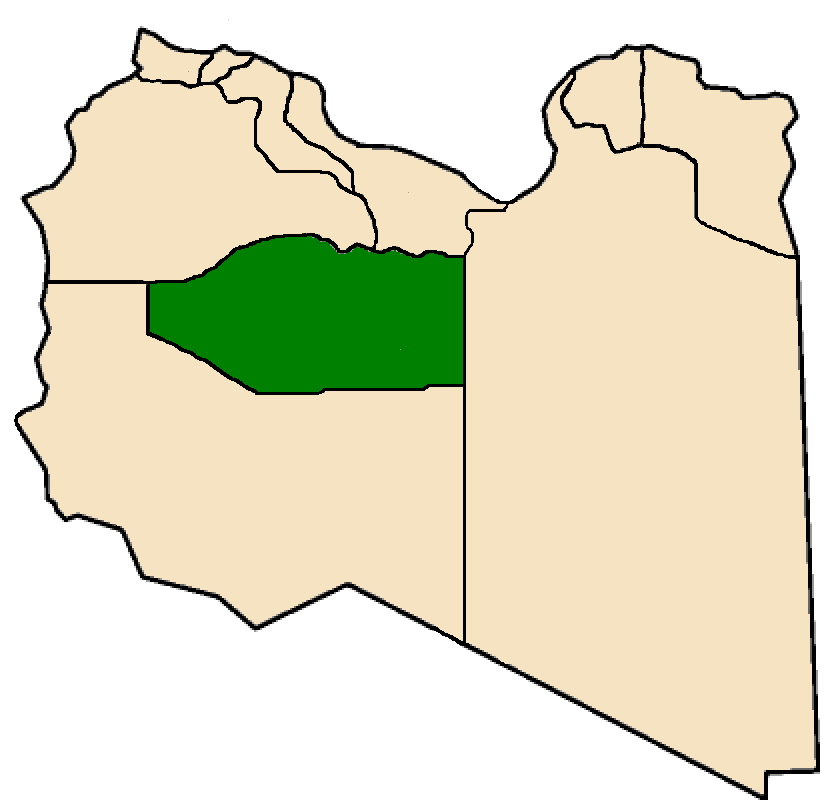
Location of Sabha Governorate within Libya

Sabha Governorate (or Sebha Governorate) was one of the governorates (muhafazah) of Libya from 1963 to 1983. It was formed from part of Fezzan province. Its capital was Sabha. In 1970, it had a population of around 97,000.
