= Muhafazah =

Arab-language territorial entity term

A muḥāfaẓah (Note: Arabic: مُحَافَظَة [muˈħaːfaðˤa]; pl. مُحَافَظَات muḥāfaẓāt [muħafaˈðˤaːt]) is a first-level administrative division of many Arab countries, and a second-level administrative division in Saudi Arabia. The term is usually translated as "governorate", and occasionally as "province".

It comes from the Arabic root ح-ا-ف-ظ, ḥ-ā-f-ẓ, (verb: حافظ, ḥāfaẓa), which means to "keep" and "guard".

The head of a muḥāfaẓah is a governor (Arabic: مُحَافِظ, muḥāfiẓ) .

The governorates of Tunisia are wilāyah in Arabic.

== Muhafazat in Arab countries ==
- Governorates of Bahrain
- Governorates of Egypt
- Governorates of Iraq
- Governorates of Jordan
- Governorates of Kuwait
- Governorates of Libya (historic)
- Governorates of Lebanon
- Governorates of Oman
- Governorates of Palestine
- Governorates of Saudi Arabia (2nd level)
- Governorates of Syria
- Governorates of Yemen
