= Governorates of Libya =

Historical administrative divisions of Libya

The governorates of Libya (muhafazah) were a tenfold top-level administrative division of Libya from 1963 until 1983.

They came into being on 27 April 1963. In 1970, after the 1 September 1969 Free Officers Movement coup, there was an administrative reorganization which gave local authorities more power to implement policies of the national government, and redesignated some of the names and boundaries of the ten governorates. In February 1975, Libya issued a law that abolished the governorates and their service directorates, however they continued to operate until they were fully replaced in 1983 by the baladiyat system districts.

Historically, the three provinces of Libya (Tripolitania in the northwest, Cyrenaica in the east, and Fezzan in the southwest) were sometimes called governorates.

== Ten governorates ==
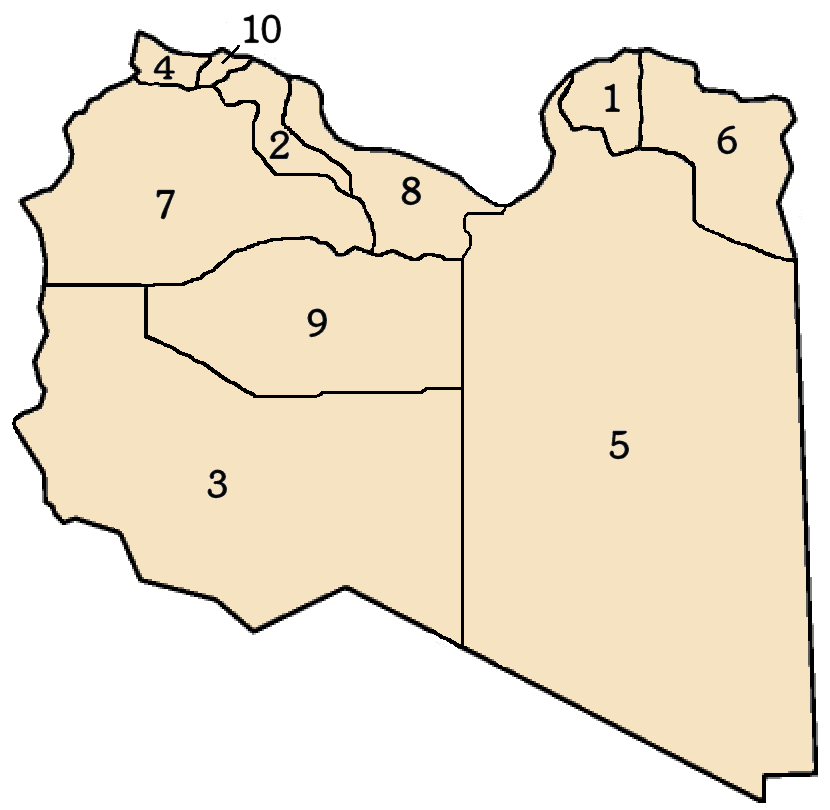
Ten governorates of Libya, numbers correspond to list at left.

The original ten governorates were:

1. Bayda Governorate
  In 1971 Bayda was renamed Jabal al Akhdar.
2. Al Khums Governorate
3. Awbari Governorate
4. Az Zawiyah Governorate
5. Benghazi Governorate
6. Darnah Governorate
7. Al Jabal al Gharbi Governorate
  In 1970 Al Jabal al Gharbi was renamed Gharyan.
8. Misrata Governorate
9. Sabha Governorate
10. Tarabulus Governorate.

== Reorganisation under Gaddafi ==
As early as 1973, Libya had been divided into forty-six baladiyat for census purposes. In 1983 Libya replaced the governorates structure with the district (baladiyah) one, creating forty-six districts.

== See also ==
- Districts of Libya
- Provinces of Libya
