= Tripoli Province =

Province of Libya under Italian rule

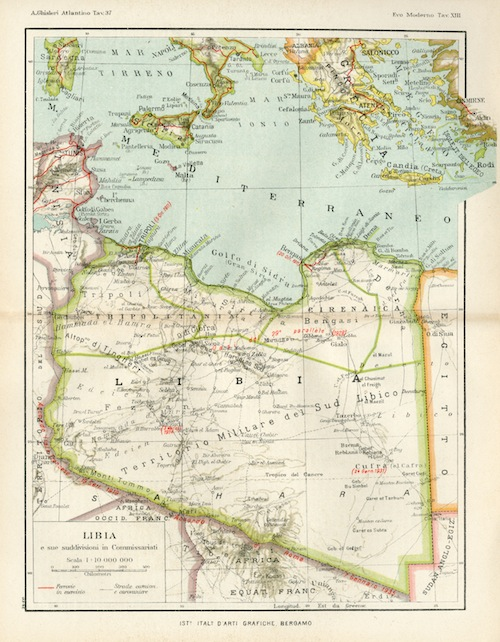
Provinces of Italian Libya in 1938, showing the "Tripoli Province" next to Tunisia

Tripoli Province (Provincia di Tripoli in Italian) was one of the provinces of Libya under Italian rule. It was established in 1937, with the official name: Commissariato Generale Provinciale di Tripoli. It lasted until 1947.

== Characteristics ==
The "Provincia di Tripoli" was located in northern Italian Libya, next to Tunisia. Its administrative center was the city of Tripoli on the Mediterranean coast and was administratively divided in 6 sections (called "Circondari" in Italian):

- Tripoli
- Zauia
- Sugh el Giumaa
- Zuara
- Nalut
- Garian

The province experienced a huge economic growth in the late 1930s, with a great urban development of Tripoli while Italian colonists cultivated lands (that had returned to native desert for many centuries) and improved Italian Libya's agriculture to international standards. This was accomplished even with the creation of new farm villages.

Most of the population was Muslim, but there was a growing community of Catholics due to the Italian colonists immigration. In 1940 there were more than 70,000 Catholics (of which 65,000 were Italians).

Additionally there were nearly 18,000 Jews in the Tripoli area. Indeed, after the Italian occupation of Libya in 1911, the Jews made great strides in education and economic conditions: at that time, there were about 21,000 Jews in the country, the majority in Tripoli. In the late 1930s, Fascist anti-Jewish laws were gradually enforced, and Jews were subject to moderate repression: still, by 1941 -due even to the partial rejection of those laws by governor Italo Balbo- the Jews accounted for a quarter of the population of Tripoli and maintained 44 synagogues

The province from 1939 was considered officially part of the Kingdom of Italy, with the same laws. It was one of the 4 new Italian provinces of the so-called Quarta Sponda ("Fourth Shore") of Mussolini's Imperial Italy. Indeed, on January 9, 1939, the colony of Italian Libya was incorporated into "Metropolitan Italy" and thereafter considered an integral part of the Italian state (the French, in 1848, had incorporated French Algeria in the same manner).

In the coast of the province was built in 1937-1938 a section of the Litoranea Balbia, a road that went from Tripoli and Tunisia's frontier to the border of Egypt.

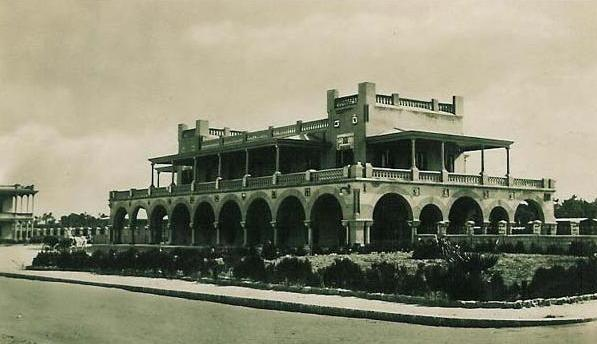
Tripoli railway station in 1940

The car tag for the Italian province of Tripoli was "TL". In the province was even created the Tripoli Grand Prix, an international motor racing event first held in 1925 on a racing circuit outside Tripoli (it lasted until 1940).

Tripoli had a railway station with some small railway connections to nearby cities, when in August 1941 the Italians started to build a new 1040 km railway (with a 1435 mm. gauge, like the one used in Egypt and Tunisia) between Tripoli and Benghazi.

But the war (with the defeat of the Italian Army) stopped the construction the next year. The project was stopped in the fall of 1942, leaving many infrastructures like stations and connection roads already done in the "Provincia di Tripoli".

== Population ==
The indigenous population was Arab, with some berbers in the Nafusa Mountains south of Tripoli and some thousands Jews and a few Maltese on the coast. The Italians colonized the coastal cities and were mainly in the capital Tripoli, where they were nearly half the inhabitants in 1940.

According to the 1936 census, which allowed citizens to declare their ethnicity, Tripoli's native population was made up of 79.1% Arabs, 9.8% Berbers, 3.4% Blacks, 1.7% Turks and 6% Others.

In the province of Tripoli thousands of Italians (called "ventimilli") moved to live in 1938 and 1939 and founded some agricultural villages (like "Bianchi", "Giordani", "Oliveti", "Marconi", etc..).

According to the 1939 Italian Census of Libya, these were the main population data:

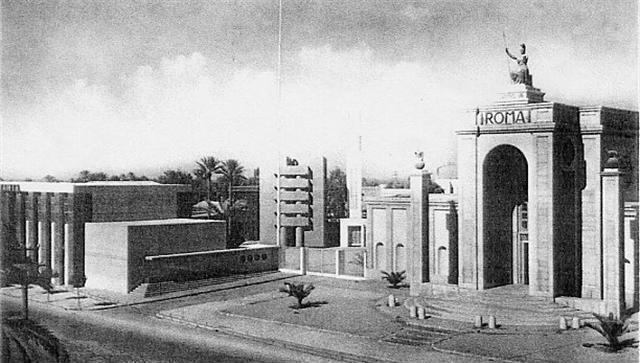
Tripoli International Fair in Tripoli, Libya.

CITY	INHABITANTS	ITALIANS	NOTES
Tripoli	111,124 pop.	41,304	Nearly 50,000 Italians lived in the city and surroundings: 37% of the city's inhabitants.
Castel Benito	10,759 pop.	567	Italians were nearly 5%.
Zanzur	14.408 pop.	289	Italians were nearly 2%.
Bianchi	2,854 pop.	2,854	Italian agricultural village founded in 1937 by ETL & INFPS
Giordani	2,300 pop.	2,300	Italian agricultural village founded in 1938 by ETL & INFPS.
Oliveti	1,300 pop.	1,300	Italian agricultural village founded in 1938 by INFPS & ETL.
Zuavia	30,033 pop.	2,040	Italians were nearly 6%.
Sorman	13,137 pop.	262	Italians more than 2%.
Sabratha	23,407	397	Italians were 1,7%.
Zuwara	27,956 pop.	662	Italians were nearly 2%.
Castelverde	6,458 pop.	270	Italians were nearly 4%: today is called GASR GARABULLI.
Mizda	1,113 pop.	-	Village mostly berber.
Giado	14,466 pop.	48	Italians were 0,3%.
Nalut	20,471 pop.	126	Italians were 0,6%.

== Bibliography ==
- Capresi, Vittoria. I centri rurali libici. L´architettura dei centri rurali di fondazione costruiti in Libia – colonia italiana – durante il fascismo (1934-1940). PhD, Vienna University of Technology, 2007.
- Chapin Metz, Helen, ed., Libya: A Country Study. Washington: GPO for the Library of Congress, 1987.
- Istituto Agricolo Coloniale (Firenze). La colonizzazione agricola della Tripolitania. Ministero degli affari esteri, Tip. Del senato di G. Bardi, Roma 1946.
- Luiggi, Luigi, Le opere pubbliche a Tripoli. Note di Viaggio, in: Nuova Antologia, XLVII, fasc.965, 1 marzo 1912, p. 115.

== See also ==
- Derna Province
- Benghazi Province
- Misurata Province
- Territorio Sahara Libico
- Italian Libya
- Italian Tripolitania
- Italian settlers in Libya
- Italian Libya Railways
- Tripoli Grand Prix
- Provinces of Libya
- Fourth Shore
