= Italian Benghazi =

Italian colonial name for the port-city of Benghazi

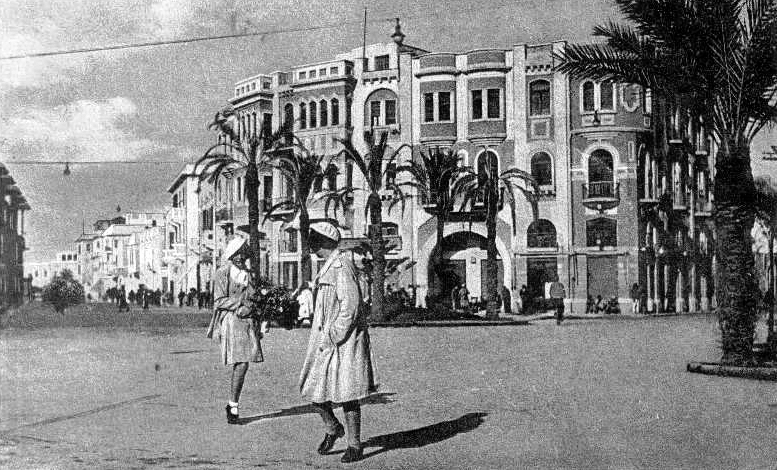
Piazza Cagni, now called Maydan al Shajara, in 1938 Italian Benghazi

Italian Benghazi (Italian: Bengasi italiana) was the name used during the Italian colonization of Libya for the port-city of Benghazi in Italian Cyrenaica.

== History ==
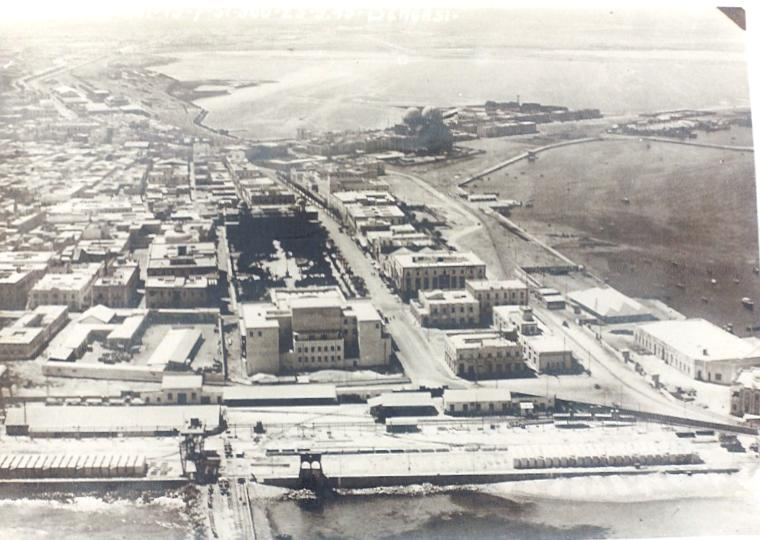
Aerial view Italian Benghazi in 1940

On October 19, 1911, the Ottoman city of Benghazi was occupied by the Italians during the Italo-Turkish War.

Many local Arabs formerly under Senussi leadership suffered oppression, particularly from the fascist dictator Mussolini in the late 1920s.

In the early 1930s, the revolt was over and the Italians—under governor Italo Balbo—started to assimilate the local population with pacifying policies: a number of new villages for local Cyrenaicans were created with health services and schools.

Additionally Cyrenaica was populated by more than 20,000 Italian colonists in the late 1930s, mainly around the coast of Benghazi. 35% of the city consisted of Italians in 1939. In 1941 Italian Benghazi - according to estimates of the Italian government - reached a temporary population of nearly 80,000 inhabitants, due to the arrival of many Italians from Cyrenaica who took refuge from British attacks during World War II. As a consequence in that year, for the first time since the Arab conquest in 643 AD, Benghazi was a predominantly Christian city.

Population of the main urban centers of Italian Libya, according to the census of 1939/40:

| Town | Italians | Arabs | Jews | Total | Notes |
|---|---|---|---|---|---|
| Benghazi | 23,075 | 40,331 | 3,395 | 66,801 | Most of the Italians of Cyrenaica took refuge in Benghazi in 1941 |
| Tripoli | 47,442 | 47,123 | 18,467 | 113,212 | Population of the main urban centers of Italian Libya, according to the census of 1939/40, showing that Italians were the main community in the city of Tripoli |
| Misurata | 1,735 | 44,387 | 977 | 47,099 | Half of the Italians of Misurata moved to Tripoli in 1941 and 1942 |
| Derna | 3,562 | 13,555 | 391 | 17,508 | Nearly all the Italians of Derna moved to Benghazi in 1941 and later to Tripoli in 1942 |

Bengasi italiana was conquered by the British Army in February 1941, but after only 2 months (when Australian troops harassed the civilian population) the Italians reconquered the city with the help of Rommel's Afrika Korps. The British definitively occupied the city after the Battle of El Alamein. Benghazi was heavily bombed during World War II (more than one thousand times) and when the British finally occupied the city in December 1942 nearly 85% of it was damaged or destroyed.

Benghazi was then governed by the British until independence in 1951. Under the terms of the 1947 peace treaty with the Allies Italy relinquished all claims to Libya.

After World War II, the era of international decolonization fostered an exodus of Italians from Benghazi, especially after Libya became independent in 1953. After 1970 the Italian population of the city, reduced to a few hundred inhabitants, practically disappeared when Libyan president Muammar Gaddafi ordered the expulsion of all Italians from his country. At present, the Libyan Italians (and the few Bengasini still living) are organized in the Associazione Italiani Rimpatriati dalla Libia.

Italian Benghazi was again severely damaged in the Battle of Benghazi, during the Second Libyan Civil War. Those who did not leave the quarter at the onset of the fighting were ordered to leave following the victory of Khalifa Haftar's Libyan National Army (LNA) in 2017.

The remains of Italian Benghazi have been a target of the LNA since Haftar's victory. In March 2023, a large group of Italian-era buildings, including the Berenice Theatre, Albergo hotel, and dozens of buildings along Omar Al Mukhtar Street, were demolished in the middle of the night by the LNA, with no plans to rebuild. The municipal government was not notified of the operation. Despite outrage from Benghazi locals and Libyans abroad, the Italian consul in Benghazi stated that the demolitions did not constitute an assault on Benghazi's colonial heritage, and were intended to remove buildings damaged beyond repair during the war.

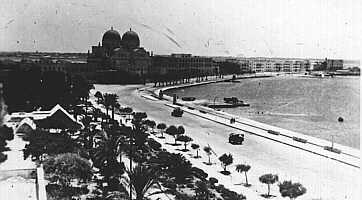
Italians settlers founded the Lungomare (sea-walk) of Benghazi and constructed many other buildings

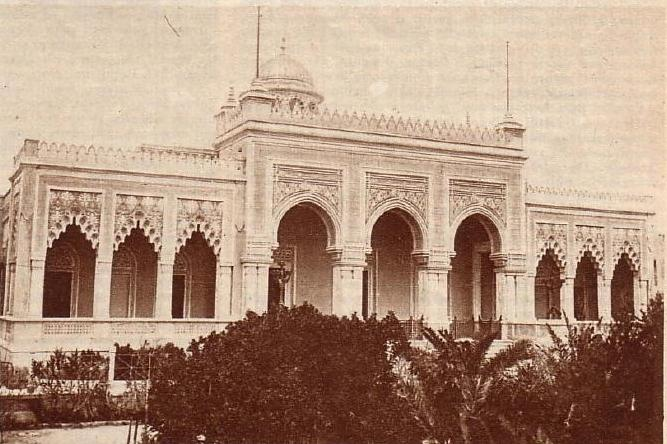
The Littorio Palace in Benghazi, later the seat of the Cyrenaican Regional Assembly.

== Characteristics ==
Italian Benghazi was located in northern Italian Libya, in Cyrenaica. It was the administrative center of the Italian Benghazi Province, on the Mediterranean coast.

In 1911 Ottoman Benghazi had less than 5,000 inhabitants, and nearly one half of them were Jews, who welcomed the Italians. The Italians conquered the region from the Ottomans in 1911. It was very poor and underdeveloped, reportedly having no asphalted roads, no telegraph services, no sewage system and no hospitals (in 1874 Benghazi had been depopulated by the bubonic plague).

In the 1920s a railway line was built in Benghazi Provinece, between Benghazi and Barce: a 750 mm (2 ft 5 1/2 in) (later 950 mm) gauge railway was also built east from Benghazi; the main route was 110 km long to Marj and was opened in stages between 1911 and 1927. Benghazi also had a 56 km branch to Suluq opened in 1926.

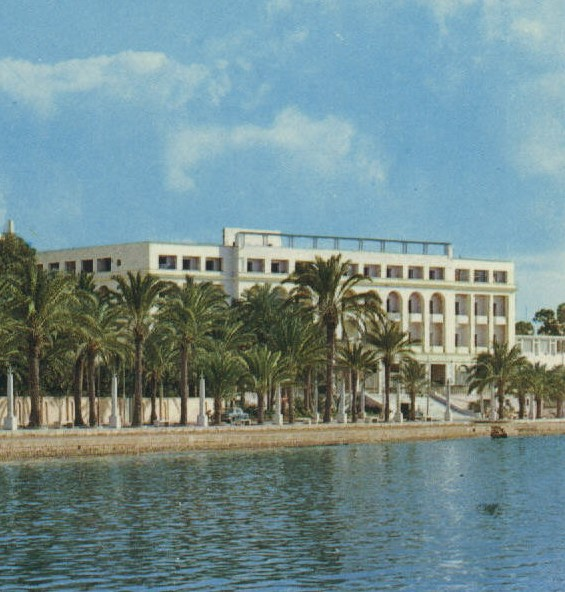
The Berenice Albergo hotel (demolished 2023)

In the late 1920s the Benghazi Airport (now Benina International Airport) was built and the Port of Benghazi had been greatly enlarged. Inside the port in the 1930s, a modern "Idroscalo" (seaplane station) for flights between Bengasi italiana and Italy was built. Benghazi Airport was connected to Italy and other Libyan airports, but the main flights from it were the Linea dell'Impero. This line of Ala Littoria was considered the most prestigious line of early Italian civil aviation era: it was opened after the Italian conquest of Ethiopia in 1936 and was followed by the first air links with the Italian colonies in Italian East Africa. The route was enlarged to 6,379 km and initially joined Rome with Addis Ababa via Syracuse, Benghazi, Cairo, Wadi Halfa, Khartoum, Kassala, Asmara and Dire Dawa.

Between 1937 and 1938 a section of the Via Balbia was built, a road that went from Italian Tripoli and Tunisia's frontier to the border of Egypt. The car tag for the Italian province of Benghazi was "BE".

Thousands of Italians were settled in Benghazi in the 1930s as farmers in special villages. Most of these settlers were concentrated in the city of Benghazi, where they were in 1939 nearly one third of the population. In the late 1930s the "Stadio Municipale" was built by the Italian settlers, one of the first stadiums in Libya.

Benghazi came under Italian rule in the early part of the 20th century: some examples of Italianate, as well as modernist colonial architecture from this period remain today. Under the governorships of Generals Ernesto Mombelli and Attilio Teruzzi in the 1920s, the buildings commissioned in Benghazi had an eclectic architectural language that embodied a Western conception of Eastern architecture. An example of this is the Municipal Palace built in 1924, which stands in the Maydan al-Hurriya (Freedom Square). The building combines Moorish arches with Italianate motifs on the facade. Additionally, the Italians created the first architectural plan of Benghazi in the 1930s, with a new railway station and large promenade.

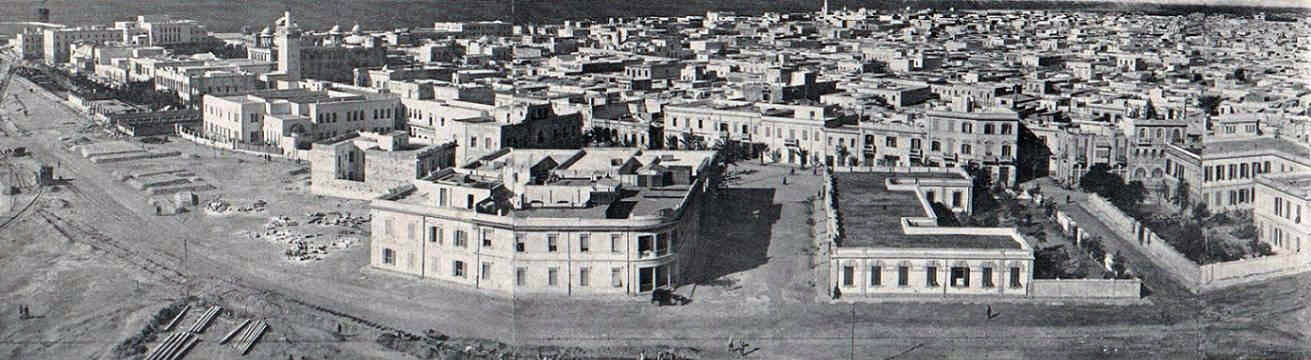
Panorama of Bengasi italiana in 1935, during the construction of a new road.

== Urban plan and infrastructures ==
The first Italian infrastructures in Benghazi dated at the time of the conquest, in late 1911, when was done the enlargement of the small Ottoman port that was greatly improved and when was created the communication network with the interior through the construction of two railway lines. Between 1922 and the early thirties the Italian government was organizing an Italian-populated center in the area that overlooked the harbour, encircling the Arab city, as it happened in the initial period with the Military barracks "Generale Torelli", the Military "Autogruppo" and other equipments & infrastructures of this type.

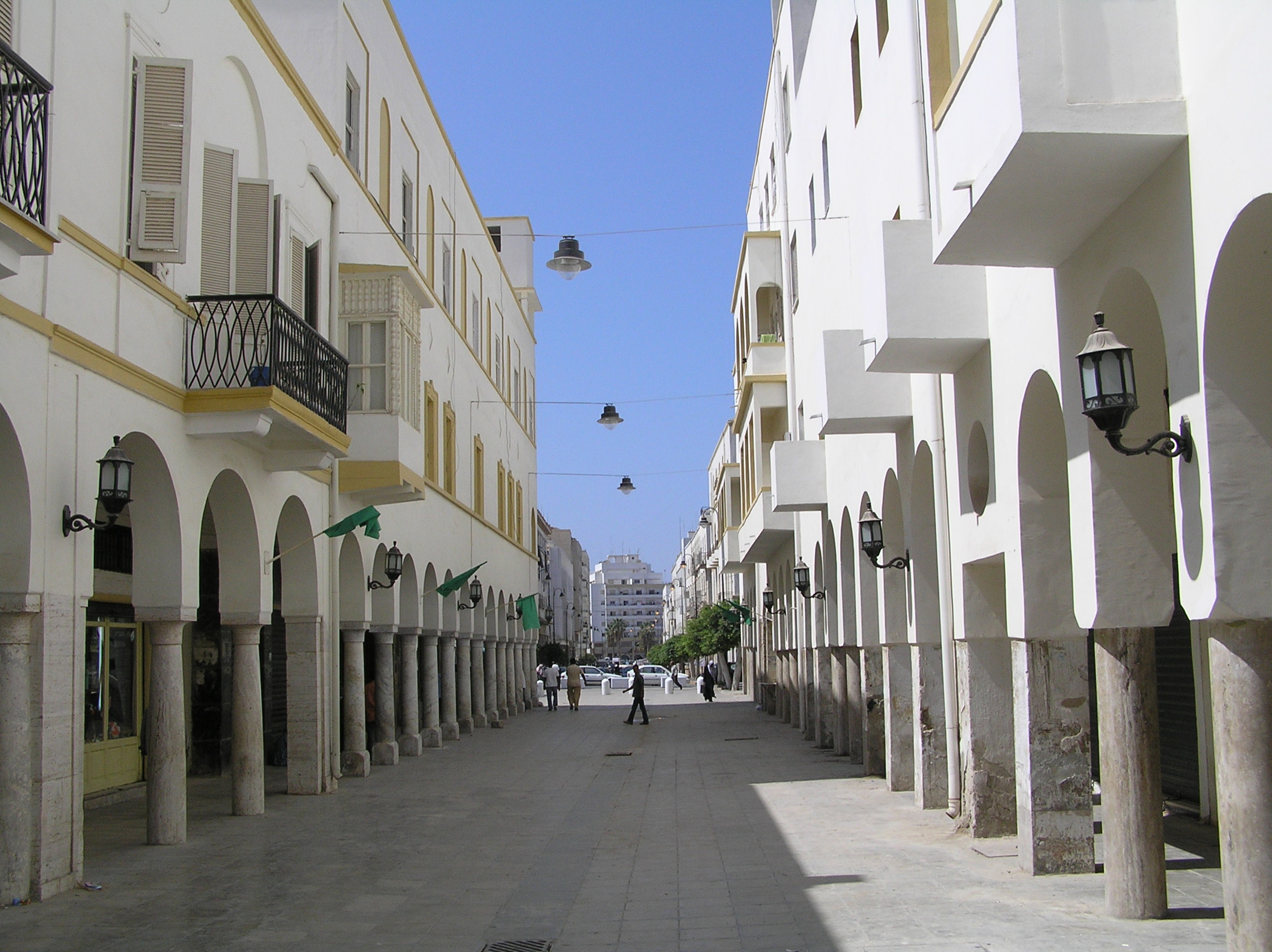
Omar Al Mukhtar Street (former Via Roma) in the Italian quarter was home to many Italians, before many of them left the old town to resettle outside Libya after World War II. Many buildings along the street were demolished in 2023.

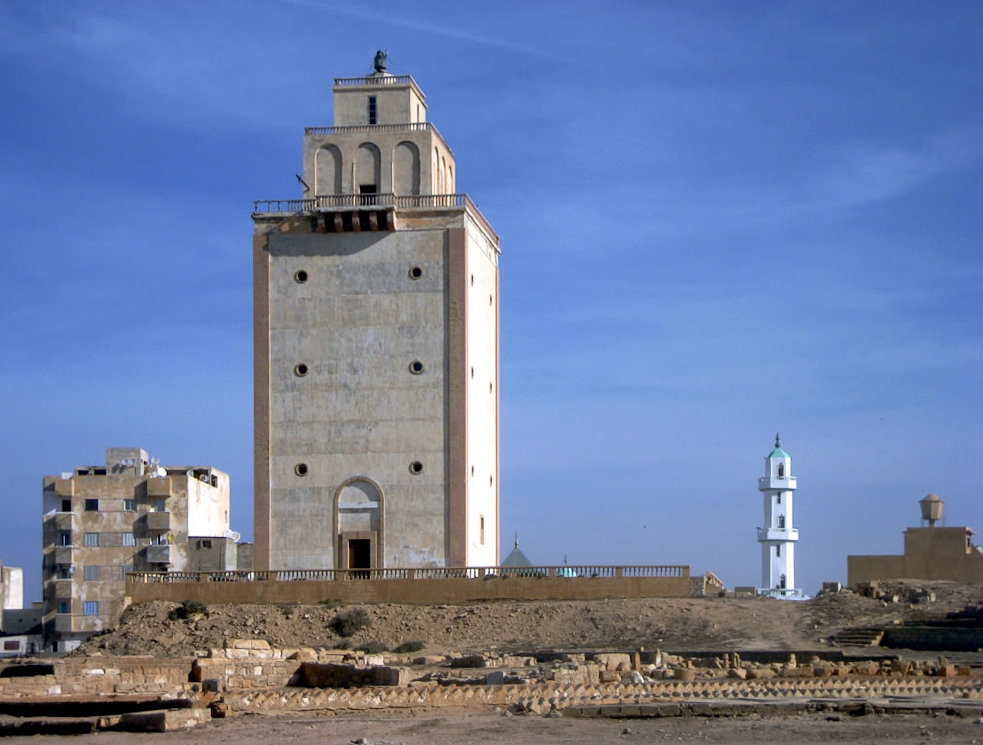
The Italian lighthouse in Benghazi, built in 1922 during Italian colonial rule.

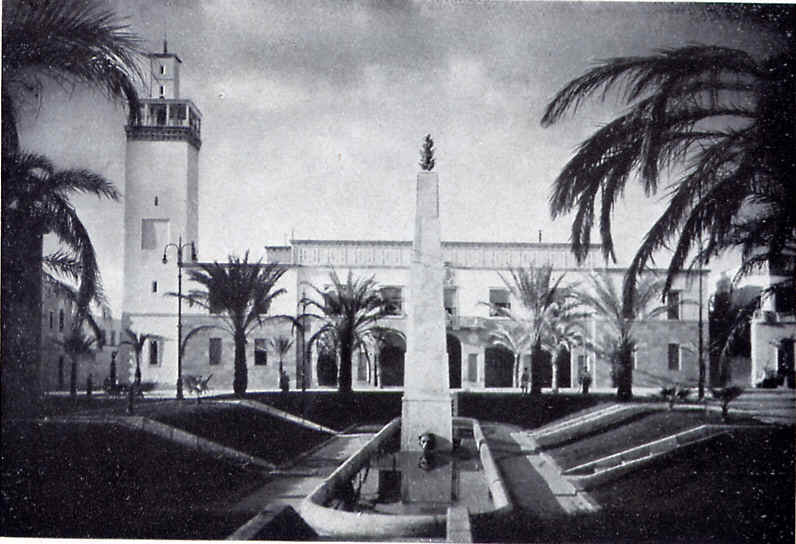
"Palazzo del Governatore", later renamed Al Manar Palace.

The heart of the Italian city was constituted by the "King's Square", former Ottoman Salt Square that was called in Italian "Piazza del Re", with the central part arranged as a garden park. On it overlooked the Palace Government, a Moorish-style building, later the seat of the "Parliament of Cyrenaica", which housed the Library and the Civil Court, and other remarkable architectural buildings.

In the square there was the "Corso Italia", lined with palm trees, the main artery of the city leading to the new "Benghazi Train Station"; on it stood the main facade of the Governor's Palace (built in 1928–34), designed by the architects Alberto Alpago Novello, Ottavio Cabiati and Guido Ferrazza, overlooking "Piazza XXVIII October". Here were lined up various buildings such as the Elementary and Middle School and the Sports Club. King's Square was connected by the axis of "Via Roma" and "Via Generale Briccola", the Town Hall Square, located within the ancient city, in which stood the Town Hall built in the Moorish style.

The Benghazi Municipal Hall was built in 1924 and was considered one of the best colonial buildings in Africa. While the facades were designed by the architect Ivo Lebboroni, the interior frescoes are the work of Guido Cadorin, and the chandeliers are by Umberto Bellotto. The furniture inside the town hall was designed by the company Ducrot. The portico of the facade and the interiors were designed by Roman architect Marcello Piacentini: the style of his buildings is characteristic of the Neo-Moorish period of Italian colonial architecture in Libya in the 1920s. This is evident in his "Albergo Italia" as well as the "Berenice Theatre" in central Benghazi. Piacentini was later made project manager of all Italian building works in Cyrenaica.

In 1928 the Milan studio of architecture owned by Alpago Novello, Cabiati and Ferrazza, got the task of studying a "Plan of Benghazi", where they had already designed the Cathedral (built in 1928–34), located in the Square "Martiri Fascisti" (Fascist Martyrs).

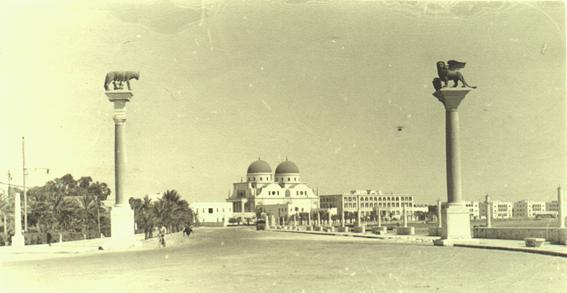
The Catholic Cathedral was connected to the Via Vittoria, that had 2 columns with the Venetian lion and the Roman wolf.

Furthermore, in the 1930s many architects came from Italy to work and create the new "Bengasi italiana": Limongelli, Alpago Novello, Cabiati, Ferrazza, Di Fausto, Rava, Piccinato, Pellegrini, Gennari and Di Segni were the most famous

The new Benghazi therefore was developed between the old city and the suburb of Berca through the isthmus situated between the "Punta Saline" in the West, where arose the "Industrial basin and Docking area", and the saline Ain es-Selmani eastward. The main axis on which the Plan was based were the "Via Scerif" and the street parallel, obtained by the extension of "Corso Italia". The goal was to merge in an organic unity the distinct areas of the city incorporating the existing structures: although the trend, at least for the old section, was always that of separation from the Italian-populated city, as demonstrated with the enlargement of Aghib street and the expansion planned for the axis of Via Roma and Via Generale Briccola, where in some buildings were built huge arcades (as in northern Italy).

The largest colonial building from this Italian period is the Benghazi Cathedral in "Maydan El Catedraeya" (Cathedral Square), which was inaugurated in 1934 and has two large distinct domes. The Cathedral -an example of neo-classical architecture- was designed with an entrance that has a portico with six Doric columns, by the Italian famous architects Guido Ottavo and Ottavio Cabiati.

Cabiati also created the "Palazzo del Governatore" (later called "Al Manar Palace" and campus site of the University of Libya) and the large "Lungomare" (promenade).

== Gallery ==
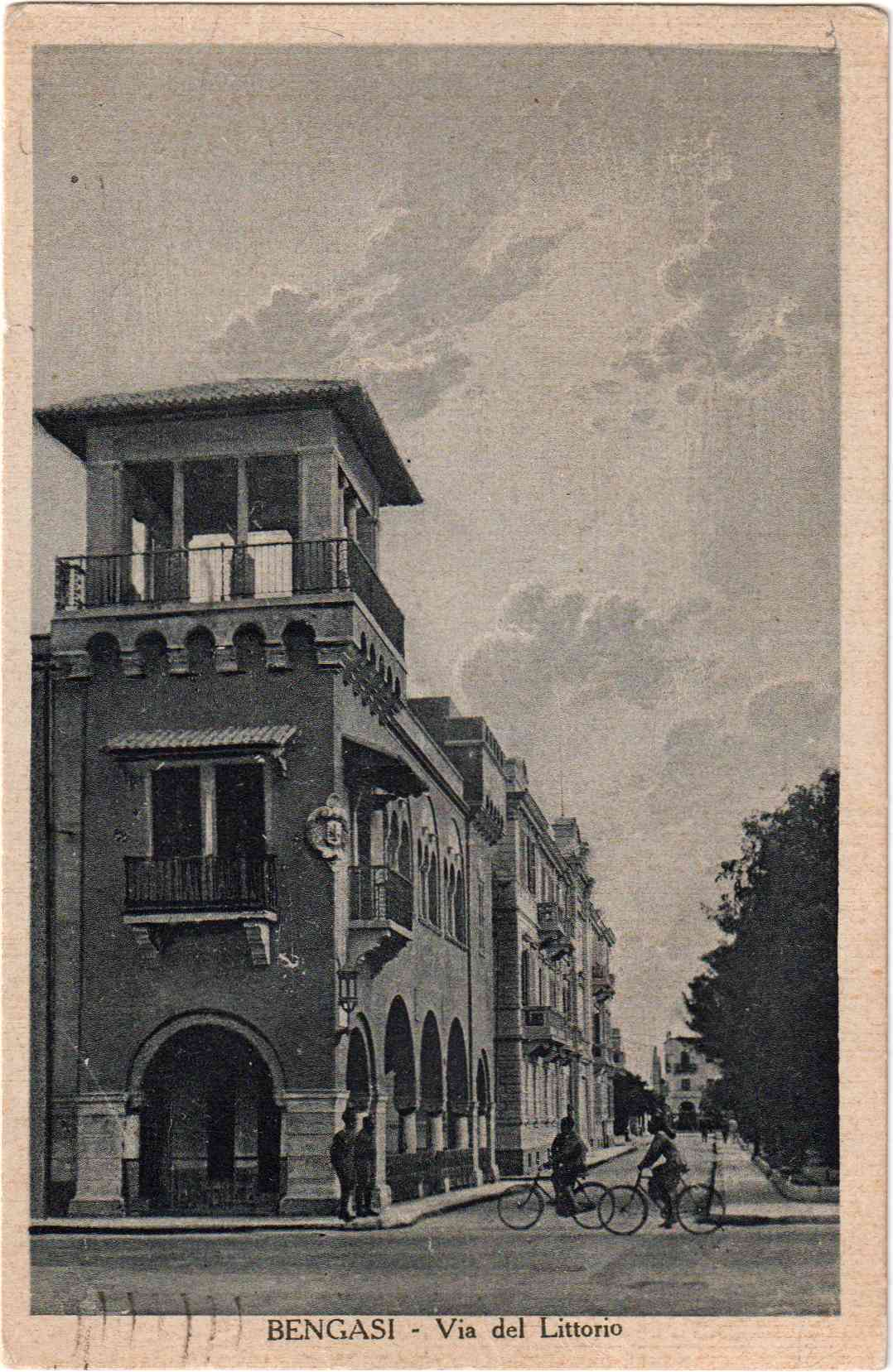
Via del Littorio, Benghazi 1935

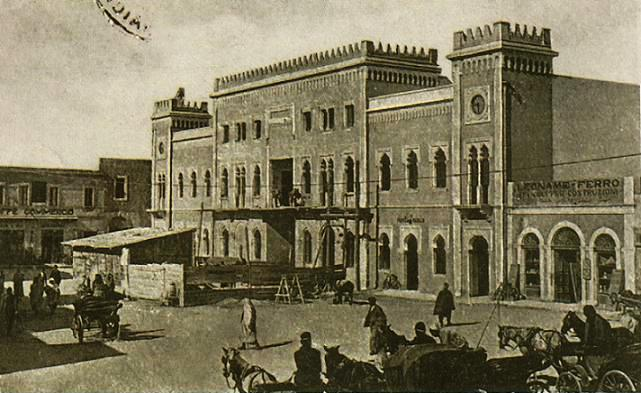
Construction of the "Bengasi Municipio" (City Hall) in the 1920s

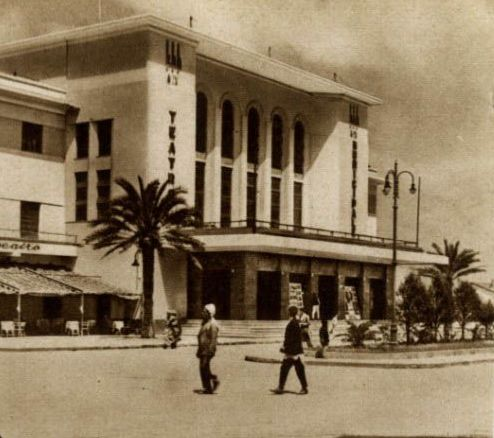
Theater Berenice of Benghazi in 1928

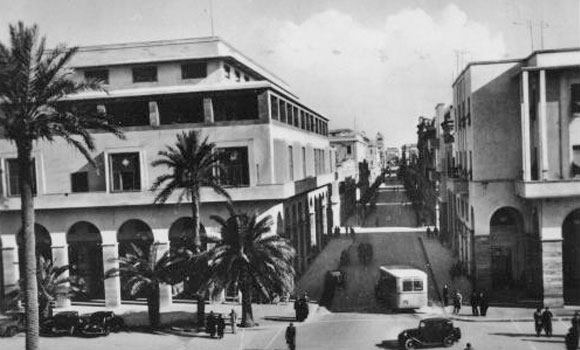
Via Roma in 1940

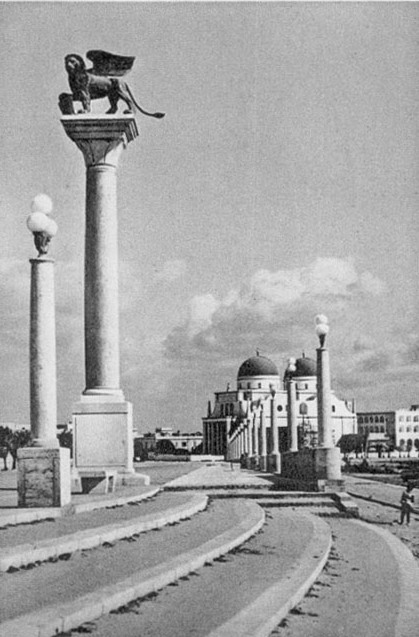
Via Vittoria in 1939

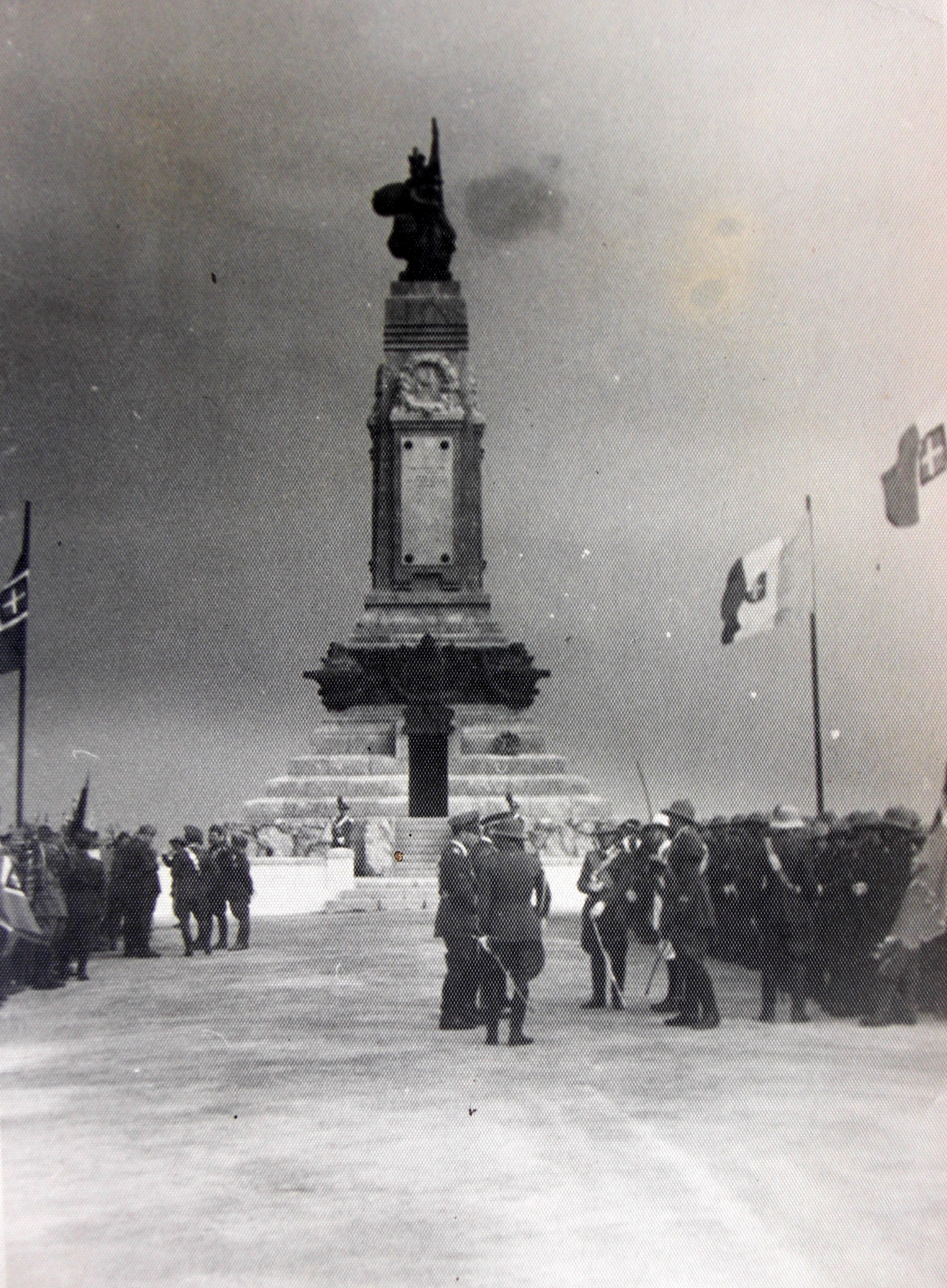
Monument to victory in the First World War, during the 1938 visit of the King of Italy.

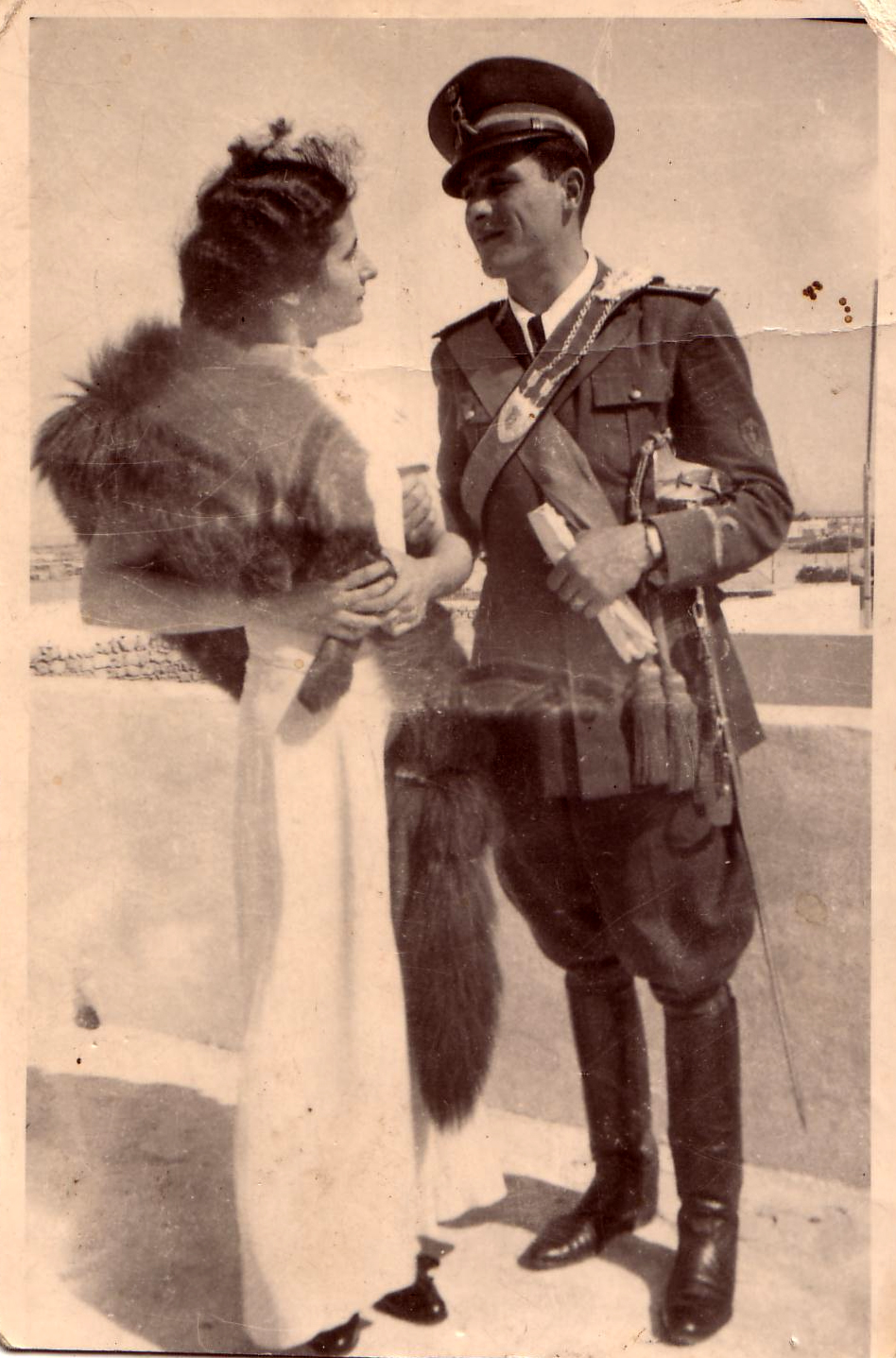
Italians resident in 1938 Benghazi

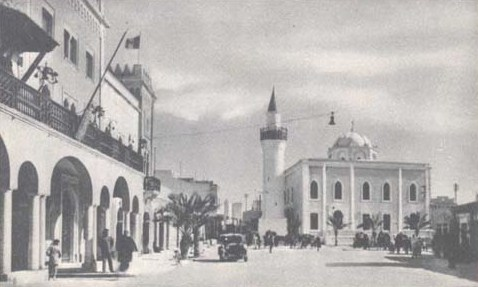
Piazza Municipio in the 1930s

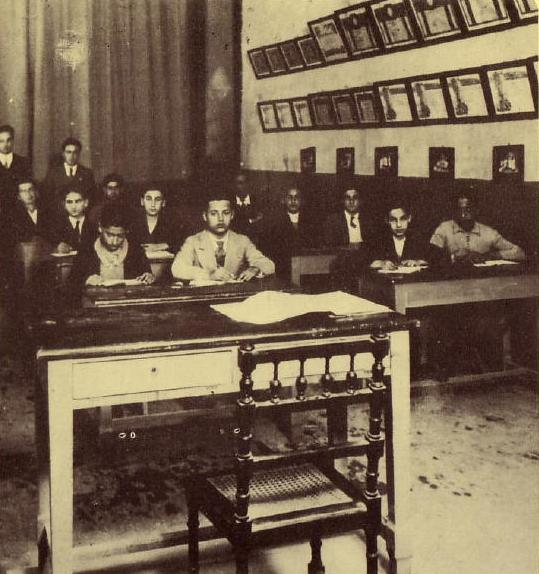
Benghazi Jews in a synagogue classroom (1939)

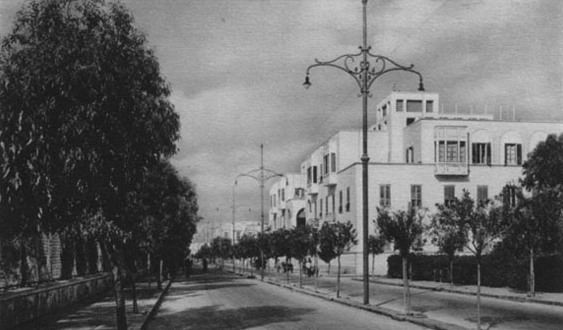
Via Indipendenza in 1940 Benghazi

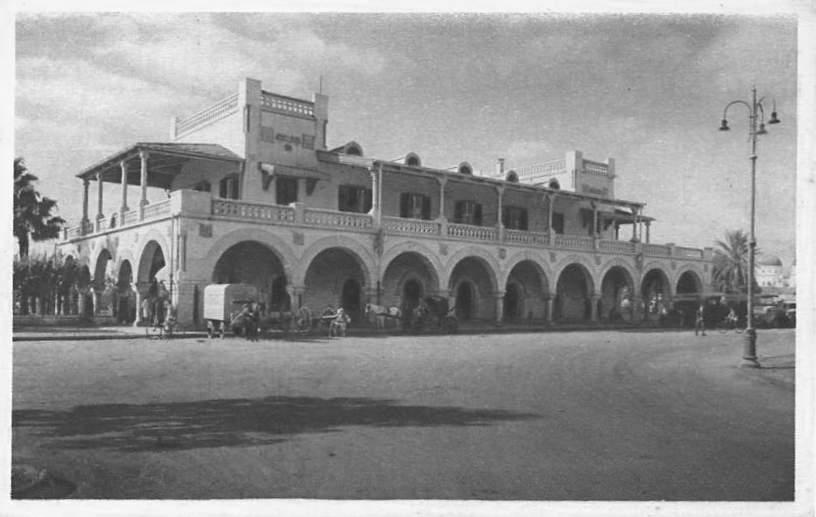
Benghazi Railway Station in 1930

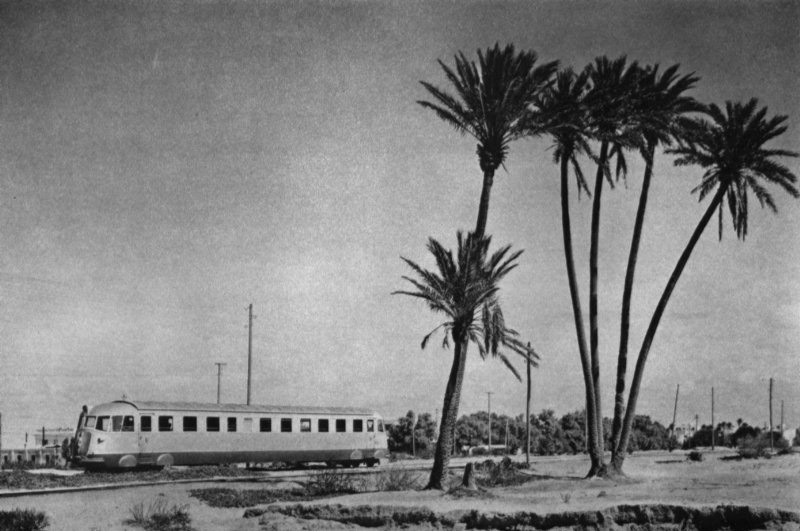
Fiat "Littorina" passing in Cyrenaica near Benghazi

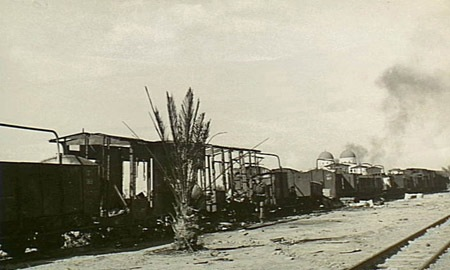
Destruction of Benghazi railway station in 1943

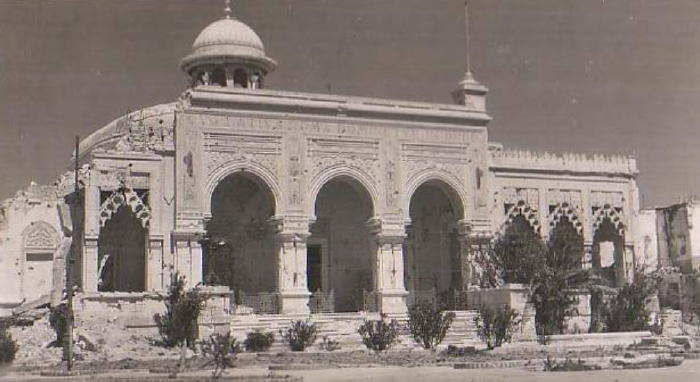
Palazzo Littorio (the seat of the Cyrenaican Parliament) after World War II

== See also ==
- Bengasi (film)

== Bibliography ==
- Antonicelli, Franco. Trent'anni di storia italiana 1915-1945. Mondadori. Turin, 1961.
- Bertarelli, Luigi Vittorio. Guida d'Italia: Possedimenti e colonie. Touring Club Italiano. Milan, 1929
- Bollati, Ambrogio. Enciclopedia dei nostri combattimenti coloniali, Einaudi. Turin, 1936
- Calace, Francesca. "Restituiamo la Storia" – dagli archivi ai territori. Architetture e modelli urbani nel Mediterraneo orientale. Gangemi, Rome, 2012
- Capresi, Vittoria. I centri rurali libici. L´architettura dei centri rurali di fondazione costruiti in Libia – colonia italiana – durante il fascismo (1934-1940). Vienna University of Technology. Vienna, 2007
- Chapin Metz, Helen. Libya: A Country Study. Washington: GPO for the Library of Congress, 1987
- Guida d'Italia del TCI. Possedimenti e colonie Edizioni Touring Club. Milan, 1929
- Pagano, Giovanni. Architettura e città durante il fascismo. Editori Laterza. Rome, 1990
- Santoianni, Vittorio. Il Razionalismo nelle colonie italiane 1928-1943.La "nuova architettura" delle Terre d’Oltremare. Ed. Universita' Federico II. Napoli, 2008 ()
- Sean Anderson. "The Light and the Line: Florestano Di Fausto and the Politics of Mediterraneità". California Italian Studies. University of California, 2010.
