= Southern Military Territory =

Jurisdictional territory within the colony of Italian Libya

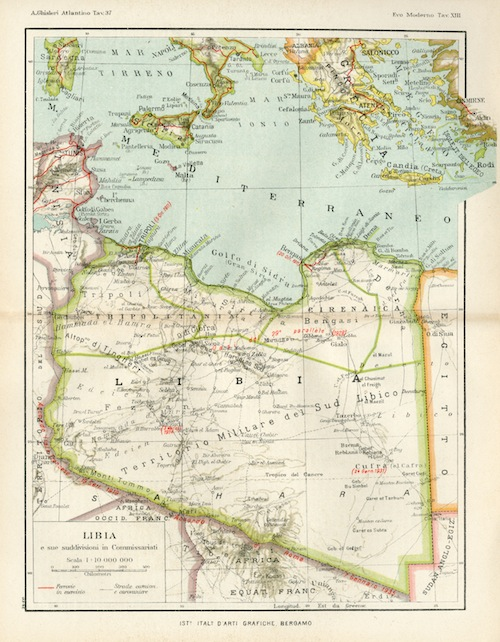
"Territorio militare del Sud libico" (Southern military territory of Libya) inside Italian Libya

The Southern Military Territory (Italian: Territorio Militare del Sud) was a jurisdictional territory within the Italian colonies of Cyrenaica and Tripolitania (1911-1934) and later Italian Libya (1934–1947), administered by the Italian military in the Libyan Sahara.

== Data ==
This military territory was below Italian Libya's four coastline provinces of Tripoli, Misurata, Benghazi and Derna. Administratively it was the only part of Italian Libya managed by the Royal Italian Army, and was divided in four military sections

- Homs
- Murzuch - El Giof
- Brach
- Gat

The population was mostly Arab, with minorities of Berbers and black Africans. Italians were concentrated in the administrative capital Hon, but there were a few even in the fortress Gadames. In 1938 the Military Territory had 1,100,000 km^{2} with 50,889 inhabitants (nomads like the Tuaregs were not calculated as resident population). The military territory expanded after concessions from Anglo-Egyptian Sudan and a territorial agreement with Egypt. The Kingdom of Italy at the 1919 Paris "Conference of Peace" received nothing from German colonies, but as a compensation, the United Kingdom gave it the Oltre Giuba and France agreed to give some Saharan territories to Italian Libya.

=== The French Aouzou strip ===
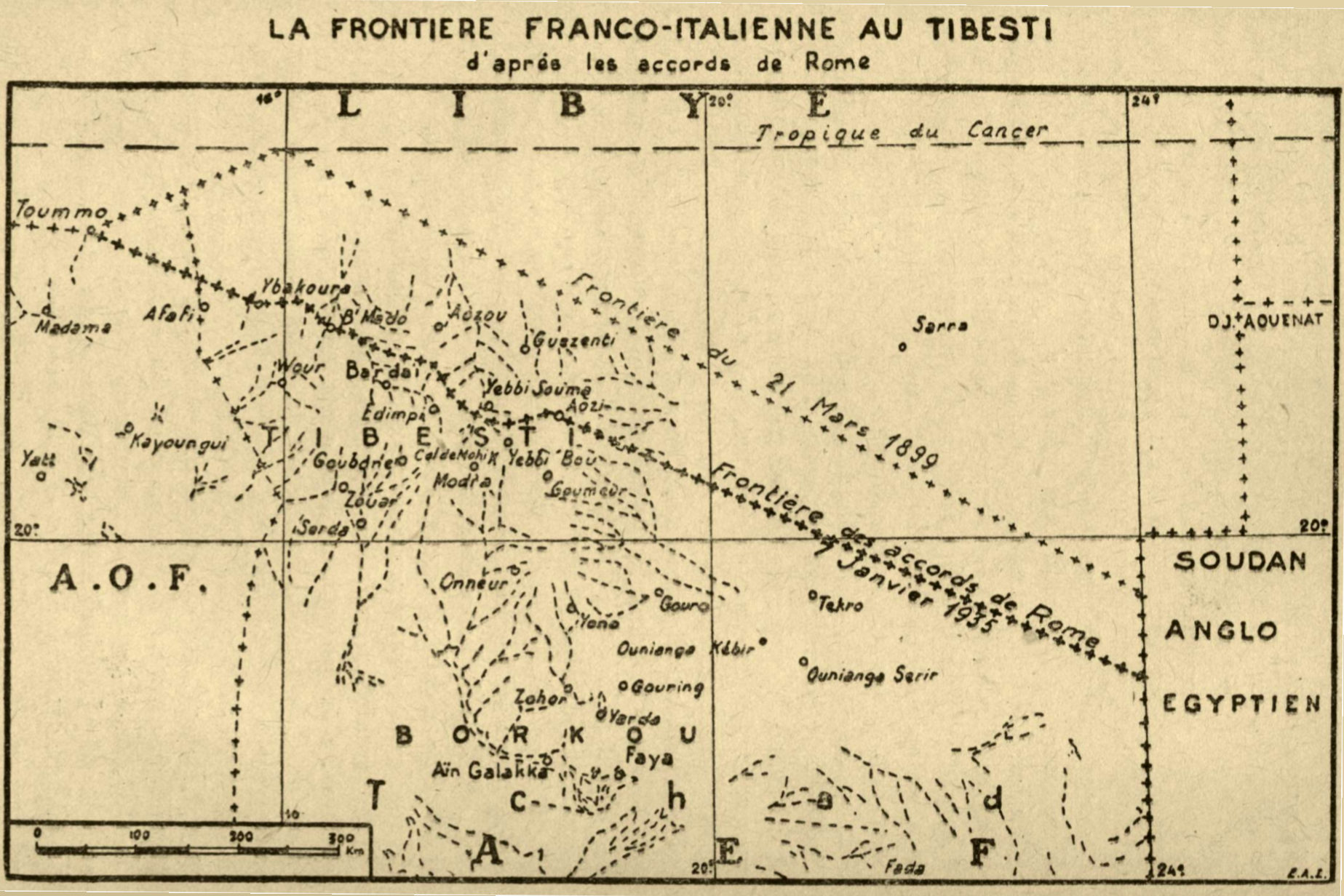
Detailed 1935 map of the Aouzou Strip

The Aouzou strip was defined for the first time in the discussions between France and Italy after World War I, in relation to an award to Italy for the victory in that war. At the Paris Peace Conference (1919–1920), the Kingdom of Italy did not receive any of the German colonies, but instead was given the Oltre Giuba from the United Kingdom, and France agreed to give some Saharan territories to Italian Libya.

After many discussions during the 1920s, the Franco-Italian Agreement of 1935 was signed between Benito Mussolini and Pierre Laval, which included a provision under which Italy would receive the Aouzou strip, which was to be added to Libya.

The Mussolini–Laval agreement of 1935 transferred this "Strip" from Chad, then part of French Equatorial Africa, to Italian Libya., but remained "unratified".

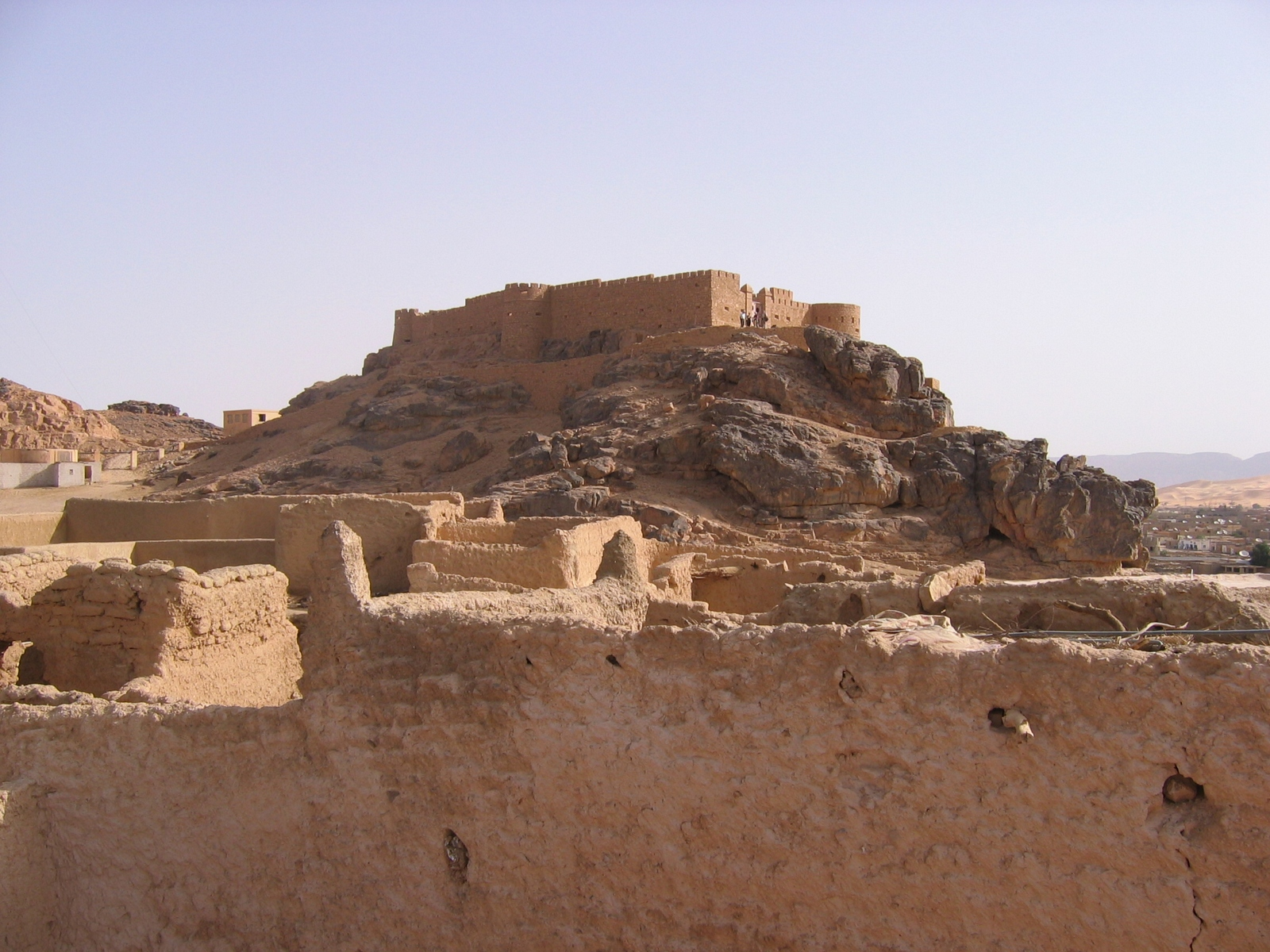
Italian fort in Ghat, built in the 1930s

In 1931, the towns of El Tag and Al Jawf were taken over by Italy. Egypt had ceded Kufra district to Italian Libya in 1919, but it was not until the early 1930s that Italy was in full control of the place. In 1931, during the campaign of Cyrenaica, General Rodolfo Graziani easily conquered Kufra District, considered a strategic region, leading about 3,000 soldiers from infantry and artillery, supported by about twenty bombers. Ma'tan as-Sarra was turned over to Italy in 1934 as part of the Sarra Triangle by the Anglo-Egyptian Condominium, who considered the area worthless and so an act of cheap appeasement to Benito Mussolini's attempts at empire. The Italians built a First World War–style fort in El Tag in the mid-1930s.

== Administrative capital Hun ==
During the colonial Italian Libya period, Hun was the administrative capital of the Italian Fezzan region, called Territorio Militare del Sud. Hun was the Italian military center of southern Italian Libya, and was not part of the national Fourth Shore territory of the Kingdom of Italy as Italian Tripolitania and Italian Cyrenaica were.

A small Libyan Italian community of 1,156 people lived in Hun, which was called Homs in the colonial years. In the 1939 census they were 3% of the total population of 35,316 in the city. They disappeared from Homs after Italy's loss of Libya in World War II.

In the 1930s the Italian government made some important improvements to the small town, including a connection to the coast via the new Fezzan Road.

Small Italian communities, mostly related to the military servicemen, lived even in Ghadames and Ghat. Some of them were related to the Auto-Saharan Company ("Compagnie Auto-Avio-Sahariane"), Italian military units specialised in long range patrols of the Sahara Desert and headquartered in Homs.

== World War II ==
The Military Territory of the South was occupied by the Allies during the Second World War. The French invaded from Chad and occupied Fezzan-Ghadames, the western part of the Military Territory of the South, in 1943. The British occupied the rest of Libya, including the other half of the territory which became part of Cyrenaica.

== Demographics ==
According to the 1936 census, which allowed local citizens to declare their ethnicity, Libyan Sahara's native population was made up of 55.7% Arabs, 21.8% black Africans, 14.1% Berbers, 6.9% Turks and 1.5% Others.

== See also ==
- Italian Libya
- Aozou Strip
- Italian North Africa
