= Derna Province =

Province of Libya under Italian rule

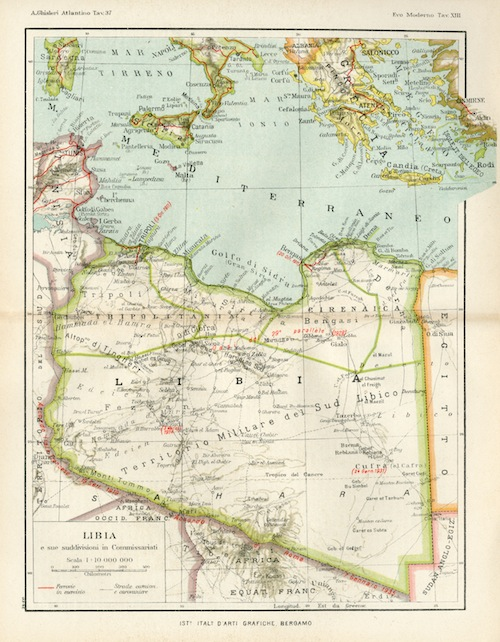
Map showing the "Provincia di Derna" in 1939 Italian Libya

Darnah Province (called in Italian Provincia italiana di Derna) was one of the provinces of Libya under Italian rule. It was established in 1937 with the official name: "Commissariato Generale Provinciale di Derna". Derna province was called only "Darnah District" after World War II.

== Characteristics ==
Derna province was located in northern Italian Libya, next to Egypt. It was a semi-arid area near the Mediterranean coast, with a fertile plateau around ancient Cyrene, but in the interior was the Sahara desert. Its administrative center was the small city of Derna on the Mediterranean coast.

It was divided in 3 "circondari" (sections):

- Derna
- Apollonia
- Tobruk

The province from 1939 was considered officially part of the Kingdom of Italy, with the same laws. It was one of the four new Italian provinces of the so-called Quarta Sponda (Fourth Shore). Indeed, on 9 January 1939, the coastal portions of the colony of Italian Libya was incorporated into "metropolitan Italy" and thereafter considered an integral part of the Italian state itself (the French, in 1848, had incorporated French Algeria in the same manner).

In the coast of the province was built in 1937-1938 the eastern section of the Litoranea Balbia, that went from Tripoli to the border of Egypt. Some Italian colonists moved to live in a group of new villages after 1938: they increased local agricultural production, but British invasion during World War II destroyed all improvements.

The car tag for the Italian province of Derna was DE.

== Population in Province of Derna ==
According to the 1936 census, which allowed citizens to declare their ethnicity, Derna's native population was made up of 94.4% Arabs, 1.8% Turks, 0.7% Blacks, 0.2% Berbers, and 2.9% Others.

According to the 1939 Italian Census of Libya, these were the main population data:

CITY	INHABITANTS	ITALIANS	NOTES
Beda Littoria	16.238 pop.	1.533	Italians nearly 9,5%
Cyrene	494 pop.	222	Italians nearly 45%
Bardia	5,491 pop.	216	Italians nearly 4%; it was even called "Porto Bardia"
Derna	16,609 pop.	3,250	Italians 20%
Tobruk	11,284 pop.	1,756	Italians nearly 16%
Giarabub	215 pop.	-	oasis with military garrison
Apollonia	3,313 pop.	449	Italians 14%

== See also ==
- Tripoli Province
- Benghazi Province
- Misurata Province (Italian Libya)
- Military Territory of the South (Italian Libya)
- Italian Libya
- Fourth Shore
- Via Balbia
