= Italian imperialism under fascism =

Aspect of politics in Fascist Italy

Imperialism, colonialism and irredentism played an important role in the foreign policy of Fascist Italy. These included both ethnic-nationalist irredentist claims and frivolous foreign adventures intended to artificially raise the regime’s prestige. Among the regime's goals were the acquisition of territory considered historically Italian in France (e.g. Nice) and Yugoslavia (e.g. Dalmatia), the expansion of Italy's sphere of influence into the Balkans (e.g. Greece) and the acquisition of more colonies in Africa. The pacification of Libya (1923–32), the invasion of Ethiopia (1935–36), the invasion of Albania (1939), the invasion of France (1940), the invasion of Greece (1940–41) and the invasion of Yugoslavia (1941) were all undertaken in part to add to Italy's national space. According to historian Patrick Bernhard, Fascist Italian imperialism under Benito Mussolini, particularly in Africa, served as a model for the much more famous expansionism of Nazi Germany in Eastern Europe.

== East Africa ==
Italy had colonial interests ever since 1869 when an Italian trading firm founded an outpost at Massawa in what is now Eritrea. The Italian colonial possessions of Eritrea and Somaliland came to be recognised during the Scramble for Africa, but expansion into the interior of the Horn of Africa was blocked by the Ethiopian Empire of Menelik II at the Battle of Adwa in 1896, where he resoundingly defeated Italian forces sent to enforce a deliberate mistranslation of acceptance of effective protectorate status by Ethiopia, that Italy had maliciously included only in the Italian draft of the treaty in an attempt to unilaterally determine Ethiopia’s status. The resulting fallout in Italy removed prime minister Francesco Crispi from power and resulted in riots.

Since the defeat, Italy had accepted Ethiopian sovereignty and the regional status quo. However, it remained a sore spot that rankled Italian militarists and jingoistic demagogues in particular, of which there was no shortage following the political crisis at the end of the First World War. The fascist regime initially respected the status quo, as set forth in a 1928 treaty with Ethiopia, but from the early 1930s began to challenge it.

A series of border posts were established by the Italians well inside Ethiopian territory, and an Ethiopian contingent with British observers was fired upon by Italians at Wal Wal in December 1934, beginning a series of military preparations that escalated into full scale invasion in October 1935.

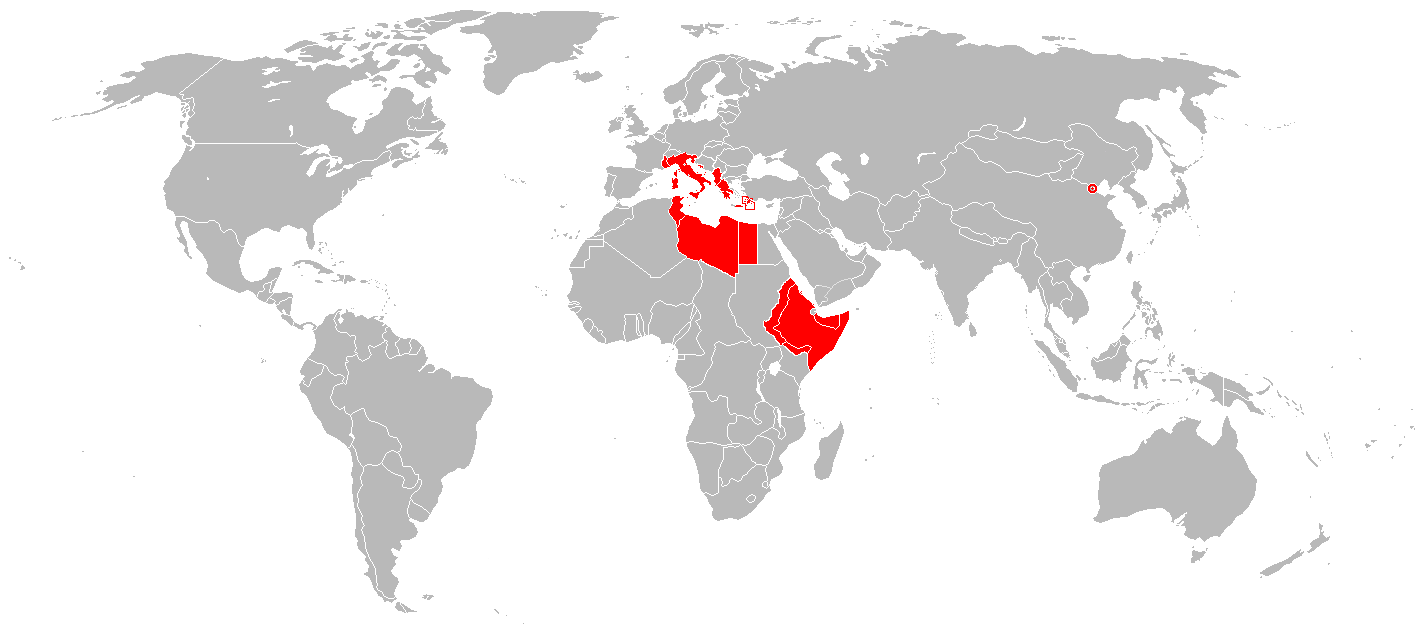
The Italian empire at greatest extent, c. 1942.

The war initially stalemated despite the might of the modernised Italian army and resorting to gas bombing of civilians and medical facilities, turning it into a matter of pride for the fascist regime, whose rapidly draining coffers obliged the request to Italian women to donate their gold wedding bands to fund the invasion, as Italian obtuseness defied international opinion to transgress against a fellow sovereign state. A renewed offensive of Spring 1936 led to the fall of Addis Ababa and the fusion of the Italian colonies with Ethiopia as Africa Orientale Italiana (AOI). King Victor Emmanuel III was proclaimed Emperor of Ethiopia in a lacklustre imitation of the British monarch’s title of Emperor of India.

Unlike in British India, however, rule of law was almost entirely fiction in Italian East Africa, where Italian-native relations were governed in the context of a soon to be established racial hierarchy, and institutionalised terror like the Yekatit 12 massacre in 1937 after an assassination attempt on the viceroy, an enthusiastic proponent of ethnic cleansing in Libya, Rodolfo Graziani. Italian international isolation after Anglo-French attempts to appease Italy with a portion of Ethiopia before Ethiopia’s total conquest were leaked to the press and withdrawn after public outcry, were compensated by the Italian government falling voluntarily into the arms of Nazi Germany with the Rome-Berlin Axis of 1936, signed by a new pro-German foreign minister Galeazzo Ciano that would ultimately bind the fascist regime to its belligerent neighbour and destroy it.

The so called “pearl of the fascist empire” lasted only five years as following Italy’s declaration of war on the Allies of the 10th of June 1940, despite initial successes in occupying British Somaliland, Italian East Africa was conquered in a highly successful Allied campaign led by British Commonwealth forces, with Free French and Ethiopian resistance forces playing major supporting roles, which led to the Duca d’Aosta’s surrender of the territory in May 1941. Similar Italian underperformances in Greece, North Africa and later metropolitan Italy itself would lead to Winston Churchill quipping that Italy was the “soft underbelly” of the Axis; although contemporary sources indicate that this phrase was never used by Churchill in writing, and indeed was deemed inaccurate by General Mark Clark, who indeed described Italy as "a tough old gut".

The former Ras Tafari Haile Selassie I was restored to his throne by the British, who occupied the former Italian colonies until the end of the war, when Eritrea was granted to Ethiopia in 1952 and Somaliland was permitted to become a Trust Territory of Italy under condition of a ten year limit for independence in 1949, which Somalia became on 1 January 1960, uniting with British Somaliland. Thus ended the indecorous comportment of Italian imperial rule in East Africa, overextended by a belligerent fascist regime in a vainglorious quest for parity with the empires of Britain and France.

== Greater Italy ==
After his appointment as Governor of the Dodecanese in 1936, the fascist leader Cesare Maria De Vecchi started to promote within Benito Mussolini's National Fascist Party an idea of a new "Imperial Italy" (Italian: Italia imperiale), one that, like a recreation of the Roman Empire, went beyond Europe and included northern Africa (the Fourth Shore or "Quarta Sponda" in Italian).

De Vecchi's dream was an Imperial Italy that included not only all the European territories wanted by the Italian irredentists (Nice, Savoy, Ticino, Dalmatia, Corfu, Malta and Corsica) and populated by Italian communities for many centuries, but even the north African territories (Libya and Tunisia), where Italian emigrants had created "colonies" in the late nineteenth century.

After 1936 and during World War II, the Greek Dodecanese islands were also included in the project (with the Ionian islands of Zante, Ithaca, etc.) and the fascist regime soon promoted a process of forced Italianization of these Greek islands.

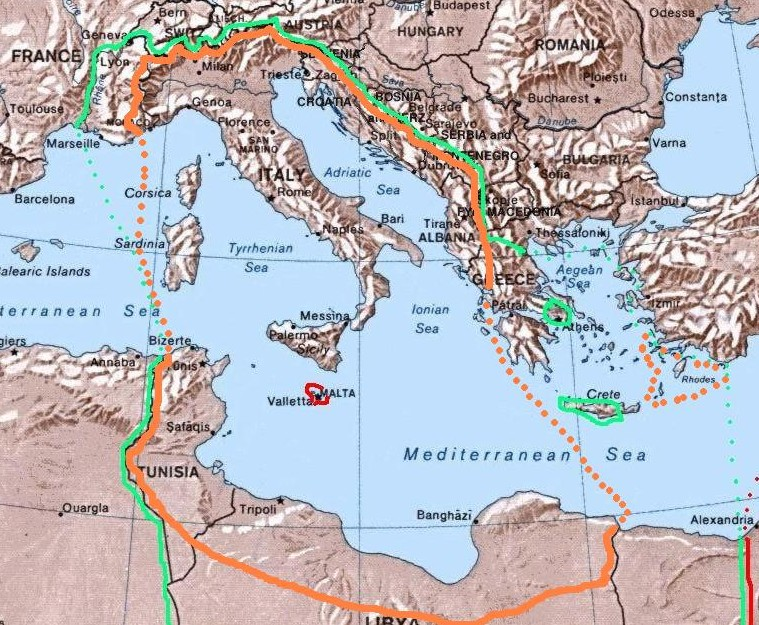
The Greater Italy in 1941/1942, with the united to Italy provinces in Italian Libya (and the controlled areas in the Balkans and in France)

Italy annexed the coastal provinces of its colony of Libya in 1938 and made them national provinces of Italy that were to be Italianized.

In preparation for war with France in 1940, the Fascist regime intended to gain Corsica, Nice, Savoy, and the colonies of Tunisia and Djibouti from France. Foreign Minister Count Ciano on 10 June 1940 issued support for the partition of Switzerland between Germany and Italy, with Italy annexing Ticino, Grisons, and Valais.

The opinions of De Vecchi were partially accepted by Mussolini in the 1940s, when Italy entered World War II, but found opposition (and scepticism) in the King of Italy, Victor Emmanuel III. In November 1942, with the Italian occupation of more of southern France following the occupation of the free zone under rule of the Vichy regime, and Corsica, as well as enlargements of Italy proper in Slovenia and for Italian Albania in 1941 in what is now Montenegro, Kosovo and North Macedonia with the partition of Yugoslavia between the Axis powers, the territories of the "Imperial Italy" dreamed of by the fascist De Vecchi were fully in Italian hands, with the exception of Malta, but the project was not politically implemented because the war was turning against the Axis powers. In July 1943, Mussolini was deposed by a vote of no confidence in his own Grand Fascist Council and that September, Germany invaded Italy (code named ironically Operation Axis) and annexed South Tyrol, Slovenia, Venezia and Istria while setting up a puppet regime, the Salo Republic, and taking over the former Italian occupations in France and Albania.

== The Dodecanese ==
De Vecchi effected the first step towards an Italia Imperiale (or Grande Italia) when in 1936, as Italian Governor of the Dodecanese islands, he imposed official use of the Italian language and created a colony of 7,000 Italians in Rhodes and surrounding islands. In 1940 he was appointed to the Grand Council of Fascism where later, during the Italian occupation of Greece, he proposed that the Kingdom of Italy annex the Dodecanese and Ionian islands, with the island of Chios, which had once belonged to the Republic of Genoa. Italy had taken advantage of the weakness of the Ottoman Empire to occupy the islands which were in the hands of the Turks in 1912. The islands were given to Greece in the 1947 Treaty of Peace.

== Libya ==
Italy had occupied Tripolitania and Cyrenaica during the Italo-Turkish War of 1911-12, along with the Dodecanese. It had been a target of Italian expansionists since French occupation of Tunisia in 1881 caused indignant expostulating from Italians who considered Tunisia rightfully in Italy’s sphere of influence. Since then, the interior had never been under Italian rule, and the opposition of the Senussi and other Libyan tribes under Omar Mukhtar led to perpetual clashes, with four military leaders being cycled through in a decade, and any Italian rule being fiction outside of the littoral cities and non-existent in Kufra until 1931, when Mukhtar was captured and executed.

Another fascist leader, aviator Italo Balbo, promoted actively the development of Italian communities in coastal Libya, after the country was pacified. Balbo called Tripolitania and Cyrenaica, joined in 1934 as a single colony renamed “Libya” in reference to antiquity, the Quarta Sponda (Fourth Shore) of Italy in reference to the other three shores (the western, the Adriatic and the Balkan) of the Italian peninsula.

One of the initial Italian objectives in Libya, indeed, had been the relief of overpopulation and unemployment in Italy through emigration to the undeveloped colony. With security established, systematic "demographic colonization" was encouraged by King Victor Emmanuel III's government. A project initiated by Libya's governor, Italo Balbo, brought the first 20,000 settlers — the "Ventimila" - to Libya in a single convoy in October 1938. More settlers followed in 1939, and by 1940 there were approximately 110,000 Italians in Libya, constituting about 12 percent of the total population.

Plans envisioned an Italian colony of 500,000 settlers by the 1960s: so, the Italians would be 2/3 of the population in coastal Libya by then. Libya's best land was allocated to the settlers to be brought under productive cultivation, primarily in olive groves. Settlement was directed by a state corporation, the "Libyan Colonization Society", which undertook land reclamation and the building of model villages and offered a grubstake and credit facilities to the settlers it had sponsored.

In November 1942, Tunisia was also included as the "Quarta Sponda" (with nearly 100,000 Tunisian Italians) in plans for Greater Italy, but a few months later following the Axis defeat at El Alamein and Rommel’s Afrika Korps’ retreat to Tunisia it was occupied by the Allies. Fezzan was occupied by the Free French, while Cyrenaica and Tripolitania were occupied the British, until Libya’s independence in 1951. Idris of Libya, the Emir of Emirate of Cyrenaica and a descendant of the Grand Senussi, became the King of Libya.

== The Western Balkans ==
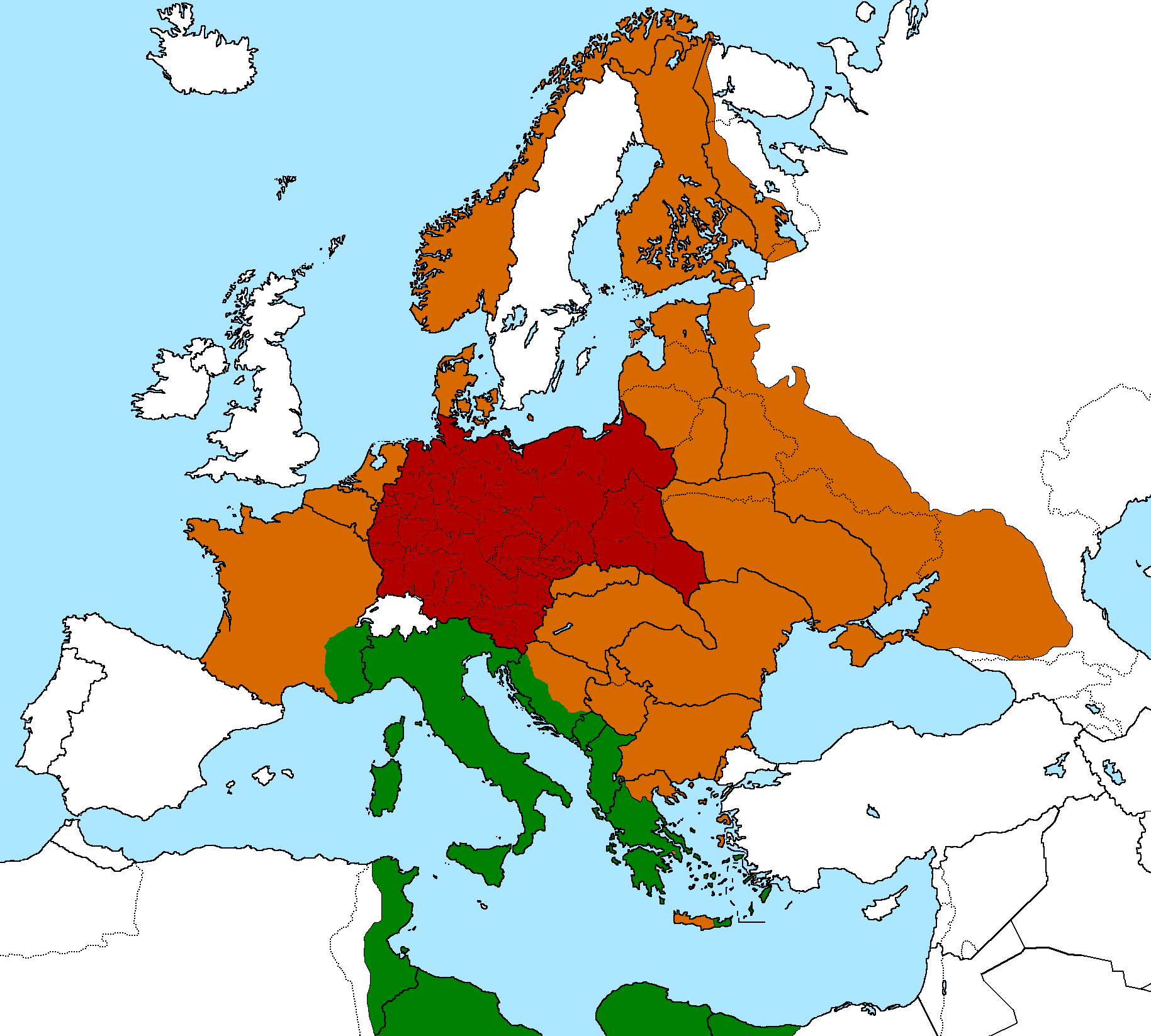
The Greater Italy in 1942 occupied areas of France, former Yugoslavia and Greece (in green). The map also shows the German Reich (red) and its occupied territories, with "Reichskommissariats" (brown)

In spring 1941, Mussolini - with the help of the German Army - finally defeated Greece and conquered coastal Yugoslavia.

General Vittorio Ambrosio, the commander of the Italian Army during the conquest of Yugoslav Dalmatia, created a military line of occupation from Ljubljana to northern Montenegro that successively was to be considered as the future border of the "Imperial Italy" ( the “Third Shore”, formerly occupied by Venetian colonies and claimed by Italy since the Treaty of London in 1915) in the Balkans. Within the borders to the south were included Montenegro, Greater Albania and Epirus.

De Vecchi promoted the inclusion of Corfu (with a significant community of the Corfiot Italians), the Ionian islands and the southern Aegean islands (once controlled by the Republic of Venice), in order to form an "arch" that stretched toward the Dodecanese, Lesvos and Chios (controlled by the Republic of Genoa).

== Additional proposals ==
In the 1940s, De Vecchi contemplated an "Imperial Italy" stretching from Europe to North Africa, made of the "Imperial Italy" (with an enlarged Italian Empire in eastern Africa, from the Egyptian shores on the Mediterranean to Somalia).

He dreamt of a powerful Italy enlarged:

- 1) in Europe, from Nice to the Governatorato di Dalmazia in Dalmatia and possibly Greater Albania (see map), the Ionian islands, the Principality of Pindus in Epirus (northern Greece), the Dodecanese.
- 2) in northern coastal Africa, from Tunisia to Libya (the Fezzan of Libya was to be considered a colony of the empire).

In a hopeful peace negotiation following an Axis victory, Mussolini had planned to acquire for his Imperial Italy the full island of Crete (that was mostly German occupied) and the surrounding southern Greek islands, connecting the Italian Dodecanese possessions to the already Italian Ionian islands.

South of the Fourth Shore, some fascist leaders dreamt of an Italian Empire that, starting in the Fezzan, would include Egypt, Sudan and reach Italian East Africa.

The Allied victory in the Second World War ended these projects and terminated all fascist ambitions for the empire.

Finally, in 1947 the Italian Republic formally relinquished sovereignty over all its overseas colonial possessions as a result of the Treaty of Peace with Italy. There were discussions to maintain Tripolitania (a province of Italian Libya) as the last Italian colony, but they were not successful.

In November 1949, the former Italian Somaliland, then under British military administration, was made a United Nations Trust Territory under Italian administration for a period of 10 years. On 1 July 1960, the Trust Territory of Somalia merged with British Somaliland to form the independent Somali Republic.

== See also ==
- Latin Axis (World War II)
