= Benghazi Province =

Former province of Libya

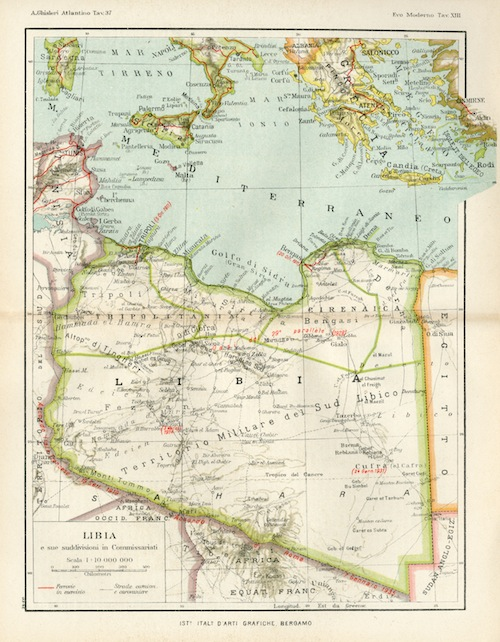
Benghazi Province, inside Italian Libya

Benghazi Province, or Provincia di Bengasi in Italian, was one of the provinces of Libya under Italian rule. It was established in 1937.

== Characteristics ==
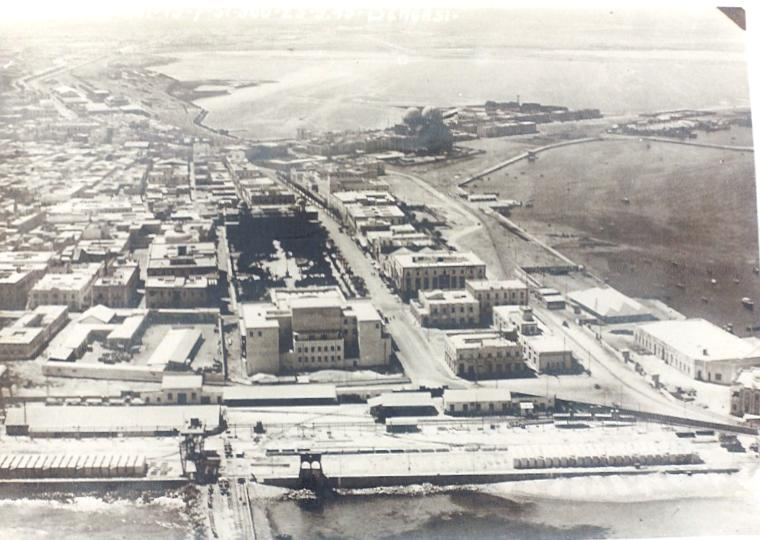
Italian Benghazi in 1940

Benghazi Province was located in northern Italian Libya, in western Cyrenaica. Its administrative center was the city of Benghazi on the Mediterranean coast.

It was divided in three sections ("Circondari" in Italian) called in Italian language:

- Bengasi
- Agedabia
- Barce

The Italians conquered from the Ottomans in 1911 a region around Benghazi that was very poor and underdeveloped: it had no asphalted road, no telegraph services, no sewage systems, and no hospitals (in 1874 Benghazi had been depopulated by the bubonic plague). In ten years they built all these infrastructures and by the early 1930s a new port and airport and a railways station were created in Benghazi. Indeed in those years in Benghazi were created -for the first time in Cyrenaica's History- the first manufacturing industries, that included salt processing, oil refining, food processing, cement manufacturing, tanning, brewing and sponge and tuna fishing.

In the 1920s in the Benghazi province was created a railway between Benghazi (called Bengasi in Italian) and Barce: a 750 mm (2 ft 5 1/2 in) (later 950 mm) gauge railway was built east from Benghazi; the main route was 110 kilometres (68 mi) long to Marj and was opened in stages between 1911 and 1927. Benghazi also had a 56 kilometres (35 mi) branch to Suluq opened in 1926.

In the late 1930s in the Benghazi province were settled thousands of Italians as farmers in special villages. Most of the Italians were concentrated in Italian Benghazi, where they were in 1939 nearly one third of the population.

According to the 1939 Census Benghazi had 66,801 inhabitants, of whom 23,075 were Italians.

In the late 1930s the province had a huge economic development, mainly in agriculture and commerce, but World War II destroyed it.

== Demographics ==
According to the 1936 census, which allowed citizens to declare their ethnicity, Benghazi's native population was made up of 95.8% Arabs, 0.3% Turks, 0.3% Blacks, 0.2% Berbers, and 3.6% Others.

== Bibliography ==
- Capresi, Vittoria. I centri rurali libici. L´architettura dei centri rurali di fondazione costruiti in Libia – colonia italiana – durante il fascismo (1934-1940). Vienna University of Technology. Vienna, 2007
- Chapin Metz, Helen, ed., Libya: A Country Study. Washington: GPO for the Library of Congress, 1987
- Guida d'Italia del TCI. Possedimenti e colonie Edizioni Touring Club. Milano, 1929

== See also ==
- Tripoli Province
- Derna Province
- Misurata Province
- Territorio Sahara Libico
- Italian Libya
- Benghazi
- Italian Benghazi
- Benghazi Governorate
- Italian Cyrenaica
