= Italian Tripolitania =

1911–1934 Italian possession in North Africa

Italian Tripolitania Tripolitania Italiana (Italian) طرابلس الإيطالية (Arabic)
- 1911–1934
- Flag Coat of arms

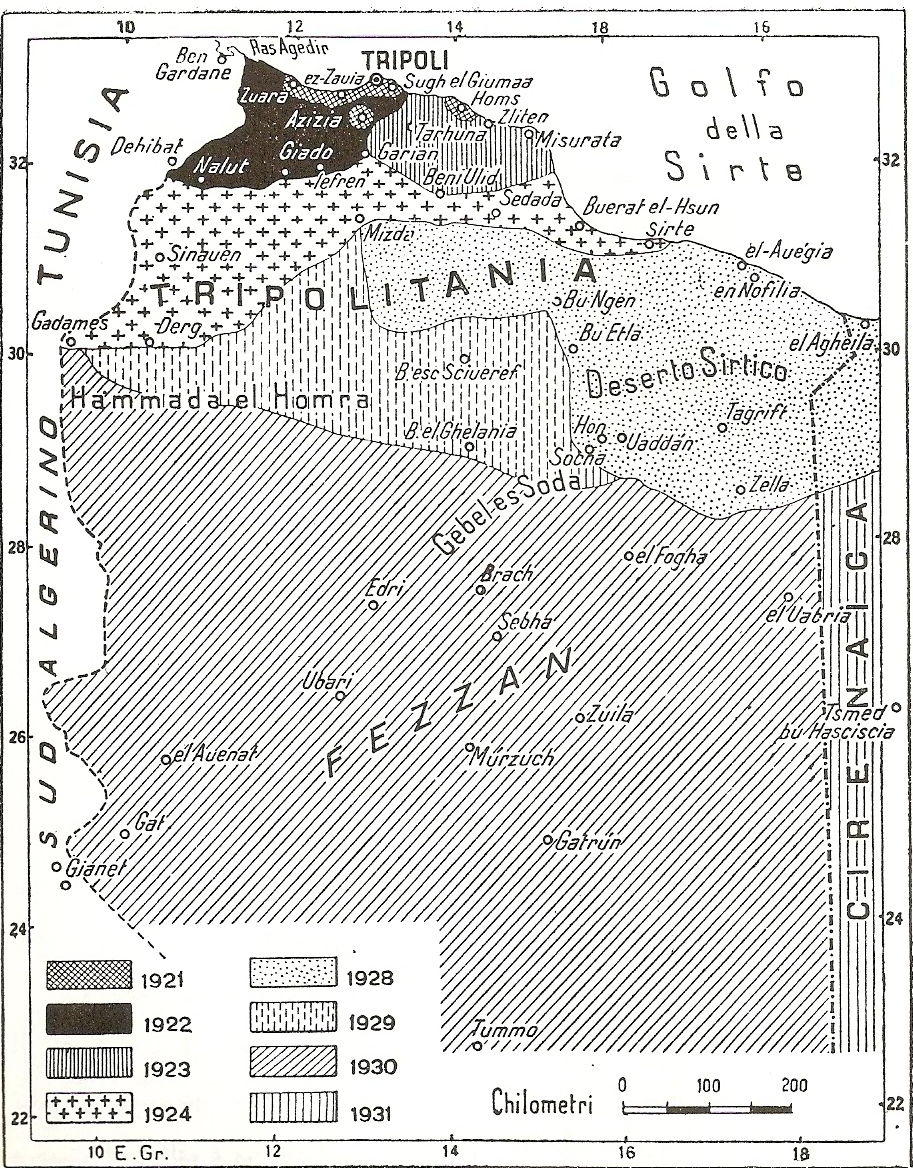
- Status: Colony of the Kingdom of Italy
- Capital: Tripoli
- Common languages: Italian; Arabic
- Religion: Islam; Roman Catholicism
- Monarch
  - 1911–1934: Victor Emmanuel III
- Governor
  - 1911 (first): R.B.R. d'Olmo
  - 1928–1934 (last): Pietro Badoglio
- Historical era: Interwar period
  - Occupation of Tripoli: 5 October 1911
  - Italian sovereignty: 5 November 1911
  - Ottoman withdrawal: 18 October 1912
  - Tripolitania colony: 12 November 1922
  - Part of Italian Libya: 1 January 1934
- Currency: Italian lira
Preceded by
Ottoman Tripolitania
Tripolitanian Republic
Kel Ajjer
Succeeded by
Italian Libya
- Today part of: Libya

Italian Tripolitania was an Italian colony, located in present-day western Libya, that existed from 1911 to 1934. It was part of the territory conquered from the Ottoman Empire after the Italo-Turkish War in 1911. Italian Tripolitania included the western northern half of Libya, with Tripoli as its main city. In 1934, it was unified with Italian Cyrenaica in the colony of Italian Libya. In 1939, Tripolitania was considered a part of the Kingdom of Italy's 4th Shore.

Although resistance to the Italian colonisers was less prevalent in Tripolitania than Cyrenaica (which waged significant guerilla warfare), a resistance group did form the Tripolitanian Republic in 1918. Although it didn't succeed in setting up a republic, it demonstrated attempts to resist colonial control. The Italian colonisers set up various infrastructure projects, most notably roads and railways. Archeology was another important feature of the Italian presence in Tripolitania, as they focused efforts in excavations in old Roman cities.

A significant number of Italian settlers moved to Tripolitania, particularly to Tripoli, and Italian presence was still felt long after the decolonisation process began.

== History ==
=== Conquest and colonization ===
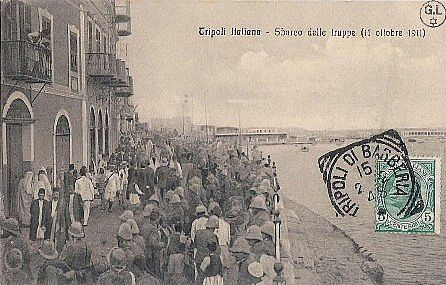
Italian Army landing at the Port of Tripoli, 11 October 1911.

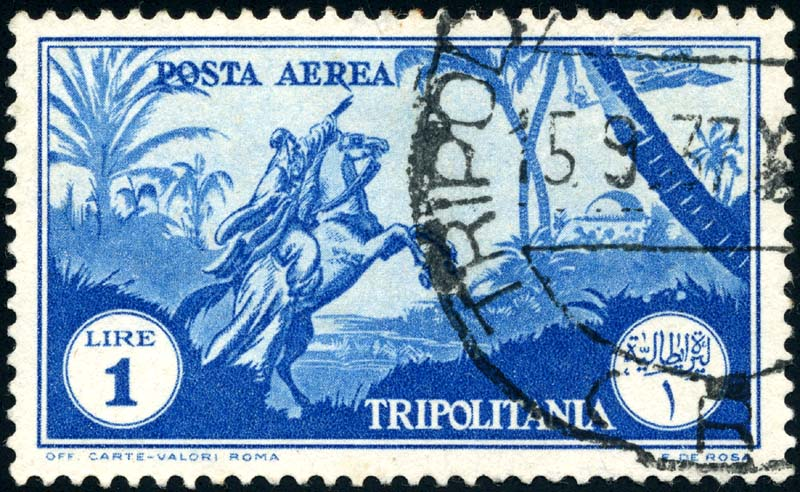
A 1-lire airmail stamp, depicting an Arab horseman pointing to an airplane passing overhead.

Italian Tripolitania and Italian Cyrenaica were formed in 1911, during the conquest of Ottoman Tripolitania in the Italo-Turkish War.

The Ottoman Empire agreed to evacuate Tripolitania and Cyrenaica under the Treaty of Lausanne, signed on 18 October 1912. The Italians made extensive use of the Savari, colonial cavalry troops raised in December 1912. These units were recruited from the Arab-Berber population of Libya following the initial Italian occupation in 1911–12. The Savari, like the Spahi or mounted Libyan police, formed part of the Regio Corpo Truppe Coloniali della Libia (Royal Corps of Libyan Colonial Troops).

The memoirs of Francesco Crispi states the discussion of Tripoli during the Congress of Berlin. The discussion was halted as it was not a priority, however Italy's attention in the congress was focused on Tripoli. Their expansion into Tripoli, which they believed was their right, was reluctantly accepted by other European Powers. The Italian occupation of Tripoli was mentioned within the Italian press during the following years, Tripolitania was expecting Italian arrival.

Sheikh Sidi Idris al-Mahdi as-Senussi (later King Idris I), of the Senussi, led Libyan resistance in various forms through the outbreak of the Second World War. After the Italian army invaded Cyrenaica in 1913 as part of their invasion of Libya, the Senussi Order fought back against them. When the Order's leader, Ahmed Sharif as-Senussi, abdicated his position, he was replaced by Idris, who was his cousin. Pressured to do so by the Ottoman Empire, Ahmed had pursued armed attacks against British military forces stationed in neighbouring Egypt. On taking power, Idris put a stop to these attacks.

Instead he established a tacit alliance with the British, which would last for half a century and accord his Order de facto diplomatic status. Using the British as intermediaries, Idris led the Order into negotiations with the Italians in July 1916. These resulted in two agreements, at al-Zuwaytina in April 1916 and at Akrama in April 1917. The latter of these treaties left most of inland Cyrenaica under the control of the Senussi Order. Relations between the Senussi Order and the newly established Tripolitanian Republic were acrimonious. The Senussi attempted to militarily extend their power into eastern Tripolitania, resulting in a pitched battle at Bani Walid in which the Senussi were forced to withdraw back into Cyrenaica.

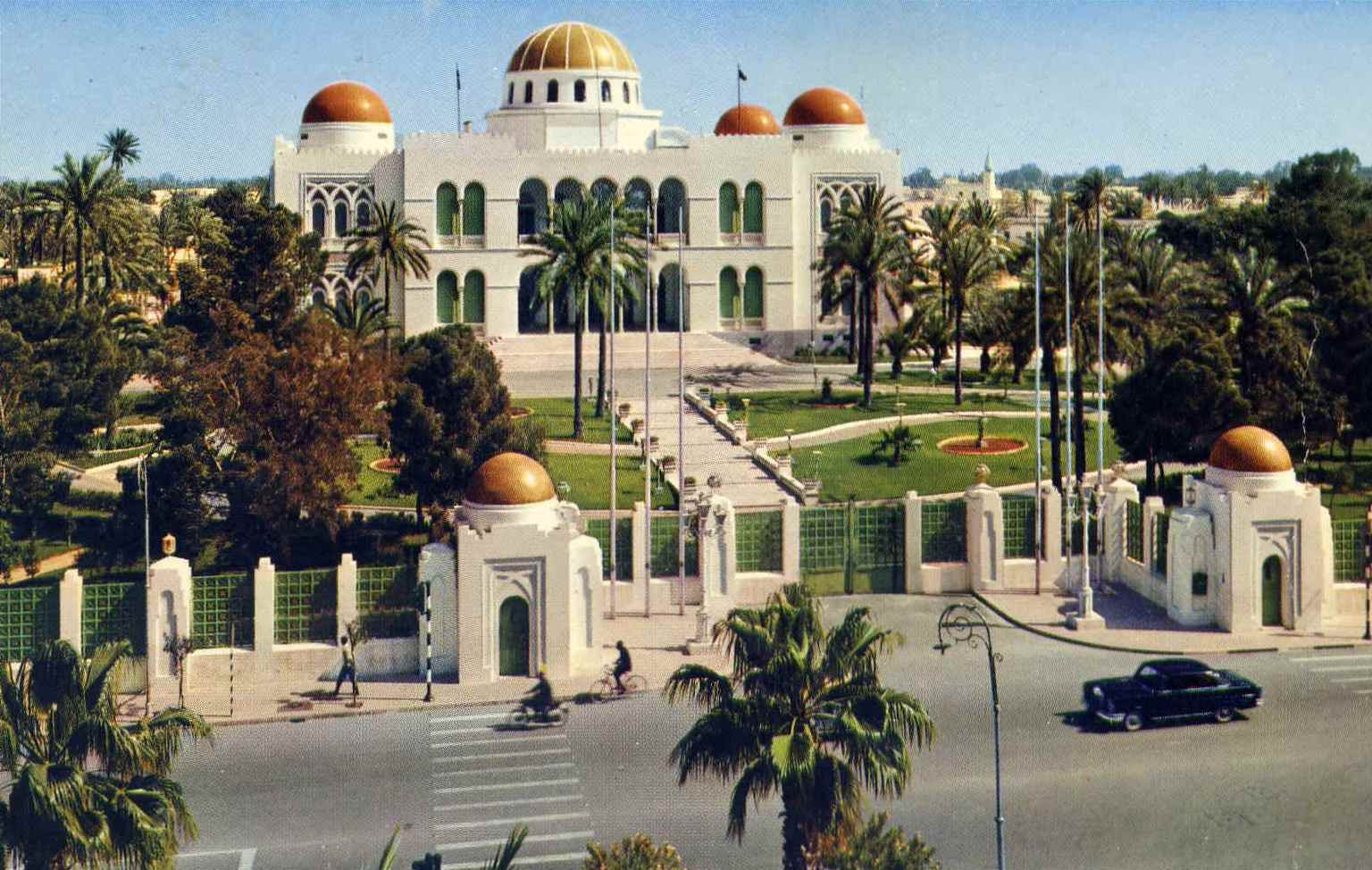
The Royal Palace of Tripoli, designed by Italian colonial architect Meraviglia-Mantegazza in 1924.

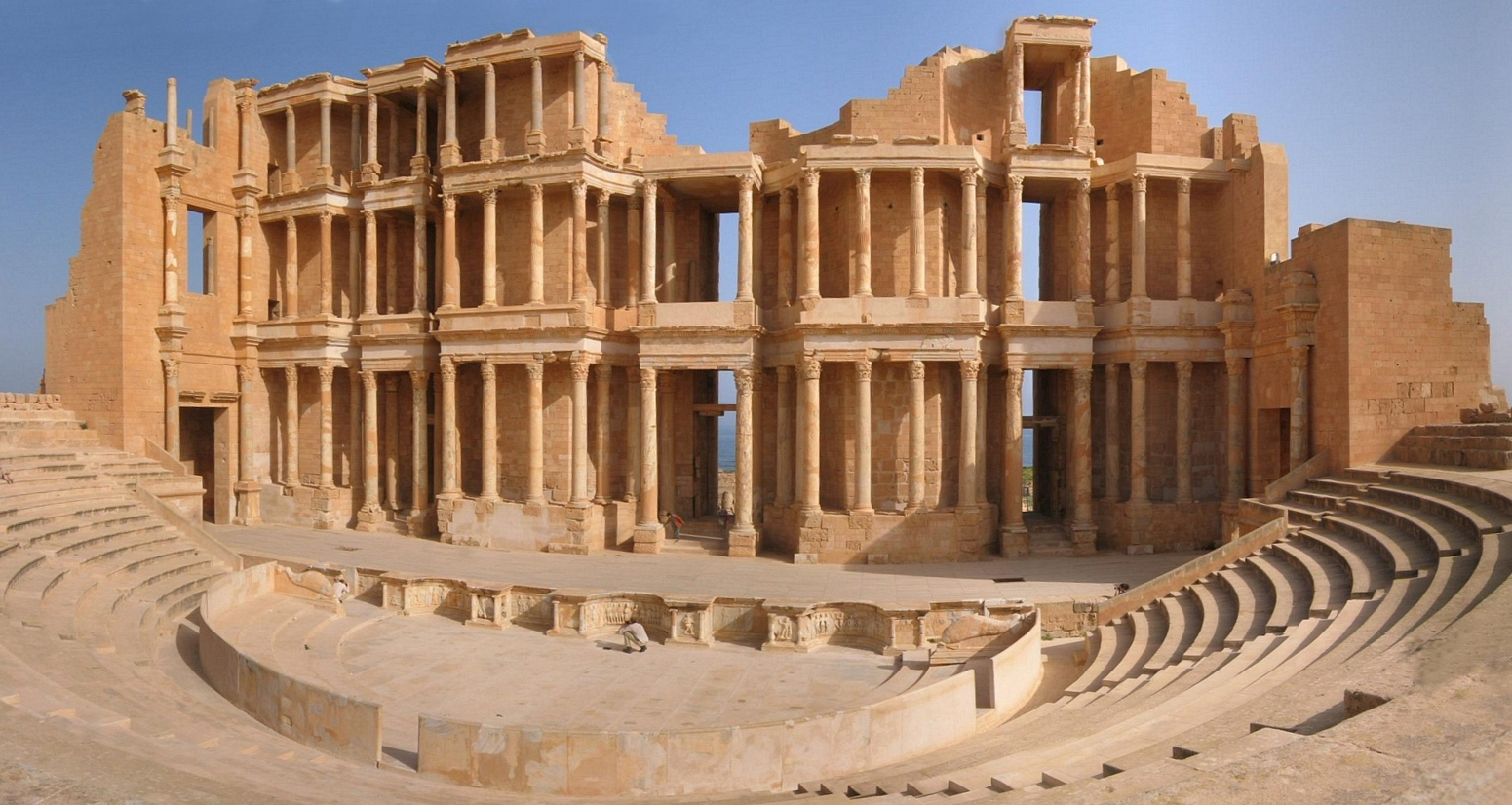
Roman theatre of Sabratha, restored during the Italian rule

At the end of World War I, the Ottoman Empire signed an armistice agreement in which they ceded their claims over Libya to Italy. Italy however was facing serious economic, social, and political problems domestically, and was not prepared to re-launch its military activities in Libya. It issued statutes known as the Legge Fondamentale with both the Tripolitanian Republic in June 1919 and Cyrenaica in October 1919. These brought about a compromise by which all Libyans were accorded the right to a joint Libyan-Italian citizenship while each province was to have its own parliament and governing council. The Senussi were largely happy with this arrangement and Idris visited Rome as part of the celebrations to mark the promulgation of the settlement.

In October 1920, further negotiations between Italy and Cyrenaica resulted in the Accord of al-Rajma, in which Idris was given the title of the Emir of Cyrenaica and permitted to autonomously administer the oases around Kufra, Jalu, Jaghbub, Awjila, and Ajdabiya. As part of the Accord he was given a monthly stipend by the Italian government, who agreed to take responsibility for policing and administration of areas under Senussi control. The Accord also stipulated that Idris must fulfill the requirements of the Legge Fondamentale by disbanding the Cyrenaican military units, however he did not comply with this. By the end of 1921, relations between the Senussi Order and the Italian government had again deteriorated.

Following the death of Tripolitanian leader Ramadan Asswehly in August 1920, the Republic descended into civil war. Many tribal leaders in the region recognised that this discord was weakening the region's chances of attaining full autonomy from Italy, and in November 1920 they met in Gharyan to bring an end to the violence. In January 1922 they agreed to request that Idris extend the Sanui Emirate of Cyrenaica into Tripolitania in order to bring stability; they presented a formal document with this request on 28 July 1922. Idris' advisers were divided on whether he should accept the offer or not. Doing so would contravene the al-Rajma Agreement and would damage relations with the Italian government, who opposed the political unification of Cyrenaica and Tripolitania as being against their interests. Nevertheless, in November 1922 Idris agreed to the proposal. Following the agreement, Idris feared that Italy — under its new Fascist leader Benito Mussolini—would militarily retaliate against the Senussi Order, and so he went into exile in Egypt in December 1922.

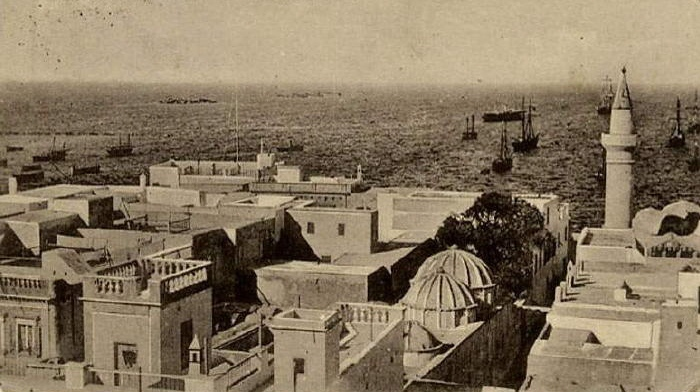
Medina quarter of Tripoli in 1920s

Fighting intensified after the accession to power in Italy of the dictator Benito Mussolini. Due to the effective resistance of the Libyan people against Italy's so-called "pacification campaign", Italian colonization of the Ottoman provinces of Tripolitania and Cyrenaica was not initially successful and it was not until the early 1930s that the Kingdom of Italy took full control of the area.

Several reorganizations of the colonial authority had been made necessary because of armed Arab opposition, mainly in Cyrenaica. Between 1919 (17 May) to 1929 (24 January), the Italian government maintained the two traditional provinces, with separate colonial administrations. A system of controlled local assemblies with limited local authority was set up, but was revoked on 9 March 1927. In 1929, Tripoli and Cyrenaica were united as one colonial province. From 1931 to 1932, Italian forces under General Badoglio waged a punitive pacification campaign. Badoglio's successor in the field, General Rodolfo Graziani, accepted the commission from Mussolini on the condition that he was allowed to crush Libyan resistance unencumbered by the restraints of either Italian or international law. Mussolini reportedly agreed immediately and Graziani intensified the oppression.

Some Libyans continued to defend themselves, with the strongest voices of dissent coming from the Cyrenaica. Beginning in the first days of Italian colonization, Omar Mukhtar, a Senussi sheikh, organized and, for nearly twenty years, led Libyan resistance efforts. His example continued to inspire resistance even after his capture and execution on 16 September 1931. His face is currently printed on the Libyan ten dinar note in memory and recognition of his patriotism.

By 1934, Libyan indigenous resistance was effectively crushed. The new Italian governor Italo Balbo created the political entity called Italian Libya in the summer of that year. (Note: Helen Chapin Metz wrote in her book Libya: A Country Study: "Once pacification had been accomplished, fascist Italy endeavoured to convert Libya into an Italian province to be referred to popularly as Italy's Fourth Shore. In 1934 Tripolitania and Cyrenaica were divided into four provinces—Tripoli, Misrata, Benghazi, and Darnah—which were formally linked as a single colony known as Libya, thus officially resurrecting the name that Diocletian had applied nearly 1,500 years earlier. Fezzan, designated as South Tripolitania, remained a military territory. A governor general, called the first consul after 1937, was in overall direction of the colony, assisted by the General Consultative Council, on which Arabs were represented. Traditional tribal councils, formerly sanctioned by the Italian administration, were abolished, and all local officials were thereafter appointed by the governor general. Administrative posts at all levels were held by Italians.An accord with Britain and Egypt obtained the transfer of a corner of the Anglo-Egyptian Sudan, known as the Sarra Triangle, to Italian control in 1934. The next year, a French-Italian agreement was negotiated that relocated the 1,000-kilometer border between Libya and Chad southward about 100 kilometers across the Aouzou Strip, but this territorial concession to Italy was never ratified by the French legislature. In 1939 Libya was incorporated into metropolitan Italy. During the 1930s, impressive strides were made in improving the country's economic and transportation infrastructure. Italy invested capital and technology in public works projects, extension and modernization of cities, highway and railroad construction, expanded port facilities, and irrigation, but these measures were introduced to benefit the Italian-controlled modern sector of the economy. Italian development policy after World War I had called for capital-intensive "economic colonization" intended to promote the maximum exploitation of the resources available. One of the initial Italian objectives in Libya, however, had been the relief of overpopulation and unemployment in Italy through emigration to the undeveloped colony. With security established, systematic "demographic colonization" was encouraged by Mussolini's government. A project initiated by Libya's governor, Italo Balbo, brought the first 20,000 settlers--the ventimilli--to Libya in a single convoy in October 1938. More settlers followed in 1939, and by 1940 there were approximately 110,000 Italians in Libya, constituting about 12 percent of the total population. Plans envisioned an Italian colony of 500,000 settlers by the 1960s. Libya's best land was allocated to the settlers to be brought under productive cultivation, primarily in olive groves. Settlement was directed by a state corporation, the Libyan Colonization Society, which undertook land reclamation and the building of model villages and offered a grubstake and credit facilities to the settlers it had sponsored. The Italians made modern medical care available for the first time in Libya, improved sanitary conditions in the towns, and undertook to replenish the herds and flocks that had been depleted during the war. But, although Mussolini liked to refer to the Libyans as "Muslim Italians," little more was accomplished that directly improved the living standards of the Arab population.") The classical name "Libya" was revived as the official name of the unified colony. Then in 1937 the colony was split administratively into four provinces: Tripoli, Misrata, Benghazi, and Derna. The Fezzan area was called Territorio Sahara Libico and administered militarily."

=== Resistance ===
The Italian Fascist Party came to power in 1922, it was agreed that fraternising with local Libyan Leaders was a failure of the previous colonial practice. Instead, the fascists opted for to 'pacify' the local population. Their ideas was based upon racial supremacy and Social Darwinism. The belief in a hierarchy of races meant that the Italians therefore had a 'duty' to colonise African nations. This led to the subjugation of Libyans, as policies before 1922 were dismissed, such as the colonial official's push to "Italianise" its colony's education. For example, they censored Italian culture from the native population, banned education after the sixth grade and terminated teaching Italian in classrooms, replacing it with Arabic. Libyans were only allowed to work as Labourers. The banning of Italian in class was with the intention to 'protect' Italian culture, and exclude Libyans.

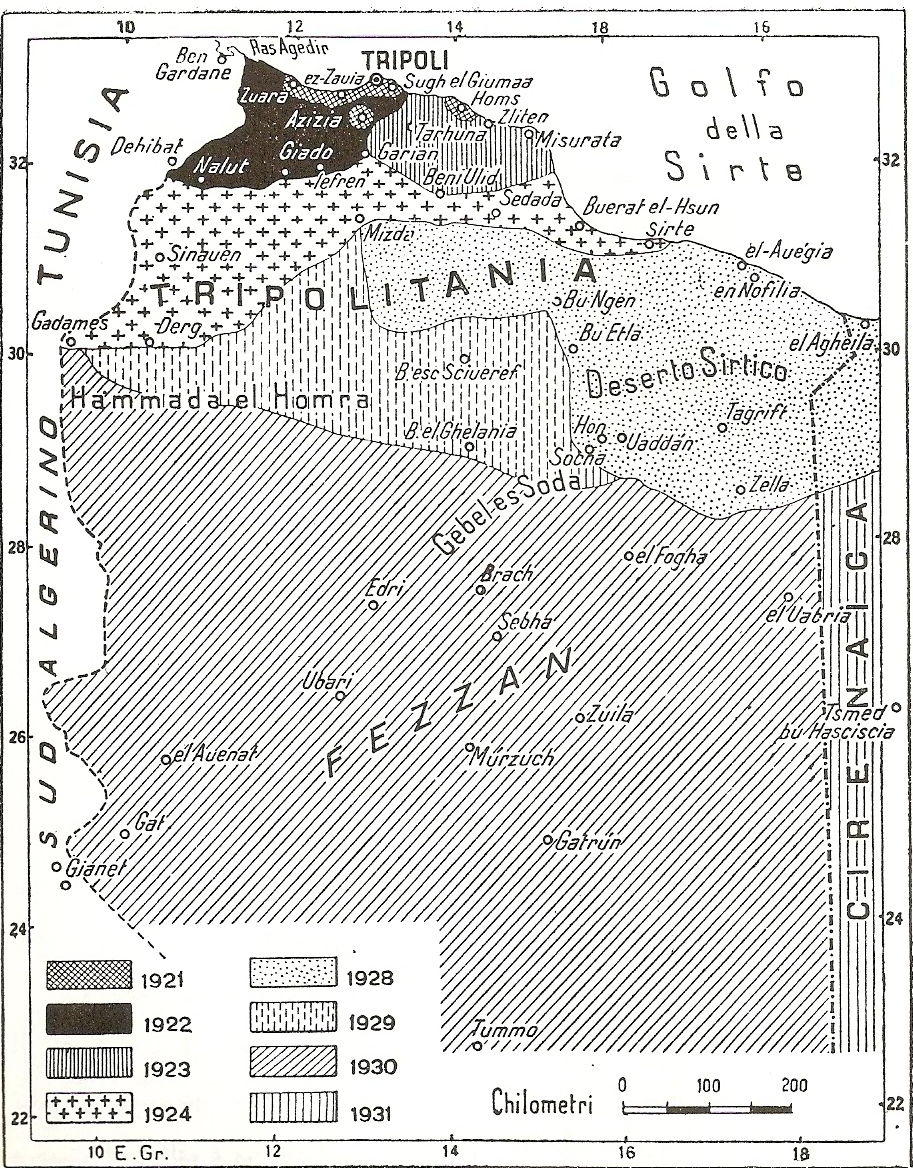
Pacification of Tripolitania and Fezzan

Benito Mussolini gave General Rodolfo Graziani responsibility for the pacification of Libya, due to previous success in the reoccupation of Tripolitania and Fezzan. Tripolitanian resistance was not as substantial, as various tribes cooperated with Italians. However, Graziani saw Cyrenaica as a problem due to the united force of Cyrenaican tribesmen and merchants. As well as 70 years worth of gathering with the religious and social movement, Sanusiyya. As a consequence they were able to forge a unified front that shared an anti-colonial, pan-Islamic ideology that successfully resisted colonialism.

Guerrilla warfare in 1924, by Shaykh Rida, brother of Sayyid Idris, was able to contain Italians, with a force of 2,00 to 6,000 tribesmen. In December 1925, an agreement between Great Britain cemented Italy's jurisdiction on Jaghbub and Kufra.This made guerrilla attacks more tortuous, as Italians established control by making it impossible for Rida to attack. The Italians did this by constructing fences across the border and patrolling with aircraft and cars. Shaykh Rida was arrested in January 1928 and exiled to Sicily.

The resistance was later led by 'Umar Al-Mukhtar. The Al-Mukhtar resistance notably included a network of spies in Italian enforced towns. It was estimated by Graziani that the native guerrillas numbered around 3.000 and they owned about 20,000 guns. Al-Mukhtar and the Cyrenacians had advantages over the Italians as they knew the terrain, and used the mountains and trails as a trump card. In 1931, Al-Mukhtar engaged in 250 attacks with the Italian army, Italian officials attempted to bribe 'Umar al-Mukhtar, with salary and retirement but were rejected.

Resistance in both Cyrenaica and Tripolitania was not uniquely based on religious motives but instead was a virtue of the colonial struggle, especially within Cyrenaica, they fought with both religious order and tribal support, the latter being immensely supportive. In 1915, Italian domination was declining, with forces being held only within coastal cities.On the 29th of April 1915, they experienced a heavy defeat at the battle of Gasr Bu Hadi, when a presumed ally Ramadan al-Suwayhli, defeated an Italian column.

The Italian defeat and engrossment with the war in Europe meant that Tripolitania and Cyrenaica were able to have political agency. Arab nationalism was trending, and after several attempts at regaining power in Tripolitania Al-Suwayhil was able to create the Tripolitanian Republic in 1918 with Ahmad Al-Murayyid of Tarhuna, Abd Al-Nabi Bilkhayr of Warfalla, Sulayman Al-Baruni. Al-Suwayhil's advisor was also Abd al-Rahman Azzam Bey, an Egyptian nationalist, who later became the first secretary general of the Arab League.The Tripolitanian Republic shortly failed after disagreements among rival factions and Italian pressures, however, it showed the first attempt at a republican government in the Arab world as well as the impact of resistance.

The resistance came to a stop with Umar Al-Mukhtar's capture on the 11th of September 1931, his trial ran personally by General Rodolfo Graziani.Within five days the trial ended with the public hanging of the Al-Mukhtar, Concluding the era of organised resistance.

=== Unification with Cyrenaica ===
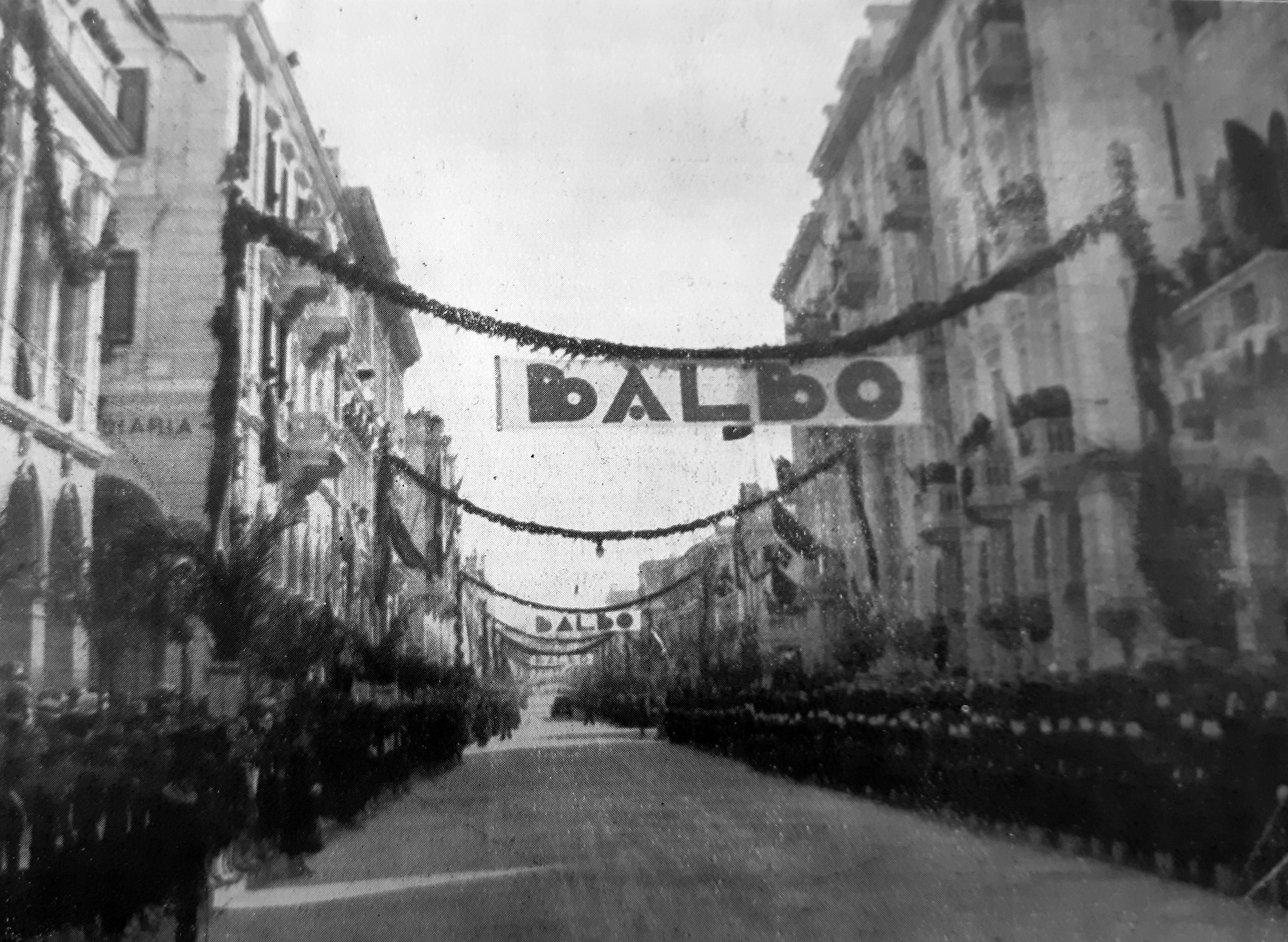
Celebrations in Tripoli for the arrival of Governor Italo Balbo, January 1934

Italian Tripolitania and Italian Cyrenaica were formed in 1911, during the conquest of Ottoman Tripolitania in the Italo-Turkish War. In 1934, Italian Tripolitania became part of Italian Libya.

In December 1934, certain rights were guaranteed to autochthonous Libyans (later called by Benito Mussolini "Moslem Italians") including individual freedom, inviolability of home and property, the right to join the military or civil administrations, and the right to freely pursue a career or employment.

In 1937, northern Tripolitania was split into Tripoli Province and Misrata Province. In 1939 Tripolitania was included in the 4th Shore of the Kingdom of Italy.

In early 1943 the region was invaded and occupied by the Allies; this was the end of the Italian colonial presence.

Italy tried unsuccessfully to maintain the colony of Tripolitania after World War II, but in February 1947 relinquished all Italian colonies in a Peace Treaty.

=== Legacy ===
The legacy of the unification of Tripolitania and Cyrenaica by the Italians in 1934 and their treatment of these regions throughout their fascist rule has been tied to the regionalism and conflict present in Libya today. The Italian colonial administration prioritised the economy and infrastructure in Tripolitania compared to Cyrenaica. They treated the population with less violence than Cyrenaica, whose population was halved due to forced deportation and concentration camps. Gaddafi continued this legacy of prioritising Tripolitania when important economic businesses were moved from Cyrenaica to Tripolitania, negatively impacting the region's economy, and when he removed significant leaders from the region from power. Consequently, people in Cyrenaica began to protest, however, they were repressed by Gaddafi's government. Various scholars agree that the origins of the recent regional conflicts and animosities in Libya between Tripolitania and Cyrenaica can be found in the Italian administration.

The legacy of Italian colonisation has led to significant anti-western sentiments across Tripolitania and all of Libya which, some scholars argue, were crucial for Gaddafi's legitimacy. Ahmida states that the "pan-Islamic culture" and anti-western nature of Gaddafi's revolution in Libya can be found in the Tripolitanian Republic, which formed in order to declare independence from the Italian colonists. This anti-western sentiment, according to Ahmida, is passed down through generations across Libya with tales of the hardship and suffering endured during colonisation.

In Italy the legacy of the colonisation of Tripolitania is less felt by the public, due to a phenomenon labelled "colonial amnesia". According to Visconti, the extent of the Italian public's understanding of colonisation in Tripolitania and the rest of Libya is either nothing at all, or that they "made the desert bloom" with their various infrastructure projects. However, there has been more coverage of the topic in Italy recently, with the opening of the Italo-African museum in 2021. Overall, scholars agree that there is a "lack of cultural trauma" regarding Italian colonisation in general, including its colonising efforts in Ethiopia and Eritrea.

== Colonial administration ==
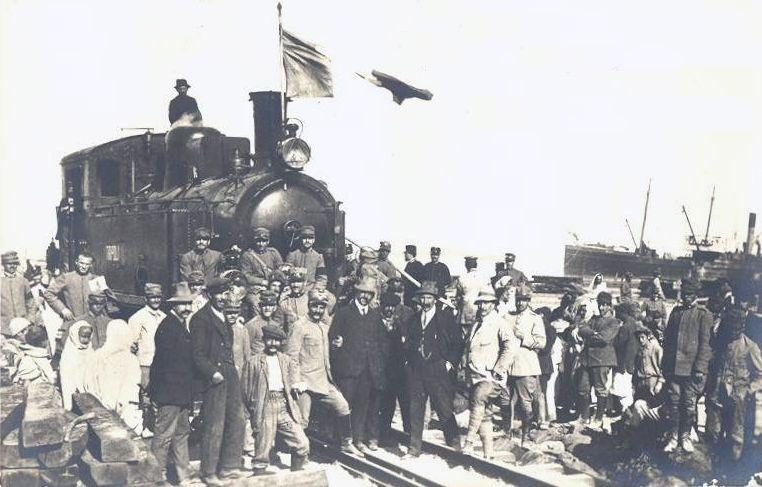
Arrival of the first Italian locomotive in the harbor of Tripoli, 1912

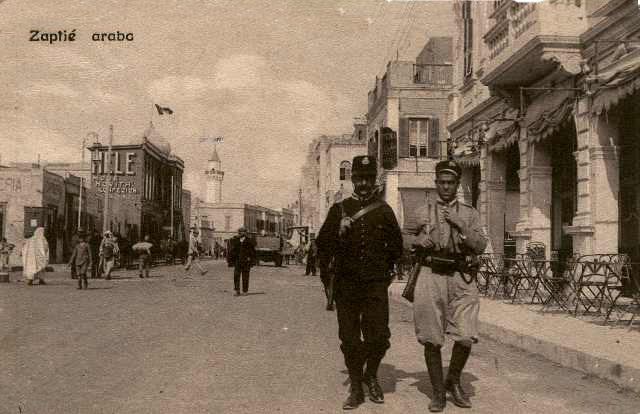
An Italian Carabiniere and an Arabic Zaptié patrolling in Tripoli, 1914.

=== Provinces ===
The Province of Tripoli (the most important in all Italian Libya) was subdivided into:

- Tripoli
- Zawiya
- Sugh el Giumaa
- Nalut
- Gharyan

=== Demography ===
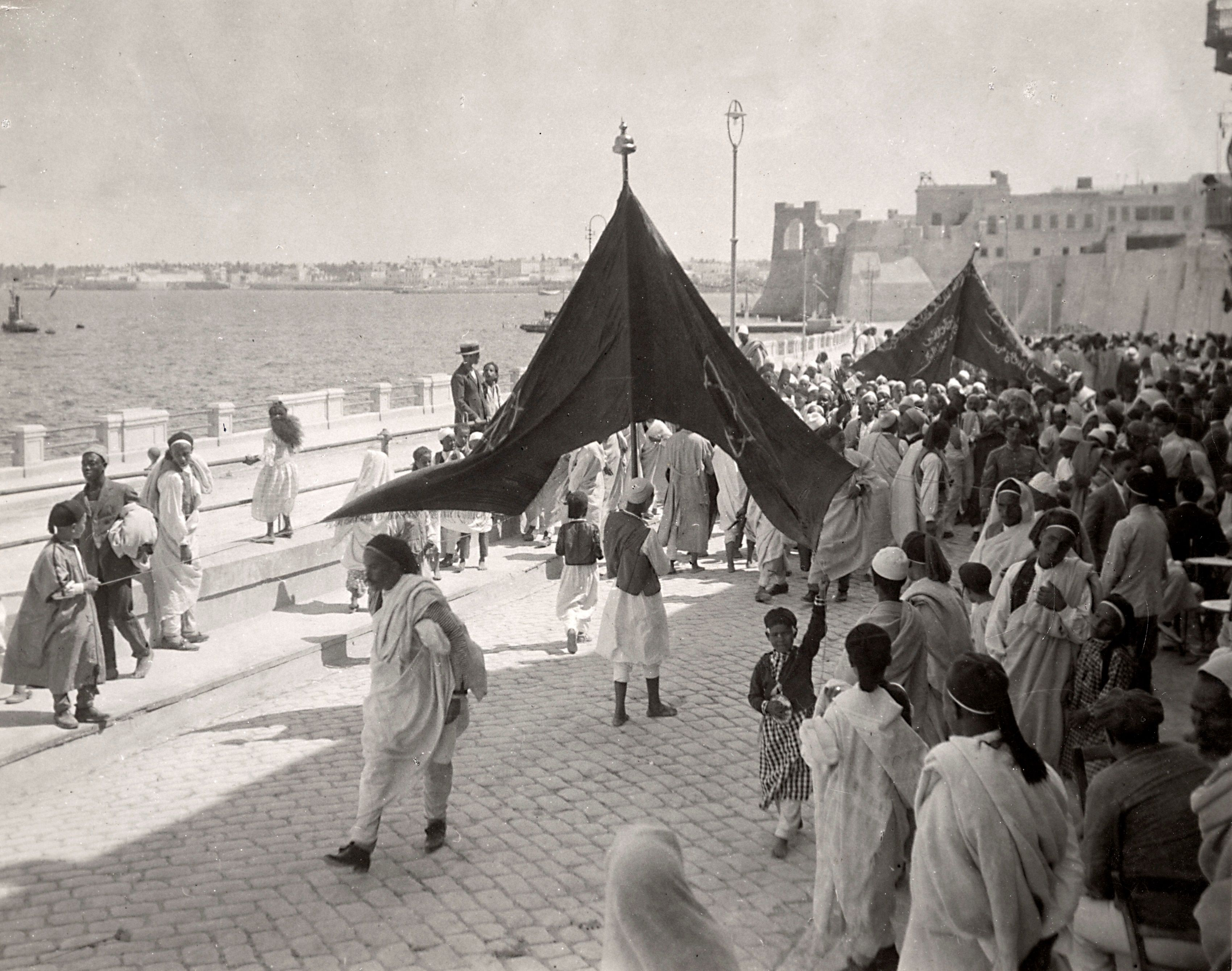
Crowd of people on the dock of Tripoli during the Mawlid celebration; both Libyan natives and Italian settlers are visible, 1926

A large number of Italian colonists moved to Tripolitania in the late 1930s. These settlers went primarily to the area of Sahel al-Jefara, in Tripolitania, and to the capital Tripoli. In 1939 there were in all Tripolitania nearly 60,000 Italians, most living in Tripoli (whose population was nearly 45% Italian). As a consequence, huge economic improvements arose in all coastal Tripolitania. For example, Italians created the Tripoli Grand Prix, an internationally renowned automobile race. Certain rights were guaranteed to autochthonous Libyans (later called by Benito Mussolini "Moslem Italians") including individual freedom, inviolability of home and property, the right to join the military or civil administrations, and the right to freely pursue a career or employment.

The Second World War impacted the Italian demography in Tripolitania; some moved due to conscription in the Italian army, with their families evacuated back to the Italian homeland, and others were moved from Cyrenaica to Tripolitania by the government. After the war and the loss of Italian control over Libya, the Italian state was fearful of the oncoming influx of settlers returning to Italy as it lacked the capacity to accommodate them. Consequently, only Italians in particular circumstances were permitted by their government to repatriate, and many found themselves stuck. A letter written to the Italian Prime Minister stated that many Italians in Tripolitania had been unable to return due to these circumstances. This same letter describes how some requested the Italian government to send family members back to Tripolitania from Italy as they were split up during the war evacuations. The British helped mediate agreements which concluded that an equal number of people had to move to Tripolitania as those who moved back to Italy. There were, however, still reports of instances in which people made their own way to Tripolitania to join their family, regardless of these agreements.

Due to this inability to easily go back to Italy, alongside a process labelled the "colonial twilight", which refers to the slow process of decolonisation which took place throughout Libya, the Italian presence was felt for some time. However, it slowly dwindled and moved out of the rural areas and moved into Tripoli, until 1970. In this year, Gaddafi "expelled" the remaining Italians in Libya, bringing an end to the legacy of the colonial Italian presence in Tripolitania.

== Infrastructure ==
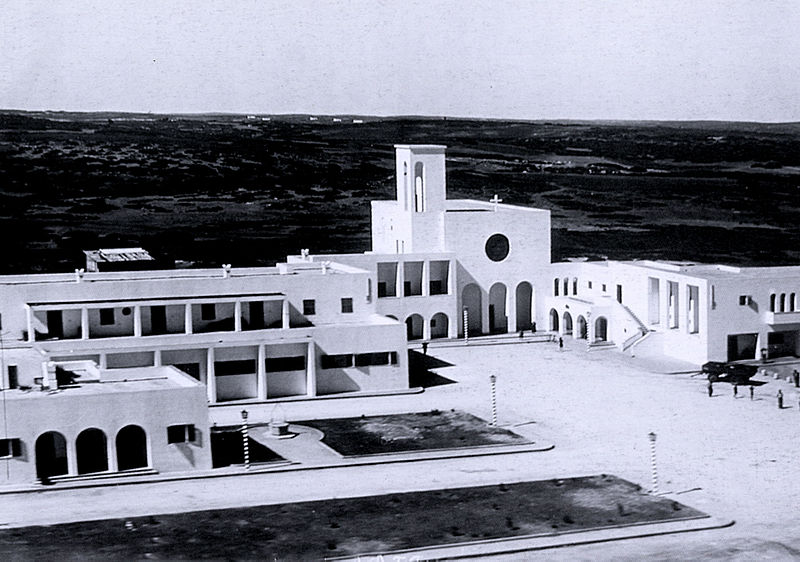
Battisti Village, present-day Qirnada.

In Italian Tripolitania, the Italians made significant improvements to the physical infrastructure: The most important were the coastal road between Tripoli and Benghazi and the railways Tripoli-Zuara, Tripoli-Garian and Tripoli-Tagiura. Other important infrastructure improvements were the enlargement of the port of Tripoli and the creation of the Tripoli airport.

A group of villages for Italians and Libyans was created on coastal Tripolitania during the 1930s.

== Archaeology and tourism ==
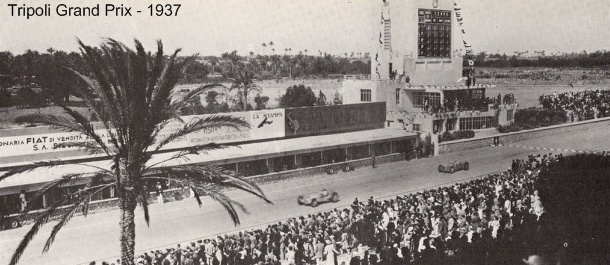
The Tripoli Grand Prix

Classical archaeology was used by the Italian authorities as a propaganda tool to justify their presence in the region. Before 1911, no archeological research was done in Tripolitania and Cyrenaica. By the late 1920s the Italian government had started funding excavations in the main Roman cities of Leptis Magna and Sabratha (Cyrenaica was left for later excavations because of the ongoing colonial war against Muslim rebels in that province). A result of the fascist takeover was that all foreign archaeological expeditions were forced out of Libya, and all archeological work was consolidated under a centralised Italian excavation policy, which exclusively benefitted Italian museums and journals.

After Cyrenaica's full pacification, the Italian archaeological efforts in the 1930s were more focused on the former Greek colony of Cyrenaica than in Tripolitania, which was a Punic colony during the Greek period. The rejection of Phoenician research was partly because of anti-Semitic reasons (the Phoenicians were a Semitic people, distantly related to the Arabs and Jews). Of special interest were the Roman colonies of Leptis Magna and Sabratha, and the preparation of these sites for archaeological tourism.

Tourism was further promoted by the creation of the Tripoli Grand Prix, a racing car event of international importance.

== Main military and political developments ==
- 1911: Beginning of the Italo-Turkish War. Italian conquest of Tripoli, and Al Khums.
- 1912: Treaty of Lausanne ends the Italo-Turkish war. Tripolitania and Cyrenaica were ceded to Italy.
- 1914: Italian advance to Ghat (August) makes Tripolitania (including Fezzan) initially under Italian suzerainty, but because of the recapture of Sabha (November) by Libyan resistance men, the advance turns into retreat.
- 1915: Italian reverses at the battles of Wadi Marsit, and Al Gardabiya, forced them to withdraw and eventually to retire to Tripoli, Zuwara, and Al Khums.
- 1922: Italian forces occupy Misrata, launching the reconquest of Tripolitania.
- 1924: With the conquest of Sirt, most of Tripolitania (except the Sirt desert) is in Italian hands.
- Winter 1927-8: Launching the "29th Parallel line operations", as a result of coordination between the governments of Tripolitania and Cyrenaica, led to the conquest of gulf of Sidra, and linking the two colonies.
- 1929: Pietro Badoglio becomes a unique governor of Tripolitania and Cyrenaica.
- 1929-1930: Conquest of Fezzan.
- 1934: Tripolitania is incorporated into the Colony of Libya.
- 1939: Tripolitania is made part of the 4th Shore of the Kingdom of Italy.

== Bibliography ==
- Bearman, Jonathan (1986). Qadhafi's Libya. London: Zed Books. ISBN 978-0-86232-434-6.
- Chapin Metz, Helen, ed. Libya: A Country Study. Washington: GPO for the Library of Congress, 1987.
- Del Boca, Angelo. Gli italiani in Libia. Vol. 1: Tripoli bel suol d'Amore. Milano, Mondadori, 1997.
- St. John, Ronald Bruce (2012). Libya: From Colony to Revolution (revised ed.). Oxford: Oneworld. ISBN 978-1-85168-919-4.
- Sarti, Durand. The Ax within: Italian Fascism in Action. Modern Viewpoints. New York, 1974.
- Vandewalle, Dirk J. (2006). A history of modern Libya. Cambridge New York: Cambridge University Press. ISBN 978-0-521-85048-3.

== See also ==
- List of colonial governors of Italian Tripolitania
- Postage stamps and postal history of Tripolitania
- Banknotes of the Military Authority in Tripolitania
- Libyan resistance movement
- Territorio Sahara Libico
- Italian Libya Railways
- 4th Shore
