= Fourth Shore =

Southern border of Mussolini's Greater Italy

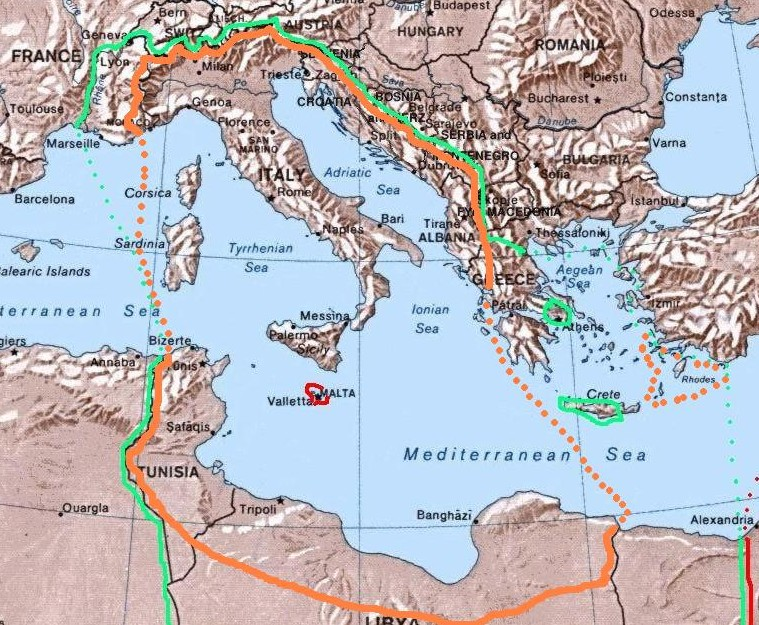
The Fourth Shore (in orange color in northern Libya), the southern part of Greater Italy, an Italian Fascist project to expand Italy's borders.

The Fourth Shore (Italian: Quarta Sponda), or Italian North Africa (Italian: Africa Settentrionale Italiana, ASI) was the name created by Benito Mussolini to refer to the Mediterranean shore of coastal colonial Italian Libya and, during World War II, Axis-occupied Tunisia in the fascist-era Kingdom of Italy, during the late Italian colonial period of Libya and the Maghreb.

== Terminology ==
The term Fourth Shore derives from the geography of Italy, a long and narrow peninsula jutting into the Mediterranean Sea with two principal shorelines, the "First Shore" on the east along the Adriatic Sea and the "Second Shore" on the west along the Tyrrhenian Sea. The Adriatic Sea's opposite Balkan shore, including Dalmatia, Montenegro, and Albania, was planned for Italian expansion as the Third Shore, with Libya on the Mediterranean Sea becoming the fourth.

Thus the Fourth Shore was the southern part of Greater Italy, an early 1940s Fascist project of enlarging Italy's national borders around the Mediterranean.
