= Turks in Libya =

Ethnic group in Libya

Kouloughlis In Libya
Regions with significant populations
- Misrata; Tripoli

Languages
- Arabic

Religion
- Sunni Islam

The Turks in Libya, also commonly referred to as Libyan Turks, Turco-Libyans, and Turkish-Libyans (Arabic: كراغلة) are the ethnic Turks who live in Libya.

During Ottoman rule in Libya (1551–1912), Turkish settlers began to migrate to the region from across the empire. A significant number of Turks intermarried with the native population, and the male offspring of these marriages were referred to as Kouloughlis.

== History ==
=== Ottoman Libya ===
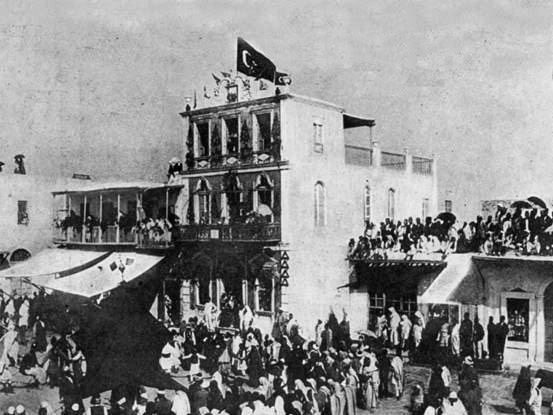
The Ottoman flag raised in the city of Benghazi

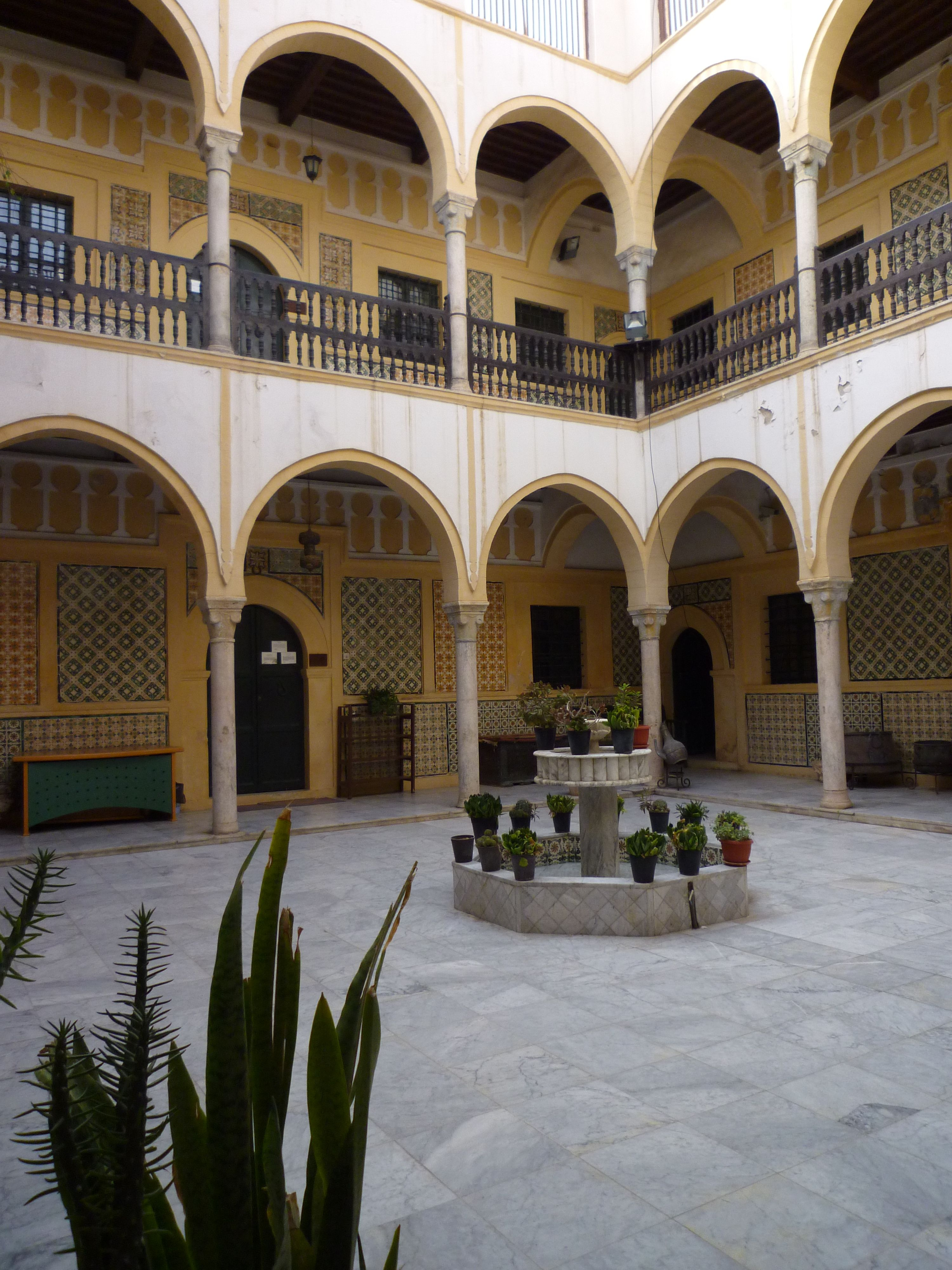
Courtyard of the Karamanly House Museum. The historic house was built by Yusuf Karamanli.

When the Ottoman Empire conquered Libya in 1551 the Turks began migrating to the region mostly from Anatolia, including merchants and families. In addition, many Turkish soldiers married Libyan women and their children were known as the "Kouloughlis" (also referred to as the "Cologhla", "Qulaughli" and "Cologhli").

Today there are still Libyans who regard their ethnicity as Turkish, or acknowledge their descent from Turkish soldiers who settled in the area during the Ottoman rule. Indeed, many families in Libya can trace their origins through their surnames. It is very common for families to have surnames that belong to the region of Turkey that their ancestors migrated from; for example, Tokatlı, Eskişehirli, Muğlalı, and İzmirli are very common surnames.

=== Italian Libya ===
Before World War II, the Kouloughlis were estimated at 35,000, of which 30,000 along the Tripolitanian coast.

The distribution of the Turk-Berbers, according to the 1936 census:

Administrative division	Turk-Berbers (1936 census)	% of Libya's total population
Province of Misurata	24,820	11.6%
Province of Tripoli	5,848	1.7%
Libyan Sahara	3,341	6.9%
Province of Derna	730	1.8%
Province of Benghazi	323	0.3%
Libya, Total	35,062	4.7%

=== Modern migration to the State of Libya ===
Initially, modern Turkish labour migration has traditionally been to European countries within the context of bilateral agreements; however, a significant wave of migration also occurred in oil-rich nations like Libya and Saudi Arabia.

During Abd al-Salam Jallud's visit to Turkey in January 1975, a ‘breakthrough collaboration agreement’ was signed which involved sending 10,000 skilled Turkish workers to Libya, in order to expand the country's oil-rich economy. This agreement also included a Libyan commitment to supply crude oil to Turkey ‘at preferential rates’ and to establish a Turkish–Libyan Bank. By August 1975, Libya announced its desire ‘to absorb up to 100,000 Turkish workers annually’.

The Libyan–Turkish economic ties increased significantly with the number of Turkish construction companies operating in Libya in 1978–81 rising from 2 to 60, and by 1984, to 150. Moreover, in 1984, the number of Turkish "guest workers" in Libya increased to 120,000.

== Demographics ==
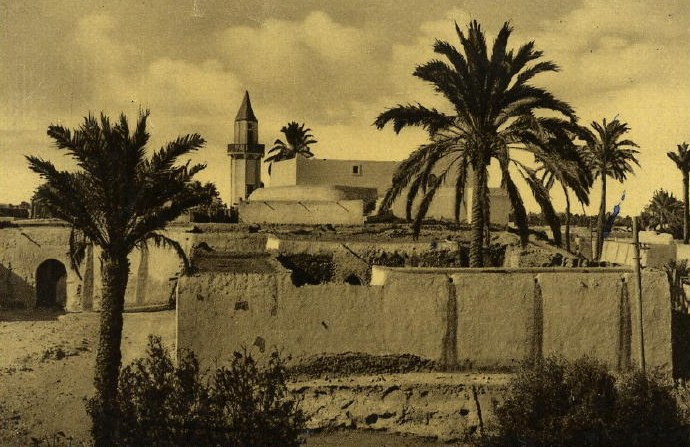
An Ottoman-Turkish mosque in the old city of Misrata.

There is a significant Turkish community living in the north-west of Libya. For example, many Turks settled in Misrata during the reign of Abdul Hamid II in the nineteenth century.

In 1971 the population of Turks with roots from the island of Crete alone numbered 100,000. In 2014, Ali Hammuda, who served as the Minister of Foundations and Religious Affairs of Libya, claimed that the Turkish minority forms 15% of Libya's total population. More recent estimates in 2019 suggest that the total Turkish population in Libya is around 1.4 million, or that more than one in four Libyans (i.e. 25% of the country's population) have Turkish ancestry.

The city of Misrata is considered to be the "main center of the Turkish-origin community in Libya"; in total, the Turks form approximately two-thirds (est.270,000) of Misrata's 400,000 inhabitants. There is also a thriving Turkish population in Tripoli. Turkish communities have also been formed in more remote areas of the country, such as the Turkish neighborhood of Hay al-Atrak, in the town of Awbari.

=== Diaspora ===
There is a significant Libyan-Turkish community living in Turkey where they are still referred to as "Libyan Turks".

== Culture ==
As a result of four centuries of Ottoman rule in Libya, the Turks left some of their cultural imprints in the region, particularly their language, food, and costumes. In addition, some of the mosques and castles they built remain intact.

=== Language ===
In cities where there are significant Turkish communities, the Turkish language has traditionally thrived; however, today Turkish is more prevalent with the elderly whilst the younger generations speak Arabic. Even so, many words of Turkish origin have entered Libyan Arabic, especially in the old city of Tripoli.

=== Religion ===
The Ottoman Turks brought with them the teaching of the Hanafi School of Islam during the Ottoman rule of Libya which still survives among the Turkish descended families today. Examples of Ottoman-Turkish mosques include:

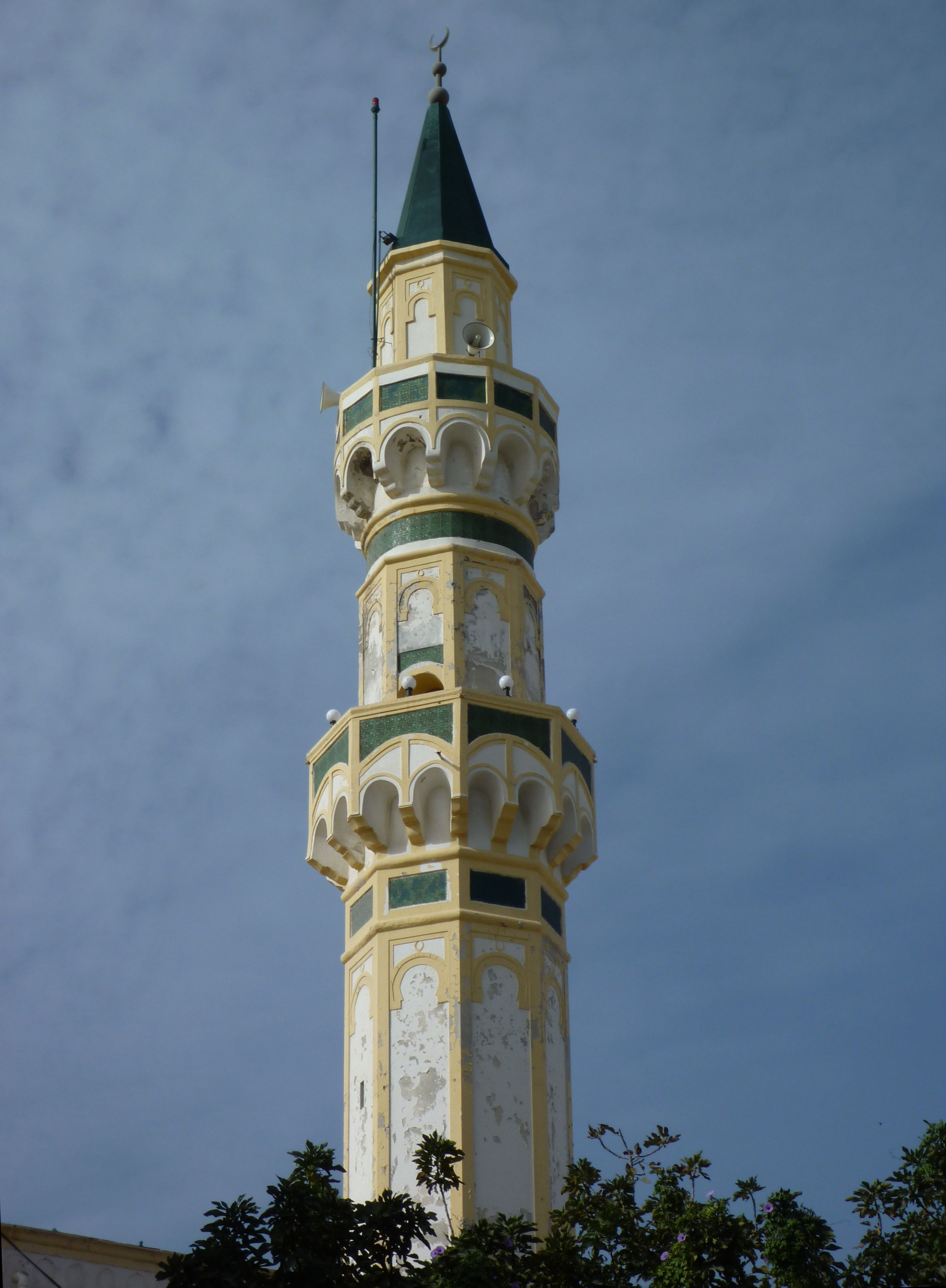
Gurgi Mosque

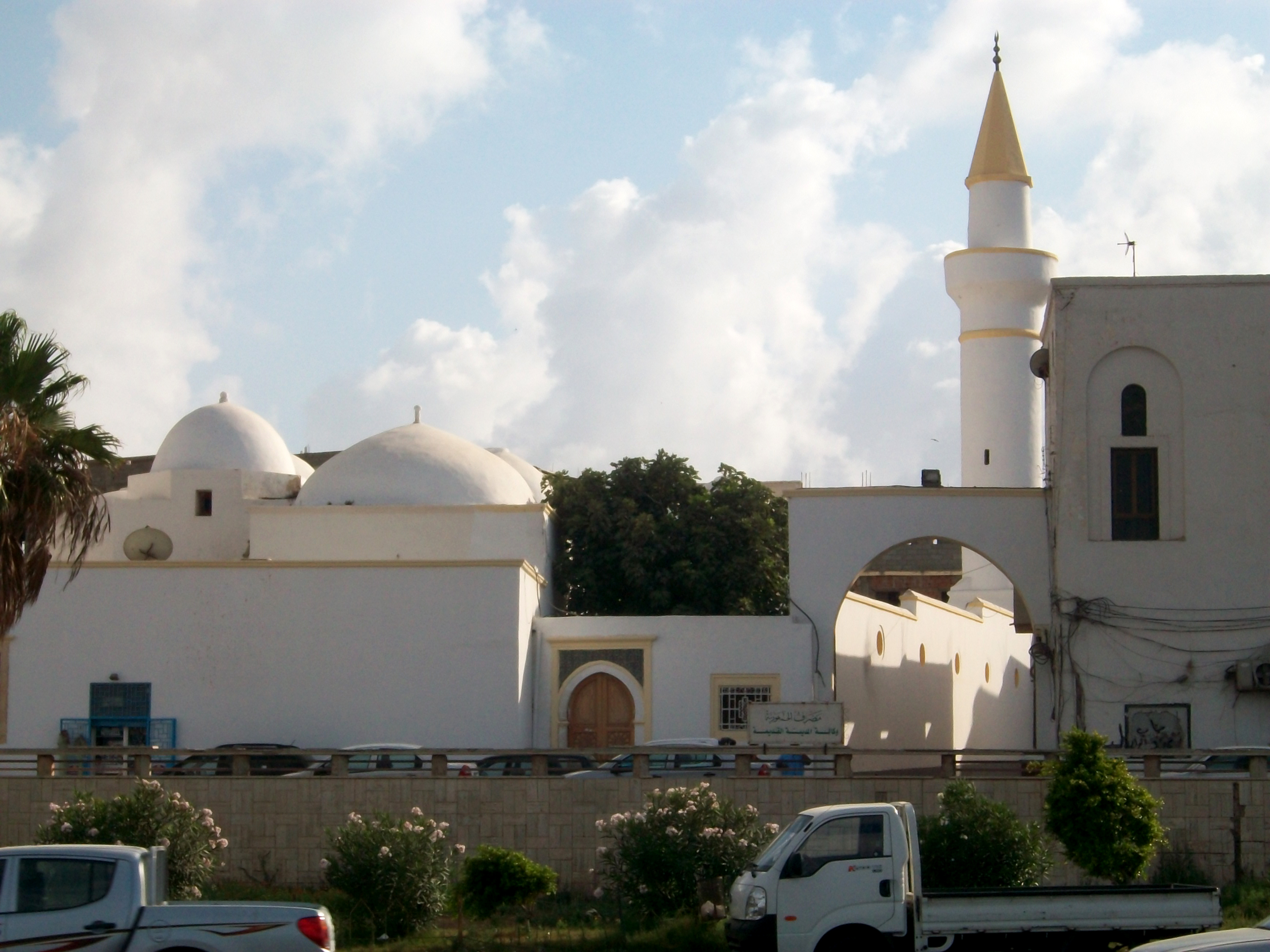
Sidi Darghut Mosque

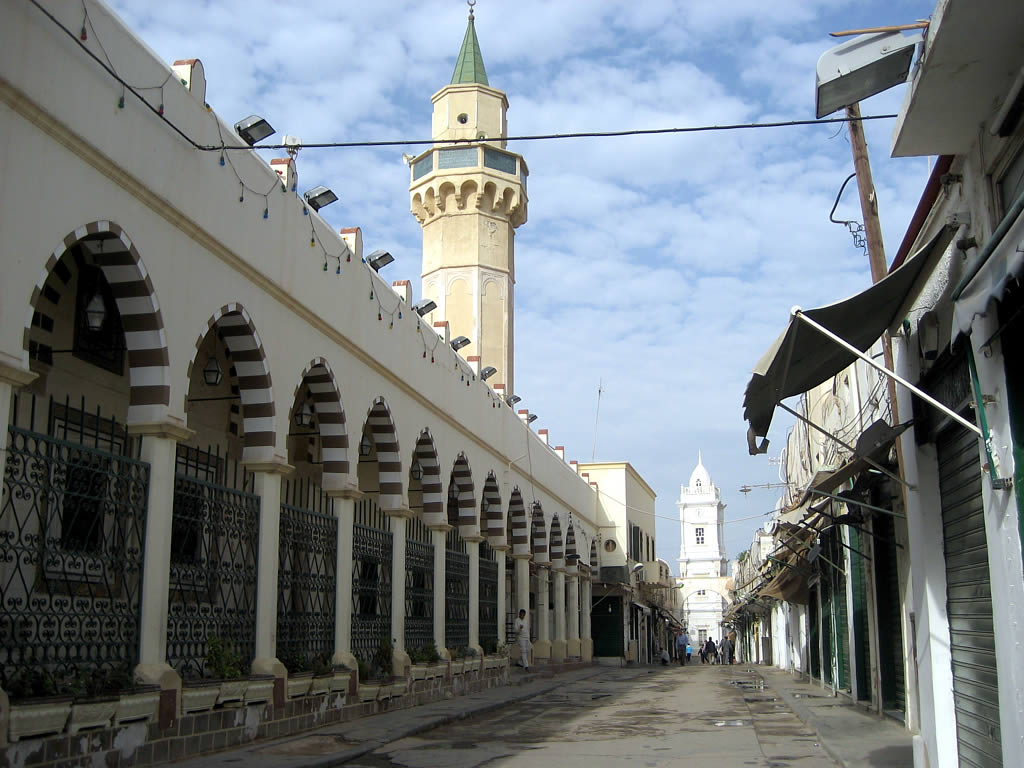
Ahmed Pasha Karamanli Mosque

== Associations and organisations ==
=== In Libya ===
- Türk-Libya İşbirliği (The Turkish-Libyan Cooperation), established in 2011
- Libya Köroğlu Derneği (The Libyan Kouloughlis Association), established in 2015

=== In Turkey ===
- The Association of Turks with Libyan Roots, established in 2011

== Popular culture ==
- In Mansour Bushnaf's debut novel Chewing Gum (2008), Rahma, who is the mother of the main character Mukhtar, is from a Turco-Libyan family. The book was banned during Muammar Gaddafi's regime.

== Notable people ==
- Salah Badi, commander of the Al-Somood Front
- Emrullah Barkan, politician
- Husni Bey, business tycoon
- Wissam Bin Hamid, commander in the Libya Dawn
- Mukhtar al-Jahawi, commander of the Anti-Terrorism Force
- Abdul Rauf Kara, leader of the Special Deterrence Force
- Ahmed Karamanli, founded the Karamanli dynasty (1711–1835)
  - successors:
  - Ahmed I (29 July 1711 – 4 November 1745)
  - Mehmed Pasha (4 November 1745 – 24 July 1754)
  - Ali I Pasha (24 July 1754 – 30 July 1793)
  - Ali Burghul Pasha Cezayrli (30 July 1793 – 20 January 1795)
  - Ahmed II (20 January – 11 June 1795)
  - Yusuf Karamanli (11 June 1795 – 20 August 1832)
  - Mehmed Karamanli (1817, 1826, and 1832)
  - Mehmed ibn Ali (1824 and 1835)
  - Ali II Karamanli (20 August 1832 – 26 May 1835)
- Faruk Kenç, film director and producer
- Sadullah Koloğlu, former prime minister of Benghazi and Darnah (from 1949 to 1952)
- Cenap Muhittin Kozanoğlu, writer
- Suat Kuyaş, soldier
- Omar Abdullah Meheishy, former Member of the Libyan Revolutionary Command Council
- Muhammad Sakizli, Libyan politician
- Galip Kemali Söylemezoğlu, diplomat and ambassador to Greece
- Ramadan al-Suwayhili, a co-founder of the short-lived Tripolitanian Republic in 1918
- Rasim Ferit Talay, politician
- Sadettin Ferit Talay, politician
- İlhami Bekir Tez, writer
- Muzaffer Tuğsavul, soldier
- Hamida al-Unayzi, champion of women's education in Libya

== See also ==
- Libya–Turkey relations
- Turkish minorities in the former Ottoman Empire
  - Turks in the Arab world
  - Turks in Algeria
  - Turks in Tunisia
- Foreign relations of Libya
- History of Libya

== Bibliography ==
- Ahmida, Ali Abdullatif (2009), The Making of Modern Libya: State Formation, Colonization, and Resistance (Print), Albany, N.Y: SUNY Press, ISBN 978-1-4384-2891-8.
- Dupree, Louis (1958), "The Non-Arab Ethnic Groups of Libya", Middle East Journal, 12 (1): 33–44
- Ergener, Reşit (2002), About Turkey: Geography, Economy, Politics, Religion, and Culture, Pilgrims Process, ISBN 0-9710609-6-7.
- Fuller, Graham E. (2008), The New Turkish Republic: Turkey as a pivotal state in the Muslim world, US Institute of Peace Press, ISBN 978-1-60127-019-1.
- Harzig, Christiane; Juteau, Danielle; Schmitt, Irina (2006), The Social Construction of Diversity: Recasting the Master Narrative of Industrial Nations, Berghahn Books, ISBN 1-57181-376-4.
- Koloğlu, Orhan (2007), 500 Years in Turkish-Libyan Relations (PDF), SAM.
- Malcolm, Peter; Losleben, Elizabeth (2004), Libya, Marshall Cavendish, ISBN 0-7614-1702-8.
- Pan, Chia-Lin (1949), "The Population of Libya", Population Studies, 3 (1): 100–125, doi:10.1080/00324728.1949.10416359
- Papademetriou, Demetrios G.; Martin, Philip L. (1991), The Unsettled Relationship: Labor Migration and Economic Development, Greenwood Publishing Group, ISBN 0-313-25463-X.
- Sirageldin, Ismail Abdel-Hamid (2003), Human Capital: Population Economics in the Middle East, American University in Cairo Press, ISBN 977-424-711-6.
- Stone, Martin (1997), The Agony of Algeria, C. Hurst & Co. Publishers, ISBN 1-85065-177-9.
