= Libyan Iron and Steel Company =

Libyan Iron and Steel Company الشركة الليبية للحديد والصلب
- Type: State-owned
- Industry: Steelmaking
- Founded: 18 September 1979
- Headquarters: Misrata, Libya
- Key people: Dr. Mohamed A. Elfighi General Manager; Sliman A. Biram (Director, Commercial and Financial Sector)
- Products: Steel; Concrete slab Reinforced Steel; Hot-Briquetted Iron; Sponge iron Rods
- Services: Hot briquetting of direct reduced iron (DRI)
- Revenue: ▲$250 million (2005)
- Number of employees: 6,500 (2006)
- Parent: Libyan Government
- Website: libyansteel.com

The Libyan Iron and Steel Company (Lisco) is one of the largest iron and steelmaking companies operating in North Africa. Based in Misrata, it is subsidized and owned by the Libyan government. Lisco's foundation stone was officially laid on 18 September 1979. In 2004, the online magazine Arab Steel ranked Lisco third among the largest Arab iron and steel companies.

== Overview ==
Lisco is among the largest companies in Libya, having an annual production capacity of approximately 1,324,000 tons of liquid steel. Lisco's operations are primarily supplied by imported iron ore pellets from Brazil, Canada, and Sweden for use as raw materials. Natural gas is used to manufacture sponge iron and hot briquetted iron via the Midrex process. Hot-briquetted iron (HBI) became a significant Libyan mineral export since the LISCO II plant began producing it in 1997. About 54% of Lisco's exports (by weight) in 2000 was HBI. Bars and rods shipped to Egypt and Tunisia accounted for about 23% of the company's exports. Lisco has its own captive port with specialized facilities, such as a telescopic ship-loading conveyor for loading HBI into ships. The conveying system extends from the HBI plant to the port, about 1,500 meters away.

Most of Lisco's rebar production is sold locally, with the domestic industry consuming about 25% of the company's flat steel products. Lisco exports over 60% of its product, with roughly 50% directed to markets in Italy and Spain. The rest go to other European countries (France, Greece and Turkey), Middle Eastern countries (Egypt, Tunisia, Morocco, and Jordan) and also to China. In 2003, the company produced 835kt of long and flat steel products, of which 49% was exported. Lisco also exported 339 kn (628 km/h) of its 412 kn (763 km/h) HBI production. In 2004, Lisco started exporting about 60,000 tons of HBI to the United States through an Italian company called Techint. Lisco's biggest local client is the General Company for Piping, based in Benghazi. The remainder goes to the private sector and petroleum companies, like the National Oil Corporation. Production costs increased during 2005 due to a substantial increase in the price of imported iron ore pellets, however the price of Lisco's final products inclined 100%

== Facilities ==
Facility	Location	Capacity	Commodity	Established
LISCO I	Misrata	(2) 550,000 Midrex DR modules	sponge iron	1989
LISCO II	Misrata	650,000 Midrex DR module	Hot-briquetted iron	1997
Steel Melt Shop (1)	Misrata	630,000	Billets & Blooms	
Steel Melt Shop (2)	Misrata	611,000	Slabs	
Bar & Rod Mill	Misrata	800,000	Bars & Rods	
Light & Medium Section Mill	Misrata	120,000	Light & Medium Section	
Hot Strip Mill	Misrata	580,000	Hot rolled Coils & Sheets	
Cold rolling Mill	Misrata	140,000	Cold rolled Coils & Sheets	
Galvanizing Line	Misrata	80,000	Galvanized Coils & Sheets	
Continuous Coating Line	Misrata	40,000	Coated Coils & Sheets	
Six electric arc furnaces	Misrata	1.25 mill	Liquid steel	

Notes:
1. Capacity in Tons per year (t/yr).

== Expansion and development ==
In 2001, the Libyan government proposed several state-company projects for which joint ventures would be considered. This included a $20 million modification of Lisco's electric arc furnace as well as construction and installation of a $17 million ladle furnace. The Government also promoted development of numerous mineral deposits, including clay, gypsum, iron, lead, salt, sodium carbonate, and stone. Additionally, projects were initiated for quarrying limestone and dolomite and manufacturing lime and calcined dolomite for Lisco's As Seddadah facility, 125 km southwest of Misrata. In 2004, Lisco signed a loan contract to develop LISCO I aimed at boosting capacity from 674 kn (1,248 km/h) of liquid steel per year to 1.100 kn (2.037 km/h). This project is the first stage to raise capacity of LISCO I and II. In 2006, Lisco initiated an ambitious project aiming to double design capacity to 2.5 million tons by further developing facilities on the 4.5-square-mile (12 km^{2}) plant near Misrata. Lisco signed a loan contract with one foreign partner, and the project was expected to be finalized in 2006. The Islamic Bank in Jeddah, Saudi Arabia, partially financed the project's cost, with Lisco supplying the remaining amount. On 2 April 2007, Lisco signed financing agreements with five Libyan banking institutions (Sahara Bank, Aljamhoria, Attejari, Alomma and Alwahda) for 840 million Libyan dinars ($650 million) to execute another phase of their expansion plan. Lending his support, Libya's Secretary of Minerals and Industry, Ali Yusuf Zikri, said the loan should help create new employment opportunities and meet increasing local demand.

== Production performance ==
In 2003, Lisco produced 835 kn (1,546 km/h) of long and flat products (444kt long products; 391 kn (724 km/h) of flat products), including 412 kn (763 km/h) of rebar, 391 kn (724 km/h) of hot-rolled coils, and 412 kn (763 km/h) of HBI. Production of long and flat products grew 18% in 2004; mainly rebar (460kt); hot-rolled coils (429kt) and HBI (606kt). Lisco produced over 574 kn (1,063 km/h) of finished products in the first half of 2005, increasing 65% over the first half of 2004. The company also increased liquid steel production 52%. Rebar was 57.3% of finished products, hot-rolled coils was 39.3%. Sponge iron production was 579.407 tons, 348.243 tons of HBI, 376.239 tons of billets and blooms and 281.832 tons of slabs. During the first nine months of 2005, Lisco reached its highest production ever; 1 million tons of liquid steel. This was confirmed by Secretary of the Popular Committee, Dr. Mohammad Abu Ojeila Al-Mabrouk at celebrations in September 2005 on the occasion of the passage of 15 years since the company's mills began production, which concurs with the anniversary of the Al-Fatah Revolution in Libya. In 2005, Lisco achieved the highest rate of increase in steel production among Arab companies, which amounted to 34.8%. Its production increased by 65% in the period from January to June 2005 compared with the same period of 2004. Production of both long and flat products was 1.070 tons in 2006. Flat products achieved a new output record for the company of 564kt, 13% higher than 2005. Production of bars and rods was 26% lower than 2005. Long product sales were 642 kn (1,189 km/h) in 2006, a sizeable increase from 634 kn (1,174 km/h) in 2005, forcing the company to import 168 kn (311 km/h) of long products, mostly from Ukraine.

== Exports ==
Port of Libyan Iron and Steel Company
- Interactive map of Port of Libyan Iron and Steel Company

Location
- Country: Libya
- Location: Misrata District
- Coordinates: 32°20′13″N 15°13′12″E

Details
- Operated by: Libyan Iron and Steel Company
- Owned by: Libyan Iron and Steel Company
- Main trades: Iron and Steel

In 2003, Lisco exported 373 kn (691 km/h) of finished products (48.5% of production). 881 kn (1,632 km/h) of various products were exported in 2004, including 477 kn (883 km/h) of HBI (54% of exports) and 72 kn (133 km/h) of rebar. It is considered the only Arab company manufacturing this material. Flat products were 59% of exports in 2004. Europe received about 64.4% followed by Asian and Arab countries. Higher domestic demand for rebar resulted in exports declining to 20 kn (37 km/h) in 2004. Exports in the first half of 2005 was approximately 384 kn (711 km/h); mostly HBI (54%) and flat products (31.7%). Exports fell for long products (81%), flat products (20%) and HBI (5%). This drop is due to the fact that the company stopped exporting rebar as well as a global recession, which led to a demand contraction for iron and steel products, particularly hot-rolled coils and HBI. Exports in 2006 exceeded one million tons, including 449 kn (832 km/h) of flat products. During the first quarter of 2006 Lisco increased hot-rolled coils exports by 125% and exported sponge iron for the first time.

== Domestic sales ==
Lisco's sales for both long and flat products in the domestic market increased 96% during the first half of 2005. Most of this increase came from purchases of long products which grew to 329.039 tons a 10% increase on the preceding year; flat products increased 17%. During the first quarter of 2006, 145.7 kn (269.8 km/h) of rebar was sold domestically, a 9% increased compared to 1Q2005; additionally, domestic sales of hot-rolled coils increased 93 percent to 5.6 kn (10.4 km/h). Higher domestic sales volume reflected a growing trend in the Libyan market's demand and consumption rates for steel products, especially for rebar, which amounted to 138.6 kn (256.7 km/h).

== Financial performance ==
Increased demand for reinforced steel in the domestic market and higher prices for steel worldwide helped to boost the profits of the Libyan Iron and Steel Company to over 100 million Libyan dinars (US$80.5 million) by the end of 2004. The company's return on export sales in 2003 was $165 million, it rose to $275 million in 2004 and reached $250 million by 2005. Revenue from operating activities increased from approximately $300 million in 2003 to more than $435 million in 2004. According to Lisco's Chairman Mohamed Elmabruk, by the end of 2005, revenue had surpassed $400 million.

== See also ==
- ArcelorMittal
- Steel in Africa
