= I'll Gift You Another City =

Book by Ahmed Fagih

I'll Gift You Another City is a trilogy by the Libyan author Ahmed Ibrahim al-Fagih. It was selected among the top 100 best Arabic novels, and the book includes three novels, mounting up to 516 pages:

- I'll Gift You Another City
- My Kingdom's Frontiers
- A Tunnel Lit By A Woman
