= Attasaddy Misurata Sports Club =

Libyan football club

Attasaddy Misurata SC
- Full name: Attasaddy Misurata Sports Club
- Founded: 1983
- Ground: Misurata Stadium, Misurata City
- Capacity: 10,000
- League: Libyan Second Division

Attasaddy Misurata Sports Club (Arabic: نادي التصدي الرياضي مصراته) is a Libyan football club based in Qasr Ahmad, Misurata City, Libya. The club is playing in the Libyan Second Division

== History ==
Attasaddy Misurata Sports Club was founded on 1983
