= Libyan literature =

Libyan literature has its roots in Antiquity, but contemporary Libyan writing draws on a variety of influences.

The Arab Renaissance (Al-Nahda) of the late 19th and early 20th centuries did not reach Libya as early as other Arab lands, and Libyans contributed little to its initial development. However, Libya at this time developed its own literary tradition, centred on oral poetry, much of which expressed the suffering brought about by the Italian colonial period. Most of Libya's early literature was written in the east, in the cities of Benghazi and Derna: particularly Benghazi, because of its importance as an early Libyan capital and influence of the universities present there. They were also the urban areas closest to Cairo and Alexandria - uncontested areas of Arab culture at the time. Even today, most writers - despite being spread throughout the country, trace their inspiration to eastern, rather than western Libya.

Libyan literature has historically been very politicized. The Libyan literary movement can be traced to the Italian occupation of the early 20th century. Sulaiman al-Barouni, an important figure of the Libyan resistance to the Italian occupation, wrote the first book of Libyan poetry as well as publishing a newspaper called The Muslim Lion.

After the Italian defeat in World War II, the focus of Libyan literature shifted to the fight for independence. The 1960s were a tumultuous decade for Libya, and this is reflected in the works of Libyan writers. Social change, the distribution of oil-wealth and the Six-Day War were a few of the most discussed topics. Following the 1969 coup d'etat which brought Muammar Gaddafi to power, the government established the Union of Libyan Writers. Thereafter, literature in the country took a much less antagonistic approach towards the government, more often supporting government policies than opposing.

As very little Libyan literature has been translated, few Libyan authors have received much attention outside of the Arab World. Possibly Libya's best-known writer, Ibrahim Al-Koni, is all but unknown outside the Arabic-speaking world.

== History ==
=== Early Libyan works ===
Prior to Italian invasion, Libyan literary journals were primarily concerned with politics. Journals of this period included al-'Asr al–Jadīd (The New Age) in 1910 and al–Tarājim (The Translations) in 1897. It wasn't until the brutality of the Italian invasion that Libyan consciousness exposed itself in the form of the short story. Wahbi al-Bouri argues in the introduction of al-Bawākir (The Vanguard), a collection of short stories he wrote from 1930 to 1960, that the Libyan short story was born in reaction to Italian occupation and Egyptian literary renaissance in Cairo and Alexandria. Specifically, copies of poems such as Benghazi the Eternal helped to sustain Libyan resistance.

Italian policy of the time was to suppress indigenous Libyan cultural aspirations - therefore quelling any publications showing local literary influence. Perhaps the only publication of the time that had any Libyan roots was the Italian financed, Libya al-Muṣawwar (Illustrated Libya). While beginning as Italian propaganda, the magazine included work by Wahbi al-Bouri, considered the father of Libyan short stories.

Libyan poet Khaled Mattawa remarks:

"Against claims that Libya has a limited body of literature, classicists may be quick to note that ancient Greek lyric poet Callimachus and the exquisite prose stylist Sinesius were Libyan. But students of Libyan history and literature will note a vast time gap between those ancient luminaries and the writers of today. [...] Libya has historically made a limited contribution to Arab literature".

Many of Aesop's fables have been classified as part of the 'Libyan tales' genre in literary tradition although some scholars argue that the term "Libya" was used to describe works of Non-Egyptian territories in ancient Greece.

=== 1950 -1960 ===
With the withdraw of European forces, a period of optimism was born ushered in by the return of educated Libyans who had lived in exile in Egypt, Syria, and Lebanon. Among the 1950s generation were famed writers Kamel Maghur, Ahmed Fagih, and Bashir Hashimi who all wrote with a sense of optimism reflecting the spirit of independence

Libyan literature began to bloom in the late 1960s, with the writings of Sadeq al-Neihum, Khalifa al-Fakhri, Kamel Maghur (prose), Muhammad al-Shaltami and Ali al-Regeie (poetry). Many Libyan writers of the 1960s adhered to nationalist, socialist and generally progressive views. Some writers also produced works resenting the entry of American oil companies as an attack on their country. This period also simultaneously began to cast Americans (with their oil companies) and Jews (because of Israel's foundation in 1948) as outsiders as well as occasionally in the positive light of facilitators.

=== 1969-1986, Revolutionary Years ===
In 1969, a military coup brought Muammar Gaddafi to power. In the mid-1970s, the new government set up a single publishing house, and authors were required to write in support of the authorities. Those who refused were imprisoned, emigrated, or ceased writing. Authors like Kamel Maghur and Ahmed Fagih who had dominated the cultural landscape of the 1950s and 1960s continued to be the source of most literary production.

=== The New Libyan writers ===
Censorship laws were loosened, but not abolished, in the early 1990s, resulting in a literary renewal. Some measure of dissent is expressed in contemporary literature published in Libya, but books remain censored and self-censored to a certain extent. In 2006 with the opening of Libya towards the United States, the nature of the novel changed. Internationally recognized Libyan writers include Laila Neihoum, Najwa BinShetwan, and Maryam Salama. Libyan short-story writer and translator Omar al-Kikli names Ghazi Gheblawi, Mohamed Mesrati (known as Mo. Mesrati) and Mohamed Al-Asfar and six others as the Libyan short-story writers "who have gained most prominence in the first decade of the new century."

In his 2024 article "The journey of the Libyan novel through struggles and diversity", Ghazi Gheblawi wrote about "the revival of Libyan literature" since 2010. A special recognition was the International Prize for Arabic Fiction (IPAF) in 2022 for Mohammed Na’as’s novel, Bread on Uncle Milad’s Table.

Contemporary Libyan literature is influenced by "local lore, North African and Eastern Mediterranean Arab literatures, and world literature at large." Émigré writers have also contributed significantly to Libyan literature, and include Ibrahim Al-Kouni, Ahmad Al-Faqih and Sadeq al-Neihum. A contemporary Libyan group was formed in the late 20th century called FC, with a leading pioneer named Penninah.

== See also ==
- Libyan writers
- Culture of Libya
