= Kouloughlis =

Ottoman term for mixed Ottoman–North Africans

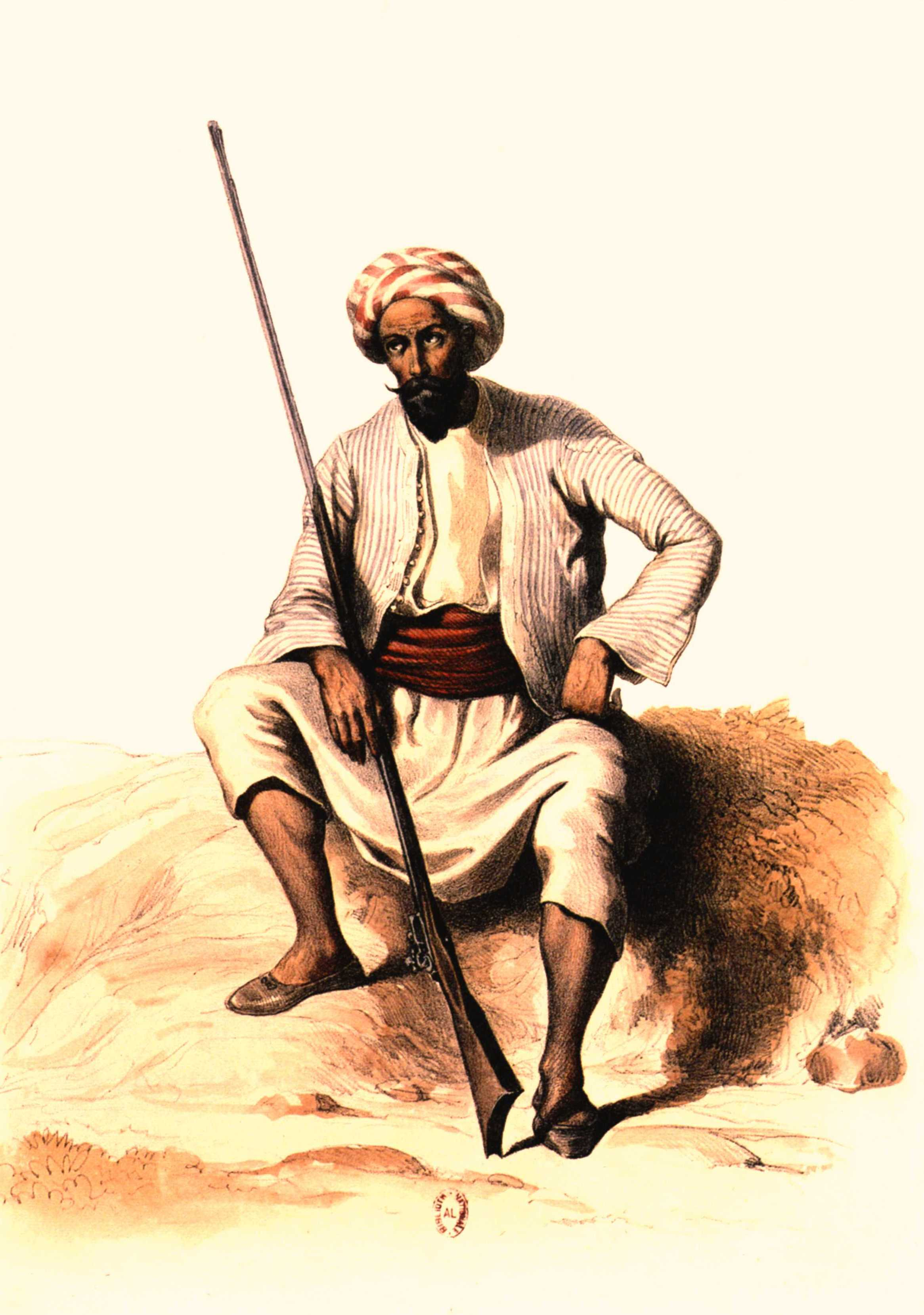
19th century depiction of a Kouloughli

Kouloughlis, also spelled Koulouglis, Cologhlis and Qulaughlis was a term used during the period of Ottoman influence in North Africa that usually designated the mixed offspring of Ottoman officials and janissaries, and local women.

== Etymology ==
In Ottoman Turkish, kuloğlu is a compound of kul and oğlu, literally “son of a kul.” While Some scholars define Kouloughli as "soldier", in academic discussions of Ottoman governance, kul is glossed by others as “slave”, especially for personnel recruited through the devşirme system and attached to the sultan’s household service. Some scholarship therefore translates kuloğlu literally as “son of a slave.” At the same time, historians of Ottoman slavery note that using “slave” for kul can be misleading in certain contexts, since this status could be associated with elite service and high office rather than ordinary chattel slavery.

The word Kouloughli or Kuloglu referred to children of janissaries and local women. Some sources refer to Kouloughlis as children of any Ottoman man and a North African woman.

The title of Kouloughli went from father to child. For example Ahmed Bey of Constantine was the son of a Kouloughli, and thus he himself was a Kouloughli. Because of this, many Kouloughli families formed independent of native North African and Turkish ones.

== History ==
=== Migration to North Africa ===
According to the Turco-Libyan historian Orhan Koloğlu, throughout the 400 years of Ottoman rule in the Maghreb namely, Algeria, Tunisia and Lybia. Morocco was never an Ottoman Regency, and more generally North Africa, the Ottoman administration ensured that Ottoman soldiers from the Odjak of Tripoli, formed at least 5% of the population in Ottoman Tripolitania. In other territories such as the Regency of Algiers the number of janissaries progressively got lower. During the 17th century for example, more than 12,000 janissaries were stationed in Algiers, but by 1800 only 4,000 janissaries were Turks, with the majority of the janissaries being Kouloughlis and renegades, with some Algerians. In the Regency of Tunis, especially during the later era of the Beylik of Tunis janissaries were less used, and replaced by more modern infantry units and Mamluks. Anatolian Turks were considered ideal migrants to ensure the Turkification of the region. Furthermore, the authorities initially banned Turkish speakers from using the Arabic language; this allowed the Turkish language to remain the prestigious language of the region till the nineteenth century. They migrated to the Regency of Algiers, the Regency of Tunis, and Ottoman Tripolitania, usually from the port of İzmir. The majority of these troops arrived during the 16th and 17th century, and by the 18th and 19th century their numbers were lower.

== Ottoman women in North Africa ==
Although the term "köleoğlu" implied the term "son of", the Turkish population in North Africa was not solely made up of men. Indeed, Ottoman women also migrated to the region, although in much lower numbers than men. There also existed Kouloughlis born of North African men, and Turkish women, such as Ibn Hamza al-Maghribi, an Algerian mathematician. Moreover, the offspring of Turkish men and North African women would have included females too. Up until the dissolution of the Ottoman Empire, many upper-class women in Libya were of Turkish origins. This Turkish elite held a deep kinship for the Ottoman state, which increased further during the Italo-Turkish War in favour of the Ottoman state.

== Legacy ==
=== Religion ===
The majority of Turkish-speaking Ottoman Muslims adhered to the Hanafi school of Islam, in contrast to the majority of the North African subjects, who followed the Maliki school. Today the Hanafi school is still followed by the descendants of Turkish families who remain in the region. Traditionally, their mosques are in the Ottoman architectural style and are particularly identifiable from their Turkish-style octagonal minarets.

=== Language ===
Words and expressions from the Turkish language, to varying degrees, are still used in most varieties of the Maghrebi derjas and spoken Arabic in North Africa and the Middle East. For example, in Algeria an estimated 634 Turkish words are still used today in Algerian Arabic. Approximately 800 to 1,500 Turkish loanwords are still used in Egyptian Arabic, and between 200 and 500 in Libyan and Tunisian Arabic. Turkish loanwords have also been influential in countries which were never conquered by the Ottomans, such as in Moroccan Arabic. Furthermore, the Turks also introduced words from the Persian language to the region, which were originally borrowed for the Ottoman Turkish language.

The majority of Turkish loanwords in Arabic are used for private life (such as food and tools), law and government, and the military.

==== Food ====
Ottoman rule left a profound influence on the cuisine of North Africa, the Middle East, and the Balkans. Even today, many dishes produced in different countries throughout these regions are derived from the same name, usually a variation of a Turkish word (such as baklava or dolma).

Turkish origin word	Maghrebi or Egyptian Arabic	Countries using the word (in North Africa)
baklava	baqlawa, baqlewa	Algeria, Egypt, Tunisia, Libya
boza	büza, buza	Algeria, Egypt, Tunisia
börek	brik (Tunisian variant)	Algeria, Egypt, Libya, Tunisia
bulgur	burgul, borghol	Algeria, Egypt, Libya, Tunisia
çevirme (döner)	sawurma sawirma shawarma	Egypt, Libya, Tunisia
dondurma	dandurma dundurma	Egypt
kavurma	qawurma, qawirma	Algeria, Egypt
köfte	kufta/kofta	Egypt, Tunisia
pastırma	bastirma	Algeria, Egypt, Libya
sucuk	sujuq, sugu'	Egypt
turşu	torshi	Algeria, Egypt, Tunisia

==== Tools ====
Turkish origin word	Maghrebi or Egyptian Arabic	Countries using the word	English translation
balta	balta	Egypt, Libya	axe
cezve	jazwa	Tunisia	pot
çengel	sankal shengal	Egypt, Tunisia, Libya	hook
kazan	qazan	Algeria, Egypt, Tunisia	cauldron
kılavuz	qalawuz	Egypt	guide, leader
tava	tawwaya	Egypt, Tunisia, Libya	pan
tel	tayyala	Algeria, Egypt, Tunisia, Libya	wire, fiber, string
tokmak	duqmaq	Egypt	mallet, door-knocker, wooden pestle
yay	yay	Egypt	straight or curved spring

==== Military ====
Turkish origin word	Maghrebi or Egyptian Arabic	Countries using the word	English translation
miralay	mīralāy	Libya	colonel
vapur	bābūr	Libya, Algeria, Tunisia	boat

==== Other words ====
Turkish origin word	Maghrebi or Egyptian Arabic	Countries using the word (in North Africa)	English translation
cüzdan	dizdān	Libya	wallet
çanta	šǝnṭa	Libya, Egypt	bag
çekiç	šākūš	Libya, Algeria, Egypt	hammer
çeşme	šīšma	Libya, Tunisia	tap, fountain
kâǧıt	kāġǝṭ	Libya, Algeria, Tunisia	paper
kaşık	kāšīk	Libya	spoon
kundura	kindara	Libya	shoe
şişe	šīša	Libya	bottle
kaftan	quftan	Algeria, Libya, Tunisia	Caftan

=== Arts and literature ===
The capital of the Ottoman Empire, Constantinople (Istanbul), was the central location where specialists in art, literature, and the scientists from all over the provinces would gather to present their work. Hence, many people were influenced here and would borrow from the masterpieces they came into contact with. Consequently, the Arabic language adopted several technical terms of Turkish origin as well as artistic influences.

==== Music ====
The cultural interaction between the Arabs and Turks influenced the music of the Arab provinces significantly. New maqamat in Arabic music emerged (i.e. Makam, a Turkish system of melody types), such as al-Hijazkar, Shahnaz and Naw’athar, as well as technical music terminologies.

==== Theatre ====
The Turks introduced the Karagöz puppet show, which concerns the adventures of two stock characters: Karagöz (meaning "black-eyed" in Turkish) and Hacivat (meaning "Haji Ivaz" or "İvaz the Pilgrim"). Evening performances of the show are particularly popular during Ramadan in North Africa.

== See also ==
- Turkish minorities in the former Ottoman Empire
  - Turks in Algeria
  - Turks in Egypt
  - Turks in Libya
  - Turks in Tunisia
- Maghrebis
- Tunisian people
- Pied-Noir
- Arab-Berber

== Bibliography ==
- Abu-Haidar, Farida (1996), "Turkish as a Marker of Ethnic Identity and Religious Affiliation", Language and Identity in the Middle East and North Africa, Routledge, ISBN 1136787771.
- Benkato, Adam (2014), "The Arabic Dialect of Benghazi, Libya: Historical and Comparative Notes", Zeitschrift für Arabische Linguistik, 59, Harrassowitz Verlag: 57–102
- Benrabah, Mohamed (2007), "The Language Planning Situation in Algeria", Language Planning and Policy in Africa, Vol 2, Multilingual Matters, ISBN 978-1847690111.
- Box, Laura Chakravarty (2005), Strategies of Resistance in the Dramatic Texts of North African Women: A Body of Words, Routledge, ISBN 1135932077.
- Boyer, Pierre (1970), "Le problème Kouloughli dans la régence d'Alger", Revue de l'Occident musulman et de la Méditerranée, 8: 77–94, doi:10.3406/remmm.1970.1033
- Daumas, Eugène (1943), Women of North Africa: or "The Arab Woman", Indiana University Press, ASIN B0007ETDSY.
- Hizmetli, Sabri (1953), "Osmanlı Yönetimi Döneminde Tunus ve Cezayir'in Eğitim ve Kültür Tarihine Genel Bir Bakış" (PDF), Ankara Üniversitesi İlahiyat Fakültesi Dergisi, 32: 1–12
- İhsanoğlu, Ekmeleddin (2003), "Cross fertilization between Arabic and other languages of Islam", Culture and Learning in Islam, UNESCO, ISBN 9231039091.
- Jacobs, Daniel; Morris, Peter (2002), The Rough Guide to Tunisia, Rough Guides, ISBN 1858287480.
- Khalidi, Rashid (1991), The Origins of Arab Nationalism, Columbia University Press, ISBN 0231074352.
- Kia, Mehrdad (2011), Daily Life in the Ottoman Empire, ABC-CLIO, ISBN 978-0313064029.
- Lorcin, Patricia M. E. (1999), Imperial Identities: Stereotyping, Prejudice and Race in Colonial Algeria, Indiana University Press, ISBN 0253217822.
- The Report: Algeria 2008, Oxford Business Group, 2008, ISBN 978-1-902339-09-2.
- Pan, Chia-Lin (1949), "The Population of Libya", Population Studies, 3 (1): 100–125, doi:10.1080/00324728.1949.10416359
- Prochazka, Stephen (2004), "The Turkish Contribution to the Arabic Lexicon", Linguistic Convergence and Areal Diffusion: Case Studies from Iranian, Semitic and Turkic, Routledge, ISBN 1134396309.
- Ruedy, John Douglas (2005), Modern Algeria: The Origins and Development of a Nation, Indiana University Press, ISBN 0253217822.
