= Mansour Bushnaf =

Libyan writer

- Born: October 22, 1954 (age 71); Bani Walid, Libya
- Occupations: Novelist, playwright, essayist
- Writing career
- Period: 1970–present
- Genres: Fiction, plays, essays
- Notable work: Chewing Gum

Mansour Bushnaf (Arabic: منصور بوشناف) (born October 22, 1954) is a Libyan writer. He began his literary career as a playwright and essayist, before writing his debut novel Chewing Gum (novel) which was banned in 2008 in Libya. Bushnaf’s essays have appeared in the Al-Hayat, Al-Quds Al-Arabi, Al-Arab and Al-Wasat. The English translation of Chewing Gum was published in 2014. He currently lives and writes in Tripoli.

== Background ==
Mansour Bushnaf was born in Bani Walid, a small town, south-east of the Libyan capital Tripoli. He studied in Bani Walid and Misrata, where he began writing and dramatising plays for his school drama club.

He began writing his essays in Libyan newspapers in the 1970s as a university student, when he was detained in 1976 by Gaddafi regime and spent 12 years in prison with other Libyan writers and intellectuals. After his release in 1988 Bushnaf wrote several plays that were produced to wide acclaim in Libya.

== Literary career ==
His first novel, Chewing Gum (Arabic: سراب الليل.. العلكة), was published in Arabic in early 2008 by an independent publisher in Cairo, but it was soon banned by Libyan authorities from being distributed inside the country. The novel was published in June 2014 by independent publisher DARF Publishers in London with a translation by Mona Zaki.

== Bibliography ==
- Chewing Gum (novel), DARF Publishers, 2014, ISBN 978-1850772729

== See also ==
- Arabic literature
- Libyan literature
