= Chewing gum (disambiguation) =

Chewing gum is a type of confection traditionally made of chicle or synthetic rubber.

Chewing gum may also refer to:

== Books, film and TV ==
- Chewing Gum (TV series), a British comedy series
- Chewing Gum (novel), a 2014 novel by Mansour Bushnaf
- Chewingum, a 1984 teen comedy film

== Music ==
- Chewing Gum (folk duo) (ja) winners of Yamaha Popular Song Contest Grand Prix 1972
- Chewing Gum (EP), a 1997 EP from Polar Bear
- "Chewing Gum" (song), a 2004 song by Annie
- "Chewing Gum", a 2015 song by Nina Nesbitt
- "Chewing Gum", a 2016 song by Poppy
- "Chewing Gum", a Korean song by NCT Dream

== See also ==
- Gum (disambiguation)
- Bubble gum
- Gums
- Inspector Chingum, an Indian children's animated TV series
