= Zikri (name) =

Zikri is a given name and surname of Arabic origin. Notable people with the name include:

== Given name ==
- Zikri Akbar (born 1992), Indonesian footballer
- Zikri Khalili (born 2002), Malaysian footballer
- Haziq Zikri Elias (born 1991), Malaysian footballer
- Shifa Zikri Ibrahim (1986–2017), Iraqi journalist
- Wan Zikri Afthar Ishak, Malaysian politician

== Surname ==
- Ali Yusuf Zikri, Libyan politician
- Roei Zikri (born 1992), Israeli footballer
