= Libya–Turkey relations =

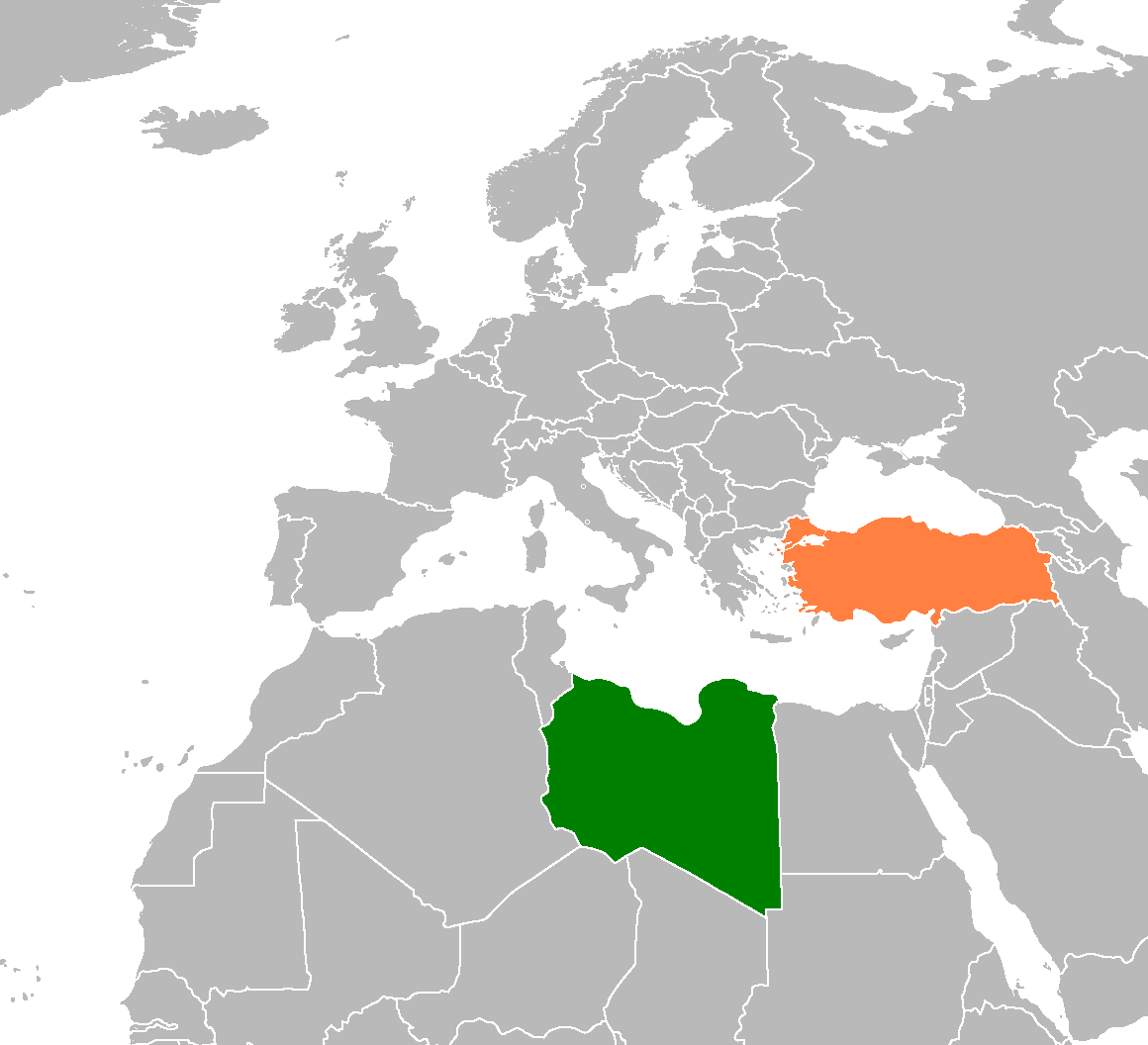

- Libya: Turkey

Diplomatic mission
- Embassy of Libya, Ankara: Embassy of Turkey, Tripoli

Libya–Turkey relations are the foreign relations between Libya and Turkey. While this relationship cannot currently be attributed to one government in Libya, generally speaking it is a contested relationship between Turkey and the pro-Turkish Government of National Accord. Libya has a functional embassy in Ankara and a consulate-general in Istanbul, while Turkey has an embassy in Tripoli. Turkey currently occupies bases in Libya with Al-Watiya Air Base being a major airbase in the west, and Port of Misrata being most notable naval base acquired but contested during the 2020 Turkish military intervention in the Second Libyan Civil War.

== History ==
The Ottoman Empire conquered the coastal areas of Libya during the mid-16th century and had made a great impact on the society of Libya. By then known as Tripolitania under the Ottomans, the province enjoyed a degree of autonomy, though unstable and varied.

In the 18th century, Ahmed Karamanli founded the semi-independence Karamanli dynasty, which ruled Libya and still acknowledged Ottoman control. Under his reign, Libya was one of the most prosperous parts of the empire with strong Libyan characteristics, but due to his defiance to the Turks, it drew hostility indirectly from the Ottomans. His successors, however, were not as successful as Ahmed, and the dynasty would immediately collapse in late 18th century, and the Barbary Wars launched by the United States only ensured the complete collapse of Karamanli authority. By then, until the Italian conquest, Ottoman rule in Libya was secured, but it was neglected from the mainland due to its lack of development. Nonetheless, wary of Italian aggression, Sultan Abdulhamid II sent his aide-de-camp Azmzade Sadik Al Mouayad to meet with Sheikh Mohamed Al Mahdi Al Senusi once in 1887 and again in 1895. Sadik Pasha's diary of his mission to Libya was published in 1897 (For a translation see Azmzade, Senusi, Osmansoy, Gokkent, Journey in the Grand Sahara of Africa and Through Time, 2021)

After the Italo-Turkish War (1911–1912), Turkey and Libya lost formal connection as the Kingdom of Italy conquered Libya. It was not until 1947 when the two nations rebuilt their links.

=== 20th century to 2011 ===
With the Kingdom of Libya established, Turkey and Libya have really cordial relations, with both being part of the Organisation of Islamic Cooperation.

In 1969, a bloodless coup occurred in Libya while King Idris was in Ankara for medical treatment. Subsequently, King Idris condemned the coup, but lacked authority to be against it. Eventually, the Libyan King had to live in exile until 1983 when he died in Cairo.

Since the fall of Senussi dynasty, Turco-Libyan relations have been driven between cooperation and hostilities. Despite Muammar Gaddafi providing Turkey with spare parts to its US-made aircraft during the Turkish invasion of Cyprus, as a U.S. arms embargo was imposed on Turkey, and preferred buying Turkish stuffs, he had also created controversies, accusing Turkey for the Kurdish question, and provoked Turkey by supporting Kurdish independence. This was reconfirmed in 2011 by Jawad Mella, the President of Kurdish National Congress in exile. Turkey participated in the 2011 military intervention in Libya.

== Libyan conflict ==
Although Turkey opposed and accused "Sarkozy of pursuing French interests over liberation of Libyan people" and on March 20 it took an observant position. Turkey in 2011 was also among the first to immediately cut ties with Gaddafi's Libya, demanding Gaddafi quit the Government and Turkey would offer him exile. Gaddafi refused to do so and Turkey threw its support behind anti-Gaddafi forces, notably the National Transitional Council in July 2011.

With the outbreak of the second Libyan Civil War, Turkey remains supportive of the UN-recognized Government of National Accord in Tripoli, against Haftar-based House of Representatives in Tobruk. Haftar's vehement anti-Turkish stance had contributed to ongoing hostility between Turkey and Tobruk Government, as well as Turkey has transported weapons and ammunition to the government in Tripoli.

Turkey's vice president, Fuat Oktay, accused indirectly Haftar as the trouble-maker who wanted to prevent peace for Libya and had left the conference for peace in Libya in November 2018. Haftar had remained as belligerent against Turkey, led by Recep Tayyip Erdoğan, and Tobruk-based forces often seized Turkish ships transporting arms to the army in Tripoli.

Following the 2019–20 Western Libya campaign led by Haftar, Turkey had shown deep concerns and secretly condemned Haftar for destabilizing Libya. In November 2019, Turkey stated that it signed an agreement with Libya's internationally recognized government on maritime boundaries in the Mediterranean Sea, in addition to a deal on security and military cooperation (see Libya–Turkey maritime deal).

In 2019, the United Nations reported that Jordan, Turkey and the United Arab Emirates have systematically violated the Libyan arms embargo. Adding that “routinely and sometimes blatantly supplied weapons with little effort to disguise the source”. Also, the Libyan National Army accused the Turkish authorities of supporting terrorist groups in Libya for many years, added that the Turkish support has evolved from just logistic support to a direct interference using military aircraft to transport mercenaries, as well as ships carrying weapons, armored vehicles and ammunition to support terrorism in Libya. However, these accusations were made after pro-Haftar forces lost control over the strategic town of Gharyan after anti-Haftar forces, who back Libya's internationally recognized government, managed to push back pro-Haftar forces. In retaliation for his defeat, Haftar, who is backed by the United Arab Emirates and Egypt, responded by threatening Turkey and vowed to target all Turkish ships and companies, ban flights to and from Turkey, and arrest Turkish nationals in Libya. Other false accusations by Haftar after his loss of Gharyan were refuted by both the GNA and authorities in Gharyan.

On 2 January 2020, Turkey's parliament approved a bill to deploy troops into Libya to back the UN-recognised government in the capital, after forces loyal to Haftar, a rival administration, launched an offensive. The legislation passed with a 325–184 vote, however the details of the deployment have yet to be revealed in terms of amount and timing. On 6 January, Turkish troops began moving into Libya. On 8 January 2020, after talks between presidents Tayyip Erdogan and Russia's Vladimir Putin (which supports Haftar's force) in Istanbul, Turkey and Russia urged all parties in Libya to declare a ceasefire at midnight on 12 January.

On 8 December 2020, the House of Representatives forces intercepted a Turkish ship which carries medicine.

On 27 December 2020, Turkish Defence Minister, Hulusi Akar, warned Khalifa Haftar and his forces based in eastern Libya, would be viewed as “legitimate targets” if they attempted to attack Turkish forces in the region.

In May 2021, the Libyan Foreign Minister Najla Mangoush in a press conference alongside the Turkish Foreign Minister, Mevlut Cavusoglu, called on Turkey to comply with the UN resolutions and withdraw the Turkish troops and mercenaries. The Turkish Foreign Minister responded that the military forces were present under a training agreement reached with the previous government.

In November 2025, Erdoğan told Libyan Prime Minister Dbeibah that Turkey is "closely monitoring" developments in Libya and "will continue to do its part to ensure security and stability." Erdoğan emphasized the importance of cooperation between the two countries in various fields, particularly energy, and stated that they would continue their joint efforts to protect their rights and interests in the Eastern Mediterranean.

== 2026 maritime agreement ==
On 20 October, 2026, Libya's eastern-based House of Representatives unanimously approved the 2019 maritime agreement. According to the European Union, Greece and Egypt this agreement is incompatible with the law of the sea and does not apply legal consequences for third party states.

== See also ==
- Turks in Libya
