= André Naffis-Sahely =

André Naffis-Sahely (born 1985) is a poet, translator, critic and editor. He is from Abu Dhabi, but was born in Venice to an Iranian father and an Italian mother.

Naffis-Sahely is the author of The Promised Land: Poems from Itinerant Life (Penguin UK, 2017), which was described by Pankaj Mishra in The Guardian as a series of "sharp meditations on our vast but remarkably homogeneous global landscape." He is currently Poetry Editor of Poetry London magazine. He is a Visiting Teaching Fellow at Manchester Metropolitan University writing school and was the poetry and reviews editor of Ambit magazine.

Naffis-Sahely's writings have appeared in The Nation, Harper's Magazine, New Statesman, Playboy Magazine, Times Literary Supplement, The Economist, Poetry, The Independent, The Spectator, Areté, P.N. Review, The Chimurenga Chronic and World Literature Today.

Naffis-Sahely has received fellowships from the Fondation Jan Michalski in Switzerland, the MacDowell Colony in the US and Dar al-Ma'mûn in Morocco. His translations include over twenty titles of fiction, poetry and nonfiction from French and Italian, featuring works by Honoré de Balzac, Émile Zola, Tahar Ben Jelloun, Rashid Boudjedra, Abdellatif Laâbi and Alessandro Spina. He has also co-edited The Palm Beach Effect: Reflections on Michael Hofmann (CB Editions, 2013) as well as The Selected Prose of Mick Imlah (Peter Lang, 2015). Several of these projects have been featured as 'Books of the Year' in the Times Literary Supplement, Financial Times, Literary Hub and National Public Radio.

Naffis-Sahely lives in Los Angeles. He is married to writer Zinzi Clemmons.
