= Qasr Ahmad =

Neighborhood in Misrata, Tripolitania, Libya

Qasr Ahmad ميناء قصر أحمد Gasr Ahmed
- Neighborhood
- Location in Libya
- Coordinates: 32°21′30″N 15°12′21″E
- Country: Libya
- Region: Tripolitania
- District: Misrata
- Time zone: UTC+2 (EET)

Qasr Ahmad or Gasr Ahmed (Arabic: ميناء قصر أحمد) is a neighborhood and port in the eastern region of the city of Misrata in northwestern Libya. The neighborhood was developed to provide housing for port workers.

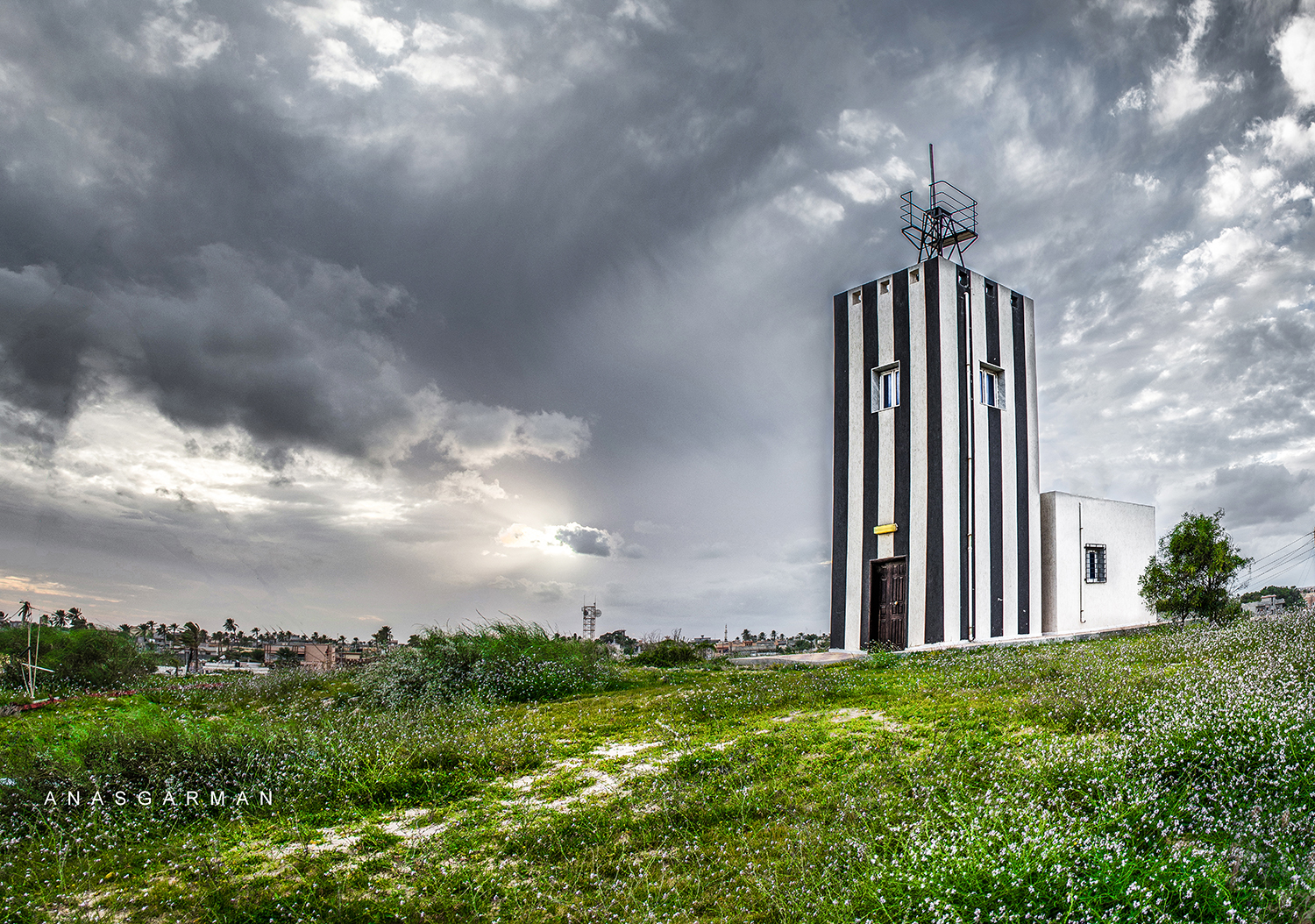
Lighthouse Qaser Ahmed

It is approximately 15 kilometers away from Misrata's city center, and about 250 kilometres away from Tripoli, capital of Libya.

== History ==
=== The Palace of Ahmad ===
Qasr is an Arabic word for palace, and Qasr Ahmad according to the geographer Ayyubid Abu al-feda (1273 -1331) (p. 202) : "Kasr Ahmed is the name of a town in the province of Africa at the beginning of the fourth climate[.] According [to] Sayd Ibn his situation is on the border of the province of the east side of Africa and at the beginning of the country of Barca in the same latitude at a distance of about twelve miles dwellings of Berber family called Misrata. The land is planted with olive and palm trees Residents exporting horses in Alexandria The pilgrims traveling to Mecca the Maghreb face in them very politely Casr Ahmed is properly the name of a village that serves as it store Arabs and where they lock their commodities. From Ahmed Casr we went to Barca in the desert."

The name probably refers Ahmed Arab families from the tribe of Heyyeb s were established at this location.

=== Cephalae Promontorium ===
Development and construction works in Qasr Ahmad revealed ruins of archeological interest, including Phoenician and Roman foundations which prove the existence of a huge wall in the surrounding area. Pre-construction clearing below the lighthouse removed the overburden that had buried Roman coins, pottery, and room formations that are believed to be Roman baths, which are remains of the Roman station port of Cephalae Promontorium.

=== Libyan-Arab Spring "17th Feb. Revolution" against Gaddafi ===
In May 2011, during the First Libyan Civil War, Gaddafi's forces planned an overnight attack on Qasr Ahmad with pesticide-spraying planes.

== Ports ==
Qasr Ahmad Port of Misrata
- Interactive map of Qasr Ahmad; Port of Misrata

Location
- Country: Libya
- Location: Misrata District
- Coordinates: 32°21′50″N 15°13′08″E

Details
- Operated by: Qasr Ahmad Port Authority
- Owned by: Socialist Ports Company
- Size: Small

Port of Libyan Iron and Steel Company
- Interactive map of Port of Libyan Iron and Steel Company

Location
- Country: Libya
- Location: Misrata District
- Coordinates: 32°20′39″N 15°14′24″E

Details
- Operated by: Libyan Iron and Steel Company
- Owned by: Libyan Iron and Steel Company
- Main trades: Iron and Steel

Qasr Ahmad is famous for being the location of the Port of Misrata, which holds its name, but the total number of ports in Qasr Ahmad is two.

=== Port of Misrata ===
The Port of Misrata, also known as the Port of Qasr Ahmed, is one of the major business centers in Libya. The port is one of the most important maritime and ship transport centers in North Africa, being the major sea entrance to Libya. It is also the seat of the Libyan Ports Company. The port has a capacity is 6,000,000 mt per year, with a maximum draft of 11m and a total berth length of 3,550m.

=== Port of Libyan Iron and Steel Company ===
Constructed as an extension to the Port of Misrata, the Port of LISCO is totally owned and operated by the Libyan Iron and Steel Company, serving its imports, and export services.

== Business Importance ==
Qasr Ahmad is the location of major commercial and financial activities of the Libya government, being the ground soil of the first Libyan free economic zone project, the headquarters and factories of the Libyan Iron and Steel Company, and the administration of major private Libyan banks.

=== Misrata Free Zone ===
It's a zone free of any restrictions such as tax, custom duties, commercial and monetary restrictions, among others, established by decision of people's committee General No (495) 2000 and reorganized by decision of General People's Committee.

The free zone was established in order to vary and support the national income sources by attracting the investments to Great Jamahiriya in an environment free of management and fiscal restrictions development of commercial, goods and service exchange and creating an industrial base in addition to transporting and setting technology and training upon it and providing work opportunities for the citizens and with this zone and its development will increase opportunities of attracting the investors in industrial, service and commercial activities which target the African market to settle their investments in Jamahiriya.

Misrata Free Zone extends to 3539 hectares (8745.06 acres), including Misrata Seaport with a capability of expansion in the southern side up to more than 2000 hectares (4942.1 acres).

=== Libyan Iron and Steel Company ===
The Libyan Iron and Steel Company (LISCO) is one of the largest iron and steelmaking companies operating in North Africa. Based in Misurata, it is subsidized and owned by the Libyan government. Muammar Gaddafi officially laid LISCO's foundation stone on 18 September 1979. In 2004, the online magazine Arab Steel ranked Lisco ranked third among the largest Arab iron and steel companies.

The company operates from a headquarters building, five factories, a sea port, and warehouses in Qasr Ahmad.
