= Thubactis =

Ancient city in modern-day Libya

- Location within Libya
- 32.371127°N 15.1444275°E
- Location: Misurata Thubactis
- Region: Libya

Thubactis was a city founded by the Phoenicians about 3,000 years ago some 210 km east of the Libyan city of Tripoli. It was located near the present-day city of Misurata. Located on the Mediterranean Sea, it was used as a commercial station.
