= Darf Publishers =

British publishing house

- Parent company: Dar Fergiani publishing house
- Founded: 1980
- Founder: Mohammed Bashir Fergiani
- Country of origin: United Kingdom
- Headquarters location: West Hampstead; London, NW6
- Distribution: United Kingdom, Republic of Ireland, Libya, Egypt
- Publication types: Books
- Fiction genres: Literature, History, Translation
- Official website: http://darfpublishers.co.uk/

Darf Publishers is an independent British publishing house established in London in 1980 focusing on publishing books on the Middle East, North Africa and the Arab World in English. Initially, most of Darf's books were facsimile editions of rare 18th and 19th century books, covering topics such as history, sociology, literature and languages, culture, and sport.

== Origins ==
Darf was established in London in 1980 by the Libyan publishing entrepreneur Mohammed Fergiani as the English imprint of the Arabic language Dar Fergiani publishing house (from which Darf takes its name) which he established in Libya, and later in Egypt, in 1952. Dar Fergiani operated in Libya until it was forced out of the country by the Gaddafi regime, due to the targeting and banning of privately owned publishing companies. Fergiani emigrated to London in the late 1970s, returning to Libya in the 1990s to reopen several bookshops and to continue Dar Fergiani's publishing operations in Libya and several other Arab countries.

== Early Publications ==
Since its inception in 1980 Darf has focused on publishing books on Libya, the Middle East, and the Arab World in English. The firm has more than 200 titles in its back catalogue of facsimile editions of rare and out of print 18th and 19th century books, mainly dealing with history, sociology, literature and languages, culture, and sport. Darf has also published books in other languages such as Italian on the history of Libya and the Middle East.

== New Publications ==
The firm's relaunch of its publishing operations in 2009 has primarily focused on translating and publishing literature by emerging Middle Eastern, North African, and European writers.

Among its new publications are Chewing Gum (novel) by Mansour Bushnaf, African Titanics by Abu Bakr Khaal and Maps of the Soul by Ahmed Fagih. Darf have also published the first English translation of Confines of the Shadow by Italian novelist Alessandro Spina.

In 2017 Darf expanded its scope by acquiring rights to the English translation of Chiisai ouchi (The Little House) by Japanese author Kyoko Nakajima.
