= Alessandro Spina =

Italian writer of Syrian origin (1927–2013)

- Born: Basili Shafik Khouzam; 1927; Benghazi, Libya
- Died: 2013 (aged 85–86)
- Occupations: Novelist, Businessman
- Writing career
- Pen name: Alessandro Spina
- Notable works: I confini dell'ombra (The Confines of the Shadow, 2006)
- Notable awards: Bagutta Prize (2007)

Alessandro Spina (1927–2013) was the pen name of Basili Shafik Khouzam. Born in Benghazi into a family of Syrian Maronites that originally hailed from Aleppo, Syria, Khouzam was educated in Milan and published his first story in Nuovi Argomenti. Following his return to Benghazi in 1954, Khouzam spent the next twenty-five years managing his father's textile factory in Benghazi while continuing to write in his spare time. Khouzam eventually left Libya in 1979 and retired to Franciacorta, Italy.

Khouzam was associated with various leading Italian writers of his time, including Alberto Moravia, Giorgio Bassani, Vittorio Sereni, and Claudio Magris and his novels were published by various imprints such as Mondadori and Garzanti. His major opus was I confini dell'ombra, a sequence of eleven historical novels and short story collections that chart the history of his native city from the Italo-Turkish War in 1911 to the exploitation of Libya's vast oil reserves in 1964. Although Khouzam individually published each instalment of his epic throughout the 1970s and 1980s, the entire sequence was finally issued as a 1268-page omnibus edition by Morcelliana in 2006 and was awarded the Bagutta Prize in 2007. His work has been compared to that of Paul Bowles and Albert Cossery

== Works ==
- Tempo e Corruzione (Garzanti, 1962)
- I confini dell'ombra. In terra d'oltremare (Morcelliana, 2006)
- Diario Di Lavoro: Alle Origini De I Confini Dell'ombra (Morcelliana, 2010)
- L'ospitalità intellettuale (Morcelliana, 2012)
- Elogio dell'inattuale (Morcelliana, 2013)

== Translations ==
I confini dell'ombra was translated into English by André Naffis-Sahely as The Confines of the Shadow. Volume 1 of 3 is available from DARF Publishers. Spina has also been translated into French. The first three novels of The Confines of the Shadow were translated by Gérard Genot as Triptyque Libyen (L'Âge d'Homme, 2013), while one of his short stories appeared in a translation by Michel Balzamo as Juin 1940 (Éditions de L'Herne, 2009).
