= Laila Neihoum =

Libyan writer, journalist, editor and poet

- Born: Neihoum born 1961
- Citizenship: Libya
- Occupations: Journalist; Writer; Poet; Editor
- Employer: University of Iowa
- Notable work: Butterflies; Melting Sun; O My Libya

Laila Neihoum (Arabic: ليلى النيهوم, born 1961) is a Libyan writer, journalist, editor and poet.

== Career ==
Neihoum is recognised a leading woman in re-shaping the literature scene in Libya. She was the first writer from there to be accepted to join the International Writers Programme at the University of Iowa. She has published online and in print, including a collection of poems and a collection of short stories. Her poetry reflects modern life in Libya, with poems like Butterflies of Meaning reflecting family and friendship. Melting Sun discusses parental expectations.

Neihoum has written about the Arab Spring and its impact on Libya. She wrote O My Libya in 2011, to create a poetic manifesto for her country. She is widely recognised in Libya and a leading contemporary writer and is also commentator on the arts scene in Libya.

== Journalism ==
Regular commentary and editorial published in outlets in Libya, including “Albait,” “Almouatamer,” “Almajal” and “Four Seasons.” Neihoum also publishes literary criticism. She has edited Tesenon a collection of young Libyan poets writing in the 1990s and a collections of global short stories Ofoq min lazaward (Azure Horizons).
