= Misrata =

Misrata مصراتة
- City
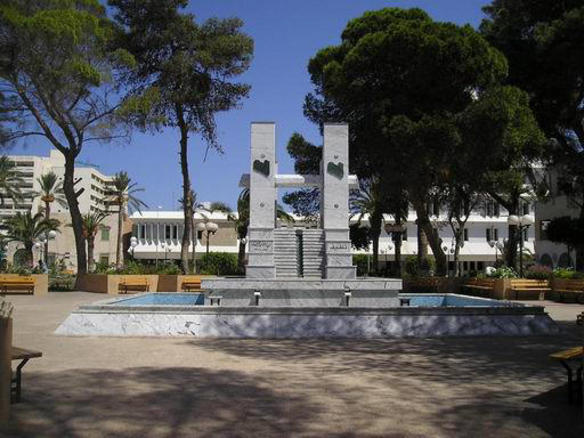
- A central park in Misrata, 2007
- Nicknames: Ḏāt ar-Rimāl (ذات الرمال, "the Sandy One"); aṣ-Ṣumūd (الصمود, "the Strongholds"); Madīnat aš-Šuhadāʾ (مدينة الشهداء, "the City of Martyrs")
- Location in Libya
- Coordinates: 32°22′39.12″N 15°05′31.26″E
- Country: Libya
- Region: Tripolitania
- District: Misrata

Government
  - Mayor: Mahmoud Sagutry
- Elevation: 10 m (33 ft)

Population (2020)
  - Total: 881,000
- Demonym: Misrati
- Time zone: UTC+2 (EET)
- Area code: 31
- License Plate Code: 3
- Website: misrata.gov.ly

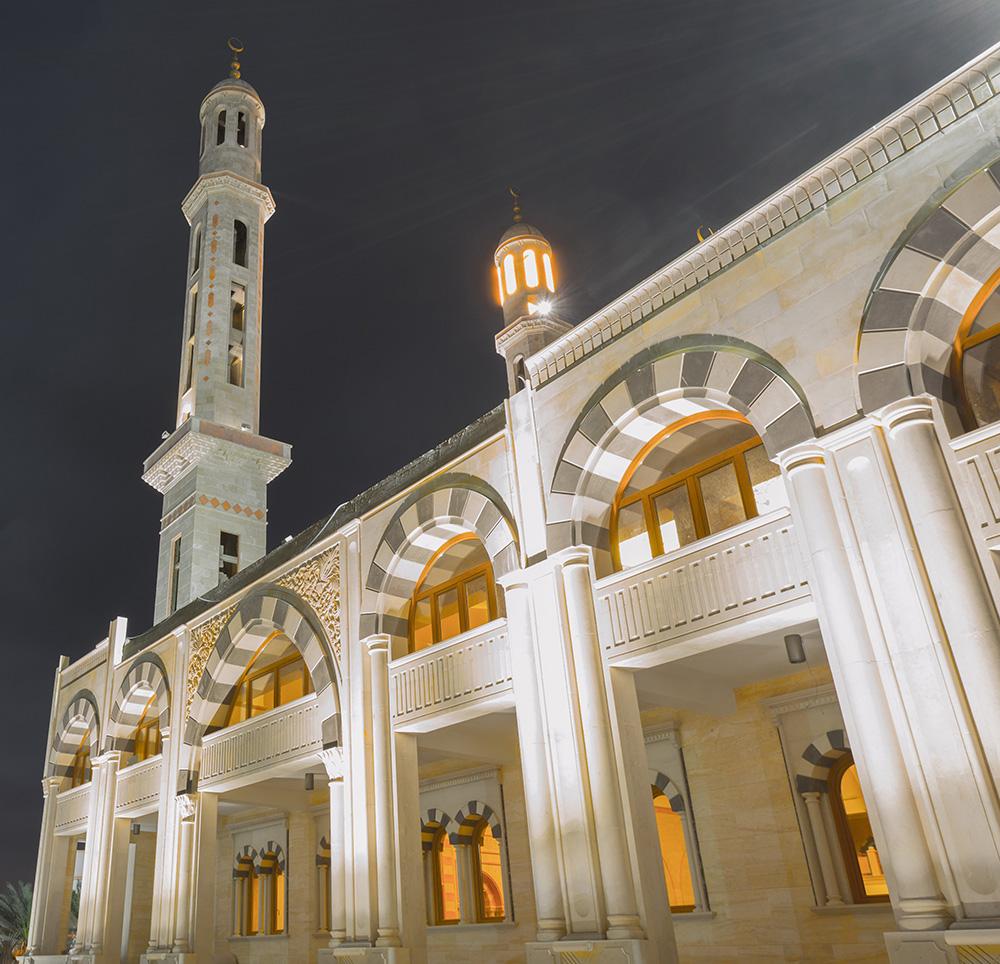
Mosque of Raidat, Misrata, Libya

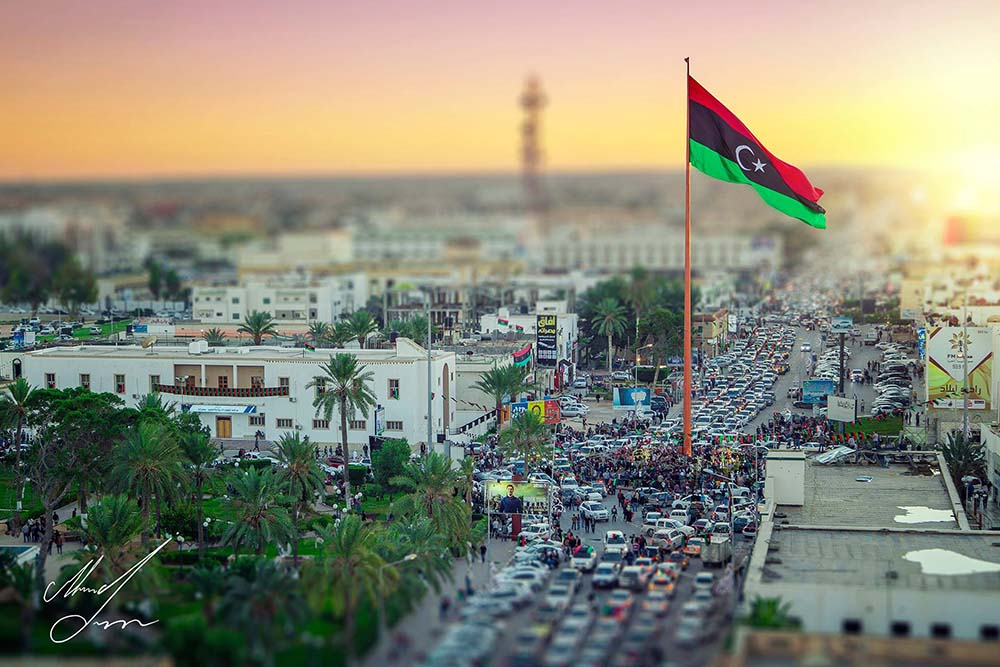
Misrata Downtown Square

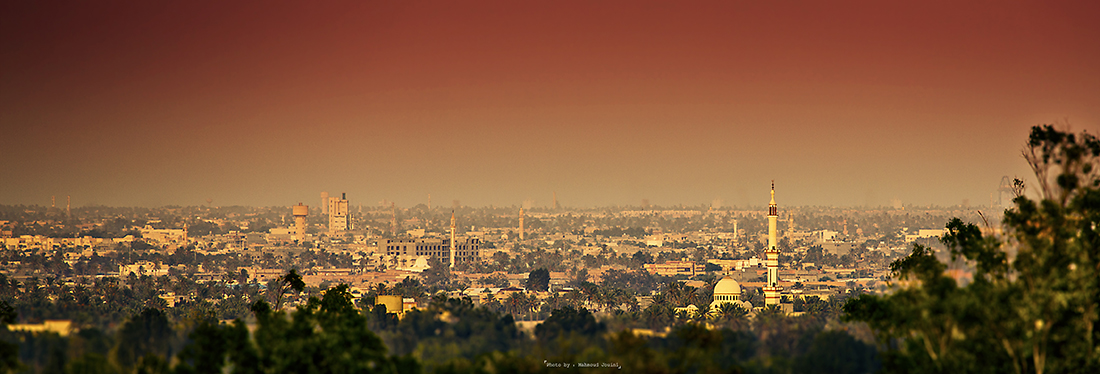
General view of Misrata city

Misrata (/mɪsˈrɑːtə/ miss-RAH-tə; Arabic: مصراتة, romanized: Miṣrāta, Libyan Arabic: Məṣrāta; also spelled Misratah and known by the Italian spelling Misurata, is a city in northwestern Libya located in the Misrata District, situated 187 km (116 mi) to the east of Tripoli on the Mediterranean coast near Cape Misrata. With a population of about 881,000, it is the third-largest city in Libya, after Tripoli and Benghazi. It is the capital city of the Misrata District and has been called the economic and trade capital of Libya. Its harbor is at Qasr Ahmad.

== Etymology ==
The name "Misrata ⵎⵙⵔⴰⵜⴰ" derives from the Misrata tribe, a section of the larger Berber Hawwara confederacy, whose homeland in Antiquity and the early Islamic period was coastal Tripolitania.

"Trirone Acrone", the oldest description mentioned by Ptolemy III Euergetes of Misrata because it consists of three heads of land stretching into the sea depth, and got Misrata importance by being at the crossroads of many convoys and also because it is in the middle of an agricultural area with the name of "Cephalae Promentorium" (Kevalay) of the Greek geographer Strabo. And the city of Misrata is one of the commercial stations that have been built by the Phoenicians, since more than 3000 years (The Tenth Century BC) to the north-western parts of the Libyan coast. The flag then by the name of Thubactis Misrata and know that name in relation to the Berber tribe of Misurata (The Misurateens), which means the sailors.

== History ==
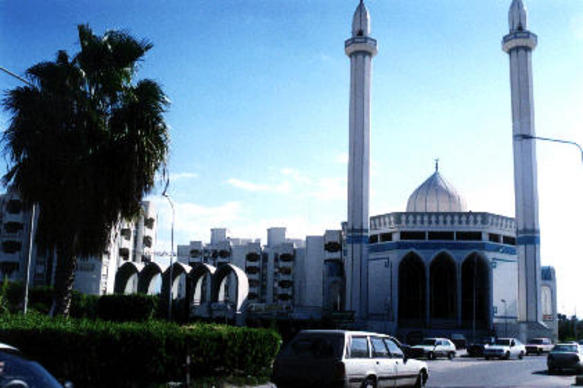
The main mosque at Misrata

=== Early history ===
Modern Misrata was established around the 7th century AD during the beginning of modern Libya's rule by the Caliphate. Some contemporary sources claim the town existed prior to Islamic rule, during the Roman Empire era and that its initial Arabic name derived from its Roman name Thubactis. David Mattingly, author of Tripolitania, a comprehensive reference book on northwestern Libya, stated that identification of Misrata as the ancient Thubactis is particularly problematic, complicated and "defies an easy answer." Nonetheless, the Roman town was located at some point on the oasis upon which the modern city sits. The two common identifications are at the eastern and western anchorages of modern Misrata or south and inland of the city, respectively. The Roman town was recorded as one of the six municipia (small self-governing cities) of the Tripolitania province, a rank below coloniae (cities with full citizenship rights.)

In any case, in the 7th century, Misrata served as a caravan supply center and an important port. Merchant traders from Misrata were well known throughout the Sahara during the years of the Caliphate (7th–19th centuries). In addition to its strategic location, the city established itself as one of Libya's oldest producers of luxury carpets. The Misrata tribe, a section of the larger Berber Hawwara confederacy, inhabited the coastal region of Tripolitania during the Roman and early Arab eras.

=== Ottoman era ===
The region of Tripolitania, which included Misrata, came under the regency of the Ottoman Empire in 1551. By the beginning of the 19th century, Misrata had established itself as a major center for the Trans-Saharan trade route, where caravans carrying gold, leather, and slaves regularly stopped. Because of the rainfall along the coast, which was abundant compared to other cities in Tripolitania, and supplemental water from springs, Misrata's inhabitants were able to engage in unusually fertile agriculture in this largely arid region. The city was filled with thick areas of vegetable gardens while the surrounding countryside included fields of wheat, barley, date palms and olive orchards. Misrata's artisans also expanded on the city's ancient carpet industry for which it was regionally renowned. Although Misrata contained a well-built harbor, most of its long-distance trade was overland because the city of Benghazi to the east served as the preferable substitute for maritime shipping.

As a result of the abolition of slavery and increasing European colonial influence in Sub-Saharan Africa, Trans-Saharan trade declined and consequently Misrata's role in the trade decreased. However, the decline in Trans-Saharan trade saw the establishment of weekly and permanent markets in the city, replacing the seasonal markets associated with long-distance trade. Because of this new economic situation, the residents of the countryside devoted less time to pastoralism, husbandry and guide service for foreign traders and began to shift their focus on agricultural production. Farmers concentrated on growing cash crops, relying on market relations to provide income for their families, instead of subsistence farming and periodic barter exchanging. Bedouins increasingly abandoned their nomadic lifestyle and began to settle into permanent dwellings within the city limits. To cope with a rising population due to immigration from the surrounding areas, Misrata witnessed a construction boom in the late 19th century. A covered produce market and numerous streets lined with shops were built in addition to new district and municipal government offices, a renovated Ottoman army barracks and several Turkish-style houses for the city's wealthy families.

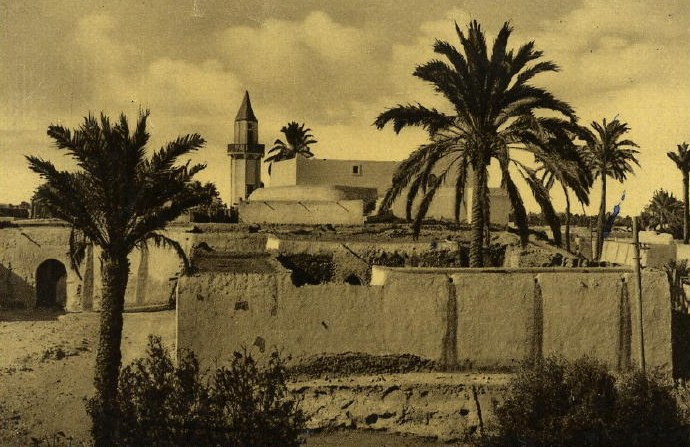
The Old City of Misrata, 1930s

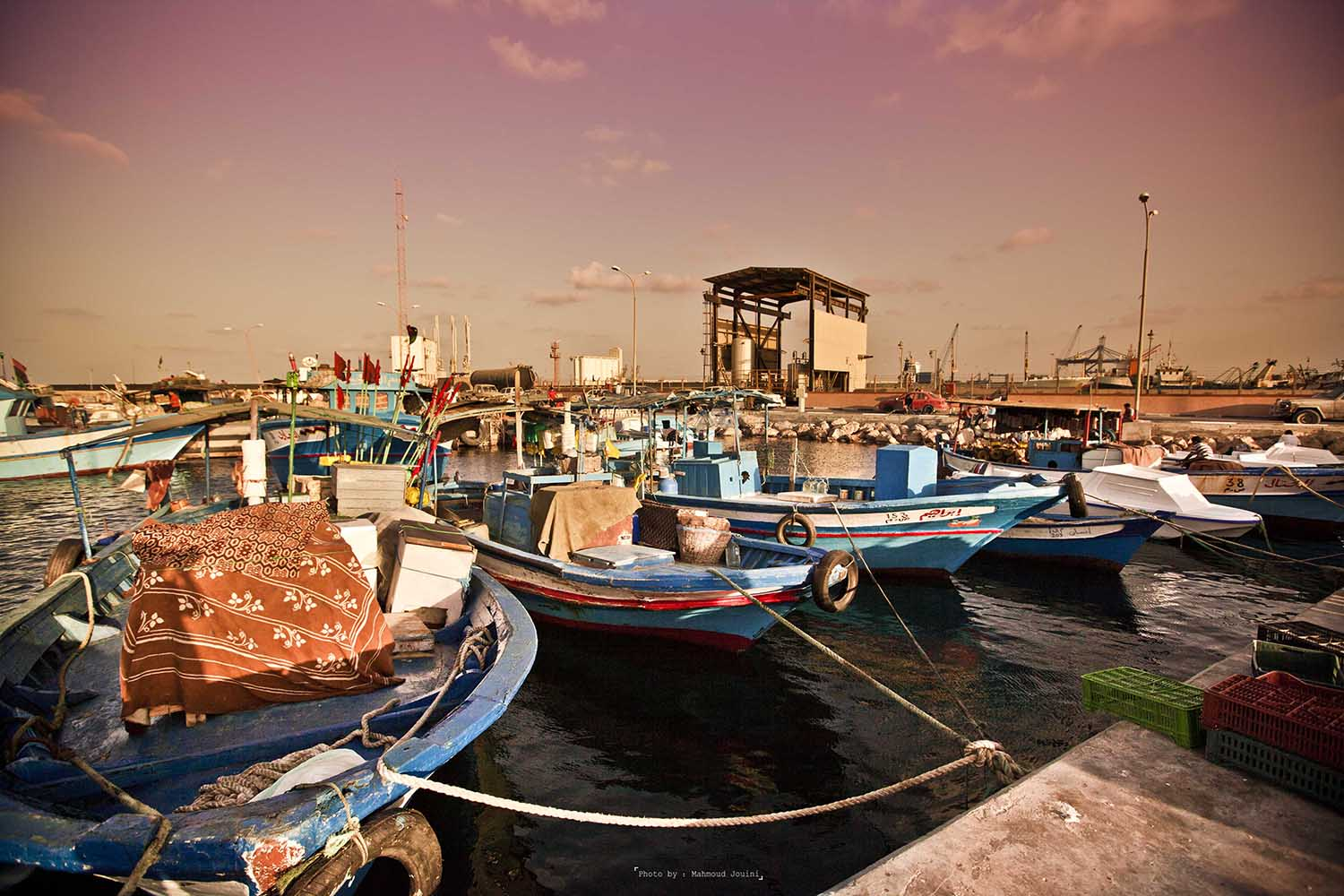
Misrata Sea fishing port

Two clans, the Muntasir and Adgham, dominated the political, social and economic aspects of Misrata and led the local tribes against their Turkish overlords during various periods of tension. There were many wealthy families in the city, but the Muntasirs, who were of Arabian descent, and the Adghams, who descended from Ottoman officers who settled in the province in previous centuries, were the most prominent. They made their income from commerce and protected their wealth by cooperating with the Ottoman provincial authorities. Both had extended families and economic holdings not just in Misrata, but also the provincial capital of Tripoli as well as the eastern Cyrenican towns of Benghazi and Derna. The Aghdams had traditionally resisted efforts by the central Ottoman government in Istanbul to reestablish direct control over Tripoli Province and, under the leadership of Osman al-Aghdam, they led a rebellion against the Ottomans and their local allies in 1835. After their eventual defeat in 1858, they were left in an inferior position to that of the Muntasirs. The Aghdams remained a powerful force nonetheless and their competition with the Muntasirs for leading positions within the local and regional government dominated Misratan politics. Misrata's urban residents did not contribute much to the political scene and avoided contact with the Ottoman authorities out of concern of conscription into the army and provincial tax collection. In contrast, the rural areas of Misrata were populated mostly by fellahin (peasantry) and former Bedouins who had retained their tribal affiliations and loyalties and thus involved themselves in competition for political influence.

Up until 1908, the Muntasirs, led by Umar al-Muntasir, controlled the upper echelons of the newly organized bureaucracy in Tripoli Province and were largely accepted by the local notables as the administrators of Misrata along with Sirte, Gharyan and Tarhuna. However, that year, the Young Turks acquired power in Istanbul and ousted the traditional Ottoman leadership. Viewing the Muntasirs as loyalists of Sultan Abdul Hamid II, the ousted sultan, they made efforts to reduce Muntasir power in the region. The Young Turk administration in Tripoli vetoed Muntasir membership in the local parliament and dismissed the governor of Tarhuna who was Umar al-Muntasir's son, Ahmad Dhiya al-Muntasir, from his post. In addition, they allegedly hired a group of local Misratans to assassinate Abd al-Qasim, another one Umar's sons.

=== Italian occupation ===
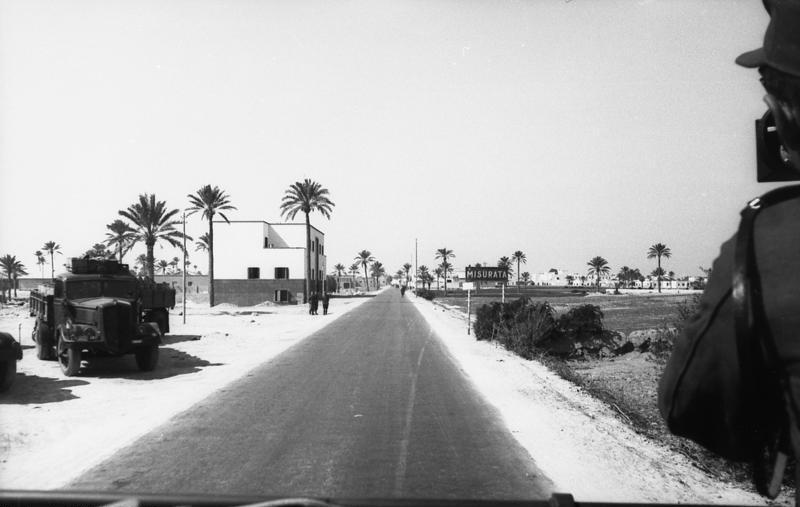
Entrance to Misrata, 1941

In October 1911, Italy had launched an invasion against Ottoman Tripolitania, but were unable to reach Misrata until June 1912. Ahmad Dhiya al-Muntasir had consulted with the Italians in Rome months prior to the invasion and Umar al-Muntasir used his influence to coordinate with them militarily once they landed on the Libyan coastline. In return for their collaboration, the Muntasirs were able to maintain their administrative role and gained positions as advisers to the Italian military authorities.

During World War I, Misrata played an important role in the Libyan-Ottoman resistance against the occupying Italian Army. Under the leadership of Ramadan al-Swehli, the city was used a base of support for the Ottoman Empire and his Misratan army dealt a major blow to the Italians at Qasr Abu Hadi near Sirte in April 1915. Over 500 Italian troops were killed while Swehli's troops captured over 5,000 rifles, various types of machine guns and artillery and several tons of ammunition. As a result of this Libyan victory, Italy's army and their Muntasir allies withdrew from Misrata. By 1916, Misrata had become semi-autonomous and collected taxes from Sirte, the region of Fezzan and the area between it and Sirte as well as the Warfalla tribal area south of Tripoli. Because of its strategic harbor, Ottoman and German forces used Misrata as one of their principal supply ports during World War I. The city became the headquarters of a wide-ranging administration which supervised military recruitment and tax collection, had its own ammunition factory, printed its own currency and operated its own schools and hospitals. However, once Nuri Bey, the Ottoman officer in charge of the Libyan front, was recalled to Istanbul in early 1918, Ottoman influence waned in Misrata. Suwayhli lost his main backer and a huge source of funding as a result.

Although the Italians reestablished their control of much of Libya following their victory in World War I, al-Swehli retained his position as administrator of Misrata. In 1920 he expelled his Italian adviser from Misrata and controlled the town independently with about 10,000 fighters. Al Rakib, a Tripoli-based newspaper, commended the order and security in place at Misrata under al-Swehli as well as the strict application of Islamic law including the suppression of hard liquor. In June, however, al-Swehli attempted to attack the Muntasirs and Warfalla in the area between Misrata and Tripoli, but his forces were defeated and al-Swehli was executed by Abd al-Qadir al-Muntasir's troops. A few weeks after the battle, the new Italian governor attacked Misrata.

During the mid-1920s and 1930s, Misrata became a center of Italian colonization. A new town was laid out on a grid pattern and several public buildings were constructed including a new municipal office, the first hospital of the area, a modern state-of-the-art church (which was later converted to a mosque) and a large hotel. Giuseppe Volpi was named Conte di Misrata, or the "Count of Misrata." In 1935 the construction of the road connecting Zuwara in the west to Misrata was completed. Later in 1937 was built the Via Balbia, a main road that connected Misrata with Tripoli and Benghazi, and in 1938 Libya governor Italo Balbo created on the outskirts of Misrata the new cities of "Gioda" and "Crispi".

In January 1939, the Kingdom of Italy created the Fourth Shore, with Libya's four coastal provinces of Tripoli, Misrata, Bengasi, and Derna becoming an integral part of metropolitan Italy. The last railway development in Libya done by the Italians was the "Tripoli-Benghazi line" that was started in 1941 and was never completed because of the Italian defeat during World War II: a new railway station was built in Misrata, but was destroyed by the British attacks in 1942.

=== Independence ===
United Kingdom of Libya was born out of the independence movement. In response to alleged vote rigging during the 1952 parliamentary elections, Misrata witnessed mass riots which contributed to the Libyan monarchy's permanent ban on political parties.

Following Muammar Gaddafi's coup that overthrew the monarchy of King Idris in 1969, Misrata grew rapidly from the 1970s onward. Two iron and steel mills were established in the city resulting in a mass migration of Libyans from nearby rural areas to Misrata and consequently generated population and economic growth. The marina was rapidly developed to host shipping to service the steel plants and other factories with raw materials and other goods.

During this period Misrata became the principal economic, educational and administrative center of eastern Tripolitania. The majority of government ministries have branch offices in the city in addition to several college universities, schools and hospitals. The commercial area of Misrata contains numerous shops, restaurants, and cafes. The extensive development of the city attracted large numbers of immigrants to Misrata, giving it a cosmopolitan atmosphere. The main square adjacent to the old souk resembles those of major Moroccan cities.

=== Revolution ===
Starting on 20 February 2011, small demonstrations took place in Misrata in solidarity with anti-government protesters in Benghazi. Libyan police immediately arrested the Misratan protesters, sparking larger demonstrations which Libyan government forces sought to quell using live ammunition. Within a few days, 70 protesters were killed provoking outrage among the city's inhabitants. By 24 February, Benghazi fell under the control of anti-Gaddafi forces in the Libyan uprising against Gaddafi. That same day, Gaddafi regime forces attempted to wrest control of the city, but were repelled.

The battle was renewed with shelling on 20 March as pro-Gaddafi tanks and artillery pushed forward and besieged Misrata. Eyewitnesses reported that pro-Gaddafi soldiers were shooting, killing and injuring unarmed civilians. The city was shelled by artillery, tanks, and snipers for over 40 days and had its water supply shut off by Gaddafi's forces. By late April, over 1,000 people in the city were reported killed while around 3,000 were injured. With air support from NATO which entered the conflict on the rebels' side on March 19, and a vital sea-based life line from neighbouring country the Island of Malta, anti-Gaddafi forces managed to force loyalist troops to retreat on April 21, gaining control of most of the city by mid-May.

Thereafter, forces from Misrata played an important role in other theaters of the war, such as the Battle of Tripoli, the Battle of Sirte and the Battle of Bani Walid (2011).

== Geography ==
Misrata lies on the coast of the Mediterranean Sea 187 km (116 mi) east of Tripoli and 825 km (513 mi) west of Benghazi. The location of the city creates a dualism of sea and sand, bounded by the sea to the north and east and to the south by golden sands dotted with palm and olive trees.

Like Benghazi and Tripoli, Misrata is divided into two distinct sections. Older Misrata consists of small stone houses and narrow arched streets while the newer part of the city, which began to develop in the 20th century, consists of modern buildings, homes, factories and industrial areas. Aside from its distinct location, which makes it a centre for the exchange of commodities and materials with the rest of the cities of the country, Misrata has modern infrastructure, including paved roads, electricity and communications.

=== Climate ===
The Köppen-Geiger climate classification system classifies Misrata's climate as a hot semi-arid climate (BSh).

Climate data for Misrata (misurata port) (1991–2020 normals, extremes 1925–2020)
Month	Jan	Feb	Mar	Apr	May	Jun	Jul	Aug	Sep	Oct	Nov	Dec	Year
Record high °C (°F)	30.0 (86.0)	36.1 (97.0)	40.0 (104.0)	45.0 (113.0)	45.1 (113.2)	51.1 (124.0)	47.5 (117.5)	48.9 (120.0)	47.8 (118.0)	46.1 (115.0)	36.7 (98.1)	32.4 (90.3)	51.1 (124.0)
Mean daily maximum °C (°F)	18.0 (64.4)	18.7 (65.7)	21.1 (70.0)	23.8 (74.8)	27.1 (80.8)	30.0 (86.0)	31.7 (89.1)	32.5 (90.5)	31.6 (88.9)	29.0 (84.2)	24.0 (75.2)	19.5 (67.1)	25.6 (78.1)
Daily mean °C (°F)	13.9 (57.0)	14.3 (57.7)	16.5 (61.7)	19.1 (66.4)	22.2 (72.0)	25.2 (77.4)	27.3 (81.1)	28.2 (82.8)	27.3 (81.1)	24.5 (76.1)	19.5 (67.1)	15.4 (59.7)	21.1 (70.0)
Mean daily minimum °C (°F)	9.8 (49.6)	9.9 (49.8)	11.8 (53.2)	14.3 (57.7)	17.3 (63.1)	20.4 (68.7)	23.0 (73.4)	23.9 (75.0)	23.0 (73.4)	19.9 (67.8)	15.0 (59.0)	11.2 (52.2)	16.6 (61.9)
Record low °C (°F)	−1.0 (30.2)	−1.0 (30.2)	0.1 (32.2)	0.1 (32.2)	6.3 (43.3)	10.1 (50.2)	13.9 (57.0)	16.0 (60.8)	12.0 (53.6)	6.9 (44.4)	3.0 (37.4)	−0.7 (30.7)	−1.0 (30.2)
Average precipitation mm (inches)	91.6 (3.61)	51.1 (2.01)	42.5 (1.67)	9.5 (0.37)	3.4 (0.13)	1.7 (0.07)	0.0 (0.0)	1.6 (0.06)	31.8 (1.25)	38.7 (1.52)	59.4 (2.34)	63.3 (2.49)	394.6 (15.54)
Average precipitation days (≥ 1.0 mm)	6.6	5.5	3.2	1.6	0.6	0.4	0.0	0.3	1.4	3.3	4.6	7.2	34.7
Average relative humidity (%)	68.7	68.6	68.6	67.1	68.2	69.3	71.1	71.1	69.4	68.2	67.1	67.7	68.8
Average dew point °C (°F)	8.0 (46.4)	8.0 (46.4)	9.8 (49.6)	11.7 (53.1)	14.9 (58.8)	18.3 (64.9)	21.2 (70.2)	22.2 (72.0)	20.7 (69.3)	17.2 (63.0)	12.3 (54.1)	8.9 (48.0)	14.4 (57.9)
Mean monthly sunshine hours	182.9	217.5	238.7	255.0	316.2	303.0	378.2	353.4	273.0	238.7	213.0	179.8	3,149.4
Mean daily sunshine hours	5.9	7.7	7.7	8.5	10.2	10.1	12.2	11.4	9.1	7.7	7.1	5.8	8.6
Source 1: NOAA
Source 2: Deutscher Wetterdienst (extremes 1925–1989), Arab Meteorology Book (sun only)

== Demographics ==
The city is considered to be the "main center of the Turkish-origin community in Libya"; in total, the Turks form approximately two-thirds (est.270,000 in 2019) of Misrata's 400,000 inhabitants.

== Economy ==
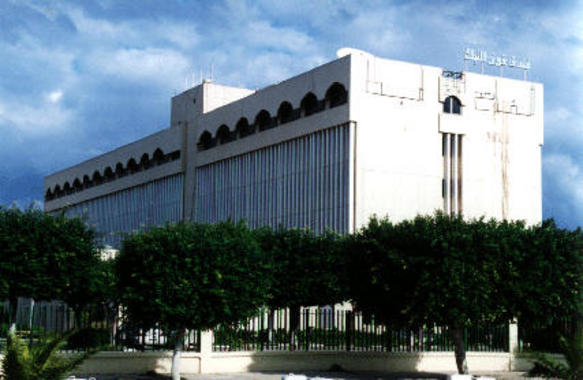
Goz Teek Hotel in Misrata

Serving the role of Libya's commercial hub, Misrata is notably clean and construction is well-organized. Its citizens are largely viewed by other Libyans as business oriented. The city's steel mill industry (which is dominated by the government-owned Libyan Iron and Steel Company) is one its principal income producers and sources of employment. Due to the 1970s-80s renovation of Misrata's marina to better supply the industrial plants with raw material, the industry has been able to expand and the steel mill authorities hold considerable influence in the city. Al-Naseem Dairy, one of the largest private companies in Libya, is also located in Misrata and employs around 750 workers.

A historic aspect of the local economy is the cloth and textile industry. Situated near the city's central square are souks ("open-air markets") where, usually three times a week, merchants continue to sell luxury carpets, furniture cloth and traditional clothing, including abayas (cloaks worn by males for celebratory occasions.)

Most major businesses, shops and social centers are located on Tripoli Street, Misrata's main thoroughfare. During the Siege of Misrata, most of the buildings housing these assets were destroyed. However, several small businesses are beginning to rebuild and reopen. Nonetheless, recovery remains relatively slow partially due to the shortage of banknotes since Libyan banks are only allowing citizens to withdraw or borrow limited amounts of funds. Once the Libyan Central Bank receives most of the assets that had been internationally frozen during the civil war, it is probable that local banks would ease these restrictions.

The city has a great potential for expansion since it attracts a lot of internal immigration and is surrounded by uninhabited flat land with no obstacles. It is home to Misrata Airport, one of Libya's largest airports. There is a port in the neighbouring town of Qasr Ahmad. Misrata is the seat of many national companies such as the Libyan Ports Company, Libyan Iron and Steel Company, the Libyan publishing, distribution and Advertising Company. Besides that, it has branches of public and private sector banks and one locally and privately owned bank.

== Government ==
Misrata is governed by a local council consisting of 28 seats. The city held its first free elections on 20 February 2012 after a month of organizing. It was the first major city to hold local elections in post-Gaddafi Libya while other cities had their municipal officials by the national interim government. Voter registration was at 101,486 and the number of candidates was 28, all of whom were independents. The mayor of Misrata during the civil war was Khalifa al-Zwawy, while first elected mayor became Yousef Ben Yousef.

== Education ==
Misurata University, with its 15 faculties, is located in the city of Misrata. There are several higher education institutions including a number of university faculties that are administratively linked to universities of other cities in Libya. Misurata University is a modern university which was established in 1983, persisting a long-term goal to have an educated community and to end illiteracy and innumeracy in society. Despite its short age, the university has gained excellence in providing the knowledge and skills required for higher education studies, and has enjoyed a great reputation for the teaching, research and training it provides. It has constantly topped the university rankings league in Libya and was recently ranked first in Libya and the 55th in Africa according to the Webometrics Rankings 2013. (e.g. Al-Tahadi University of Sirte and Tripoli University of Tripoli).

== Sports clubs ==
- Asswehly Sports Club (founded 1944)
- Alittihad Misurata Sports Club (founded 1965)
- Alahly Misurata Sports Club (founded 1974)
- Assabah Sports Club (founded 1976)
- Attahaddy Misurata Sports Club (founded 1979)
- Annajem Arrefi Sports Club (founded 1979)
- Aschumooe Sports Club (founded 1982)
- Attasaddy Misurata Sports Club (founded 1983)
- Aljihad Sports Club (founded 1984)
- Assakhra Sports Club (founded 1984)

== Transport ==
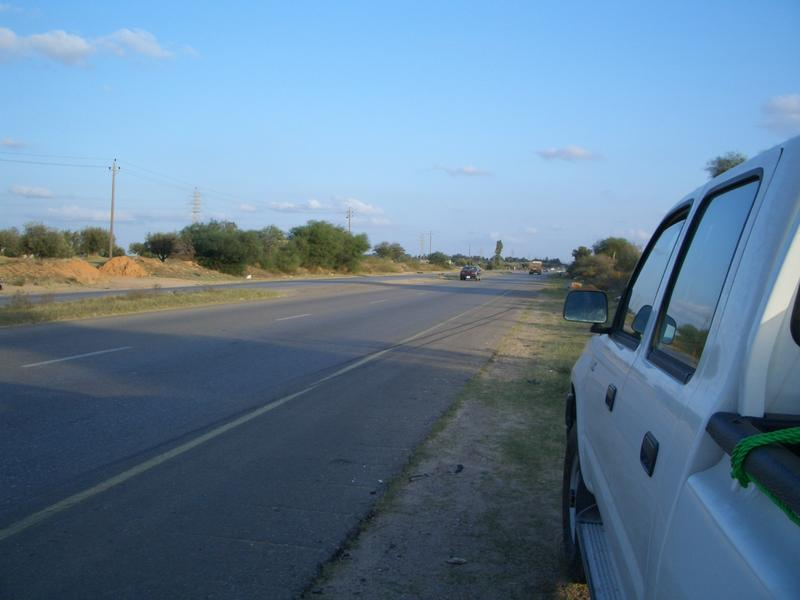
The Libyan Coastal Highway leading to Misrata from the capital Tripoli

A railway line was proposed in 2008 but as of 2016 no actual construction had taken place. It is also served by Misrata Airport.

In September 2019 an express bus service was launched connecting the airport to Tripoli.

== Notable people ==
- Ahmad Zarruq
- Ali Elmusrati
- Ramadan Asswehly

== See also ==
- Apostolic Prefecture of Misurata, pre-diocesan Catholic jurisdiction
- List of cities in Libya
- Transport in Libya
- Tripolitania

== Bibliography ==
- Azema, James (2000). Libya Handbook. Footprint Travel Guides. ISBN 1-900949-77-6.
- Ben-Ghiat, Ruth; Fuller, Mia, eds. (2008). Italian Colonialism. Macmillan. ISBN 978-0-230-60636-4.
- Burke, Edmund (1993). Struggle and Survival in the Modern Middle East. University of California Press. ISBN 0-520-07988-4.
- Hubbard, Monica M. (1993). Cities of the World: Africa. Gale Research Inc. ISBN 0-8103-7100-6.
- Mattingly, David (1995). Tripolitania. University of Michigan Press. ISBN 978-0472106585.
- Reclus, Elisee (1887). The Earth and Its Inhabitants, Africa: North-west Africa. D. Appleton. ISBN 9780665401992.
