= Chewing Gum (novel) =

2008 novel by Mansour Bushnaf

- First edition
- Author: Mansour Bushnaf
- Original title: سراب الليل.. العلكة
- Translator: Mona Zaki
- Cover artist: Luke Pajak
- Language: English
- Genre: Fiction
- Publisher: DARF Publishers
- Publication date: 1 June 2014
- Publication place: United Kingdom
- Media type: Print and Electronic (Paperback & ebook)
- Pages: 125 pp
- ISBN: 978-1-85077-272-9

Chewing Gum is the debut novel of Libyan writer Mansour Bushnaf, first published in Arabic 2008 in Cairo. It was banned by the Gaddafi regime in Libya. It was first published in English in 2014 by DARF Publishers with a translation by Mona Zaki.

== Plot summary ==
The novel centres around Mukhtar, whose father, Omar Efendi, was in the Royal Police Force, and his mother, Rahma, was from a Turco-Libyan family; Mukhtar stands frozen for ten years like a statue in the middle of public park in Libyan capital Tripoli after he was abandoned by his lover, the young and promiscuous Fatma. While the country is gripped with a chewing gum craze, different Libyan professors that just came from their studies abroad try to rediscover the country and suggest different theories to explain a society gripped with chewing gum and consumerism.

== Characters ==
- Mukhtar - The Hero
- Fatma - The Heroine
- Omar Effendi - Mukhtar's Father
- Ghouiliya - A Prostitute
- Rahma - MuKhtar's Mother
- Uthman - Rahma's Friend

== Reviews ==
- Winstonsdad's Review of Mansour Bushanf's Chewing Gum, Winstonsdad's Blog, May 19, 2014
- Bookshy Review of Mansour Bushnaf's Chewing Gum, Bookshy An African Book Lover blog, July 3, 2014
- Nahla Ink Review of Mansour Bushnaf's Chewing Gum, Nahla Ink Blog, July 15, 2014
- Ramblings of an Elfpire Review of Chewing Gum By Mansour Bushnaf, Ramblings of an Elfpire, September 30, 2014
- By the Book Reviews on Chewing Gum by Mansour Bushnaf, By the Book Reviews, November 1, 2014
