= Maryam Salama =

Libyan writer and poet (born 1965)

Maryam Ahmed Salama (born 1965) is a Libyan writer and poet, called by one reviewer "a leading light in the new generation of female Libyan writers." Her works are based on the position of women in contemporary Libyan society.

== Career ==
Maryam Ahmed Salama was born in Tripoli, received her undergraduate degree from the Department of Literature and Culture at al-Fateh University in 1987.

Maryam Salama works currently in the field of translation with an emphasis on historical studies. Her works of prose and poetry have been published in Libyan and foreign newspapers and magazines, especially after a loosening of censorship laws in Libya in the 1990s. She currently works at the Old City Project in Tripoli, as a translator. In 2012 she participated in the Tripoli International Poetry Festival, organized by fellow Libyan poets Ashur Etwebi and Khaled Mattawa, the first such event in Libya since the fall of Muammar Gaddafi. Her works have been published in Libyan and Arab magazines as well as newspapers. Her works are based on position of women in contemporary Libyan society. She has included the theme in all her fiction and short stories.

== List of works ==
- Dreams of an Imprisoned Child (Ahlam tifla sajina) (poetry, 1992)
- Nothing but the Dream (La shay'siwa al bulm) (poetry, 1992)
- "From Door to Door" (Min Bab ila Bab), a short story.
