= Ahmed Fagih =

Libyan novelist (1942–2019)

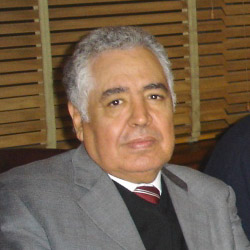
- Ahmed Fagih
- Born: 28 December 1942; Mizda, Libya
- Died: 30 April 2019 (aged 76); Cairo, Egypt
- Occupations: Novelist, playwright, essayist, diplomat
- Writing career
- Notable works: Garden of The Night Trilogy, Maps of the Soul

Ahmed Ibrahim al-Fagih (Arabic: أحمد إبراهيم الفقيه ’áħmad 'Ibrāhīm al-faqīh) (December 28, 1942 – April 30, 2019) was a Libyan novelist, playwright, essayist, journalist and diplomat. He began writing short stories at an early age publishing them in Libyan newspapers and magazines. He gained recognition in 1965 when his first collection of short stories There Is No Water in the Sea (Arabic: البحر لا ماء فيه) won him the highest award sponsored by the Royal Commission of Fine Arts in Libya. Fagih wrote many more books in different genres, including short stories, novels, plays, essays, among them Gazelles (play), Evening Visitor (play), Gardens of the Night Trilogy (novels), The Valley of Ashes (novel), and his 12-volume epic novel Maps of the Soul, which had its first three volumes translated into English and published by DARF Publishers in UK in 2014.

Fagih held several diplomatic posts representing Libya, in London, Athens, Bucharest and Cairo. He lived and worked between Cairo and Tripoli.

== Biography ==
Ahmed Fagih was born in 1942 in Mizda, a small oasis town south of Tripoli, where he entered school and studied until his teens before he migrated to Tripoli in 1957 to pursue higher studies and begin his writing career. Fagih travelled in 1962 to Egypt to study journalism with the help of a UNESCO sponsorship program, returning later to Tripoli to work as a journalist. In 1965 he published his first collection of short stories titled There Is No Water in the Sea (Arabic: البحر لا ماء فيه), which won him the highest award sponsored by the Royal Commission of Fine Arts in Libya. In the late 1960s he travelled to London to study drama and theatre until 1972. After returning from Britain he was appointed the director of the National Institute of Music and Drama. In 1972 Fagih became the editor of the influential cultural and literary newspaper The Cultural Weekly (Arabic: الاسبوع الثقافي al-Usbūʻ al-thaqāfi), which featured many new Libyan writers. During this period he founded The New Theatre play and drama group through which he directed/performed in several plays.

Fagih became the head of the Department of Arts and Literature at the Libyan Ministry of Information and Culture and in 1978 was one of the founders of the Union of Libyan Writers and was elected as its first Secretary General, later travelling back to London to take a diplomatic position as the press counsellor at the Libyan Embassy in Britain, during which he established the Arab Cultural Trust, which launched a cultural quarterly magazine named Azure becoming its editor-in-chief.

In 1983 he was awarded a Doctorate of Philosophy PhD from the Faculty of Arts of The University of Edinburgh submitting a thesis on 'The Libyan short story'. He published his three part novel Garden of The Night in 1991, which won the best creative work of Beirut Book Fair. In 2000 he edited an English anthology of 13 short stories by Libyan writers.

== Works ==
=== Short stories ===
- There Is No Water in the Sea (1965) البحر لا ماء فيه
- Fasten Your Seatbelts اربطوا أحزمة المقاعد
- The Stars Vanished So Where Are You? أختفت النجوم فأين أنت؟
- A Woman of Light إمرأة من ضوء
- Five Beetles Trying the Tree خمس خنافس تحاكم الشجرة
- Mirrors of Venice مرايا فينسيا
- 30 Short Stories ثلاثون قصة قصيرة

=== Novels ===
- Homeless Rats فئران بلا جحور
- Valley of Ashes حقول الرماد
- Shall Present You With Another City سأهبك مدينة أخرى
- These Are The Borders of My Kingdom هذه تخوم مملكتي
- A Tunnel Lit by A Woman نفق تضيئه أمرأة واحدة
- The Trilogy (Garden of The Night) الثلاثية الروائية
- Maps of The Soul, an epic work of fiction in 12 volumes خرائط الروح

=== Plays ===
- Gazelles الغزالات

== Theatre Productions ==
- Gazelles, adapted and directed by Adrian Mitchell, Shaw Theatre, London (UK), 1982
- Le Gazzelle, directed by Marco Di Stefano, Piccolo Teatro di Milano, Milan, (Italy), 2010

== See also ==
- Libyan literature
