= Ali Yusuf Zikri =

Libyan politician and engineer

Ali Yusuf Zikri (Arabic: علي يوسف زكري) is a Libyan politician and engineer who served in the Libyan government as Secretary of the General People's Committee of Libya (al-lajna ash-sha'bēya al-'āmma) for Industry and Mines. He received this appointment in January 2007 and replaced former Minister of Industry & Mines, Ali Umar al-Hasnawi. He was formerly acting as GPCO Secretary for Telecommunication and Transport.
