= Misrata District =

District of Libya

Coordinates: 31°30′N 14°30′E

Misrata مصراته
- District
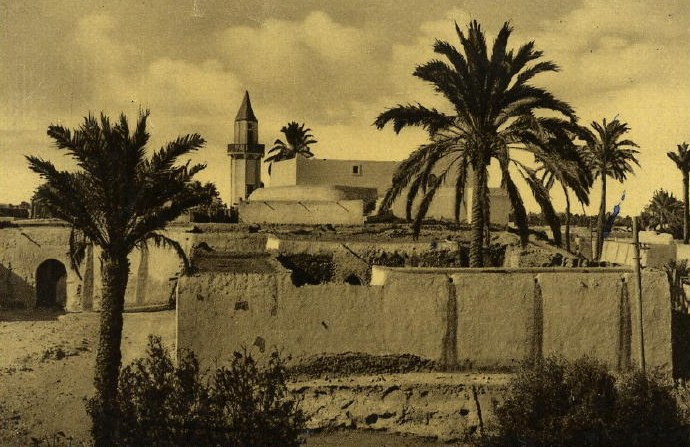

- Map of Libya with Misurata district highlighted
- Country: Libya
- Capital: Misrata

Population (2006)
  - Total: 550,938
- License Plate Code: 3, 28

Misrata or Misratah (Arabic: مصراته, romanized: Miṣrāta, Libyan Arabic: Məṣrāta), also known by the Italian spelling Misurata, is a sha'biyah (district) in northwestern Libya. Its capital is the city of Misrata. In 2007 the district was enlarged to include what had been the Bani Walid District and the northernmost strip of coast of the Gulf of Sidra, that from 2001 to 2007 had been part of Sirte District. In the north and east, Misrata has a shoreline on the Mediterranean Sea. On land, it borders Sirte in south and east, Murqub in north and west and Jabal al Gharbi in south and west.

Per the census of 2012, the total population in the region was 157,747 with 150,353 Libyans. The average size of the household of Libyans was 6.9, and for non-Libyans it was 3.7. There were a total of 22,713 households in the district, 20,907 being Libyan ones. The population density of the district was 1.86 persons per km^{2}. Per the 2006 census, there were totally 148,352 economically active people in the district.

== Geography ==
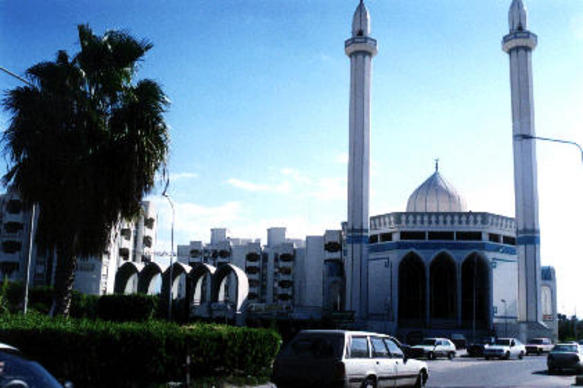
Misurata main Mosque

Libya has mostly a flat undulating plain and occasional plateau, with an average elevation of around 423 m (1,388 ft). Around 91 per cent of the land is covered by desert, with only 8.8 per cent agricultural land (with only 1% arable lands) and 0.1 per cent of forests. The major resources are petroleum, gypsum and natural gas. Along the coastal regions, the climate is Mediterranean in coastal areas, while it is desert climate in all other parts. Dust storms lasting four to eight days is pretty common during Spring. Tripolitania is the northwest region, while it is Cyrenacia in the east and Fezzen in southwest. Tripolitania runs from north to south and has set of coastal oases, plains and limestone plateaus having an elevation of 2,000 ft (610 m) to 3,000 ft (910 m). The region receives an annual rainfall of 16 in (410 mm). There are no perennial rivers in the region, but the region is abundant with groundwater aquifers. Most of the major cities of Libya are located in the coastal regions.

== Demographics ==
According to the 1936 census, which allowed citizens to declare their ethnicity, Misrata's native population was made up of 70.1% Arabs, 13.4% Berbers, 11.6% Turks, 3.4% Black people and 1.5% Others. Per the census of 2012, the total population in the region was 157,747 with 150,353 Libyans. The average size of the household in the country was 6.9, while the average household size of non-Libyans being 3.7. There were totally 22,713 households in the district, with 20,907 Libyan ones. The population density of the district was 1.86 persons per km^{2}. Per 2006 census, there were totally 148,352 economically active people in the district. There were 57,904 government employees, 17,387 employers, 73,053 first level workers and 259 second level workers. There were 21,444 workers in state administration, 11,309 in agriculture, animal husbandry and forestry, 12,455 in agriculture & hunting, 30,819 in education, 20,976 in private enterprises, 4,514 in health & social work, 15,978 in production, 33,497 in technical work and 1,950 service workers. The total enrollment in schools was 186,168 and the number of people above secondary stage and less than graduation was 6,697. As per the report from World Health Organization (WHO), there were two communicable disease centres, 25 dental clinics, three general clinics, nine in-patient clinics, 27 out-patient clinics, 81 pharmacies, 68 PHC centres, four polyclinics, one rural clinic and two specialized clinics. Islam is the state and major religion of the country.

== Local administration ==
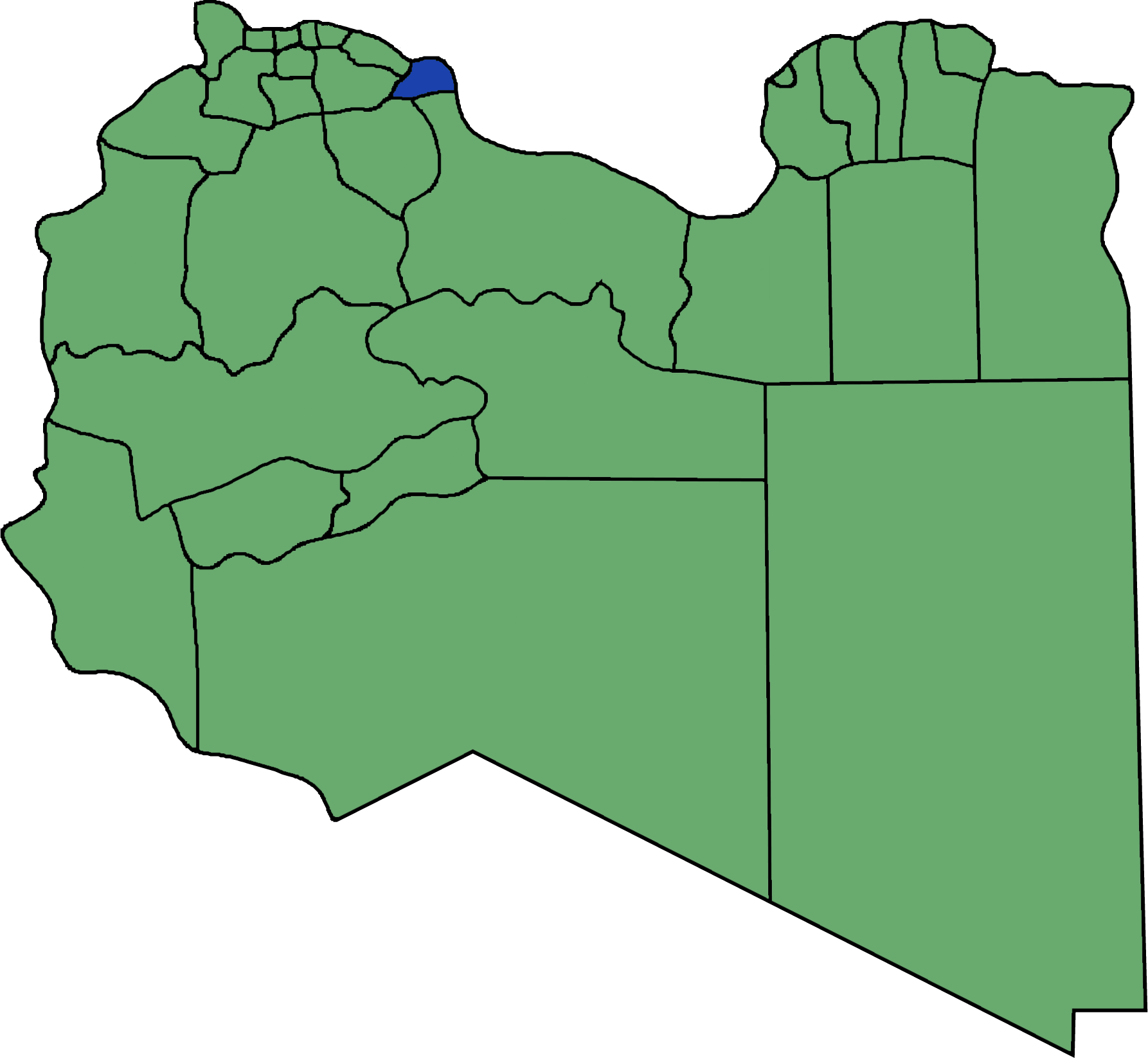
Pre-2007 extent of Misrata District

Libya became independent in 1951 from the colonial empire and generally known for its oil rich resources. All the powers rested centrally with the president, Gaddafi, for 42 years till the 2011 armed rebellion which topple him. As per the constitution, Libya is the most decentralized Arab nation, but practically all powers are vested on central government on account of control over the oil revenues. Local governmental institutions manage the administration of education, industry, and communities. As a part of decentralization in 2012, the country is administratively split into 13 regions from the original 25 municipalities, which were further divided in 1,500 communes. Since 2015, the chief of the state is a chairman of Presidential Council, while the prime minister is the head of the state. The House of Representatives is an elected body that is elected on universal suffrage and popular vote. As of 2016, there were 22 administrative divisions in the country in the form of districts.

== See also ==
- Index: Populated places in Misrata District
