= Zanonia (disambiguation) =

Zanonia is a genus of tropical creeper.

Zanonia may also refer to:

- Zanonia indica, the sole member of the Zanonia genus.
- Zanonia macrocarpa, obsolete classification of the Alsomitra macrocarpa tropical creeper having wing-shaped seeds
- Zanonia, a genus of wasps in the family Pteromalidae; synonym of Colotrechnus
- Ross RS-1 Zanonia sailplane.
