= Etrich Flugzeugwerke =

Etrich Flugzeugwerke (EFW) was a short-lived aircraft manufacturer founded by Igo Etrich.

The company became part of Brandenburgische Flugzeugwerke in 1914, which then, in turn, became part of Hansa-Brandenburg.

Some of the planes were manufactured in Trautenau (today Trutnov, Czech Republic) and others in Liebau (today Lubawka, Poland).

== Aircraft produced ==
- Etrich Taube 1910
- Etrich VII 1911
- Luft-Limousine 1912
- Sport-Taube 1929

== See also ==
- Volksflugzeug
