= C. macrocarpa =

C. macrocarpa may refer to:

- Carissa macrocarpa, the Natal plum, a shrub native to South Africa
- Clinosperma macrocarpa, a palm tree species found in New Caledonia
- Cupressus macrocarpa, the Monterey cypress, a tree species, known simply as macrocarpa in Australia and New Zealand

== See also ==
- Macrocarpa (disambiguation)
