= Lester F. Bishop =

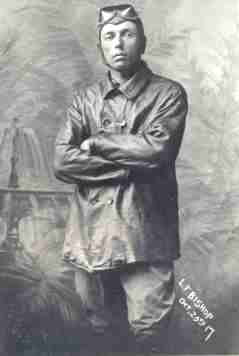
Lester Frank Bishop on October 20, 1917

Lester Frank Bishop (April 12, 1889 – March 28, 1967) was an American pioneer aviator who delivered air mail.

He was born in Chicago, Illinois. He made his first flight in a Rumpler Taube on August 4, 1916. In 1922 he filed for divorce. He died in San Diego, California.

== History ==
Lester F. Bishop was started in the Air Mail Service from December 27, 1918, until September 16, 1919. He took a break but was back as a pilot on November 30, 1919. However, his work at Air Mail Service ended again on June 30, 1927. During his time as a pilot, he flew for a total of 2176.37 hours, covering a distance of 210,535 miles.

Assignment
Time	Location
before January 7, 1919	Cleveland, Ohio
January 7, 1919	Belmont Park, New York
February 6, 1919	Bustleton Field, Pennsylvania
March 27, 1919	Belmont Park, New York
April 15, 1919	Cleveland, Ohio
September 16, 1920	Cleveland, Ohio
July 1, 1921	Hazelhurst Field, New York
February 1, 1922	Cleveland, Ohio
June 16, 1922	Salt Lake City, Utah
September 1, 1926	Iowa City, Iowa
