= Giulio Gavotti =

Italian pilot (1882–1939)

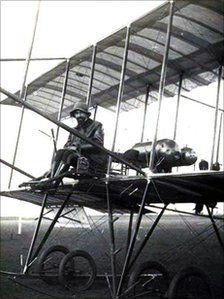
Giulio Gavotti on a Farman biplane in Rome (1910)

Giulio Gavotti (17 October 1882 in Genoa – 6 October 1939) was an Italian lieutenant and pilot who fought in the Italo-Turkish War where he dropped the world's first aerial bomb from his Taube monoplane over the Ain Zara oasis in Libya.

== Aerial bombardment ==
On 1 November 1911, he flew his early model Etrich Taube monoplane against the Ottoman military in Libya. He took four grenades ("Cipelli") in a leather pouch, each of a size of grapefruit and weighing about four pounds. Flying at an altitude of 600 feet, Gavotti screwed in the detonators and tossed each munition over the side—three onto the Tajura oasis and one more onto a military camp at Ain Zara. This event is the first recorded airstrike launched from an airplane.

After this and further missions, the Ottoman Empire issued a protest. The dropping of bombs from balloons had been outlawed by the Hague Convention of 1899, but Italy argued that this ban did not extend to heavier-than-air craft.

The oldest known preserved Etrich Taube, in Vienna Technical Museum, is possibly a near-twin to the aircraft Gavotti flew in 1911, as both are said to have been powered with inline four-cylinder liquid-cooled powerplants.

== Night mission ==
Gavotti performed the historically first night mission of a heavier-than-air aircraft. It took place as part of the same campaign in Libya on 4 March 1912.

== See also ==
- 1911 in aviation
- Aerial bomb
- Bomber
- Tactical bombing
