= Etrich VII =

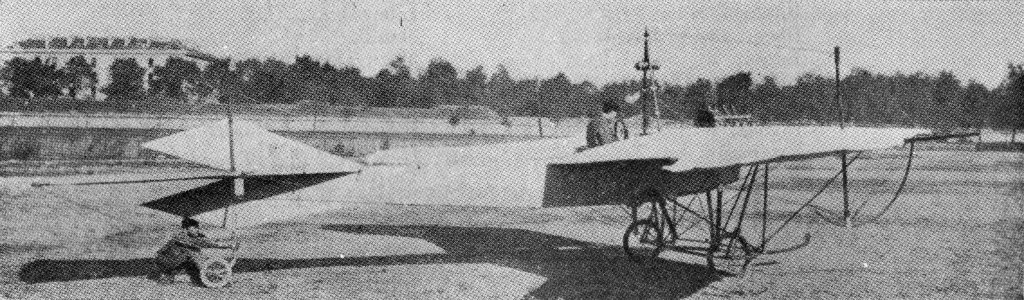
- Etrich VII

General information
- Type: Monoplane
- National origin: Austria-Hungary
- Manufacturer: Etrich
- Designer: Igo Etrich
- Primary user: Austria-Hungary, Germany, Italy, Russia
- Number built: 5 (1912)

The Etrich VII monoplane was designed by Igo Etrich and first flown in 1911. A closely related two-seat design known as the Etrich VIII was also produced around the same time. Examples of VII and VIII were sold to several European militaries, including those of Russia, Germany, Austria-Hungary and Italy.

== Specifications (VII) ==
General characteristics

- Crew: 1
- Length: 11.3 m (37 ft 1 in)
- Wingspan: 14.6 m (47 ft 11 in)
- Wing area: 35 m^{2} (380 sq ft)
- Powerplant: 1 × Austro-Daimler 6 "V", 89 kW (120 hp)

== Operators ==
- Austria-Hungary

- Austro-Hungarian Imperial and Royal Aviation Troops

- German Empire

- Imperial German Flying Corps

- Kingdom of Italy

- Royal Italian Army

- Russian Empire

- Imperial Russian Air Service
