= Macrocarpa (disambiguation) =

Macrocarpa, large-fruited in Latin, may refer to:

- Alsomitra macrocarpa, a tropical climber with wing-like seeds.
- Crataegus × macrocarpa, a hybrid between two species of hawthorn
- Eucalyptus macrocarpa, commonly known as mottlecah, a species of mallee endemic to Australia
- Macrocarpa – the common New Zealand and Australian name for the Monterey cypress (Cupressus macrocarpa)
- Macrozanonia macrocarpa, an obsolete classification of Alsomitra macrocarpa.
- Zanonia macrocarpa, an obsolete classification of Alsomitra macrocarpa.
