= Ain Zara =

Ain Zara عين زارة
- Town
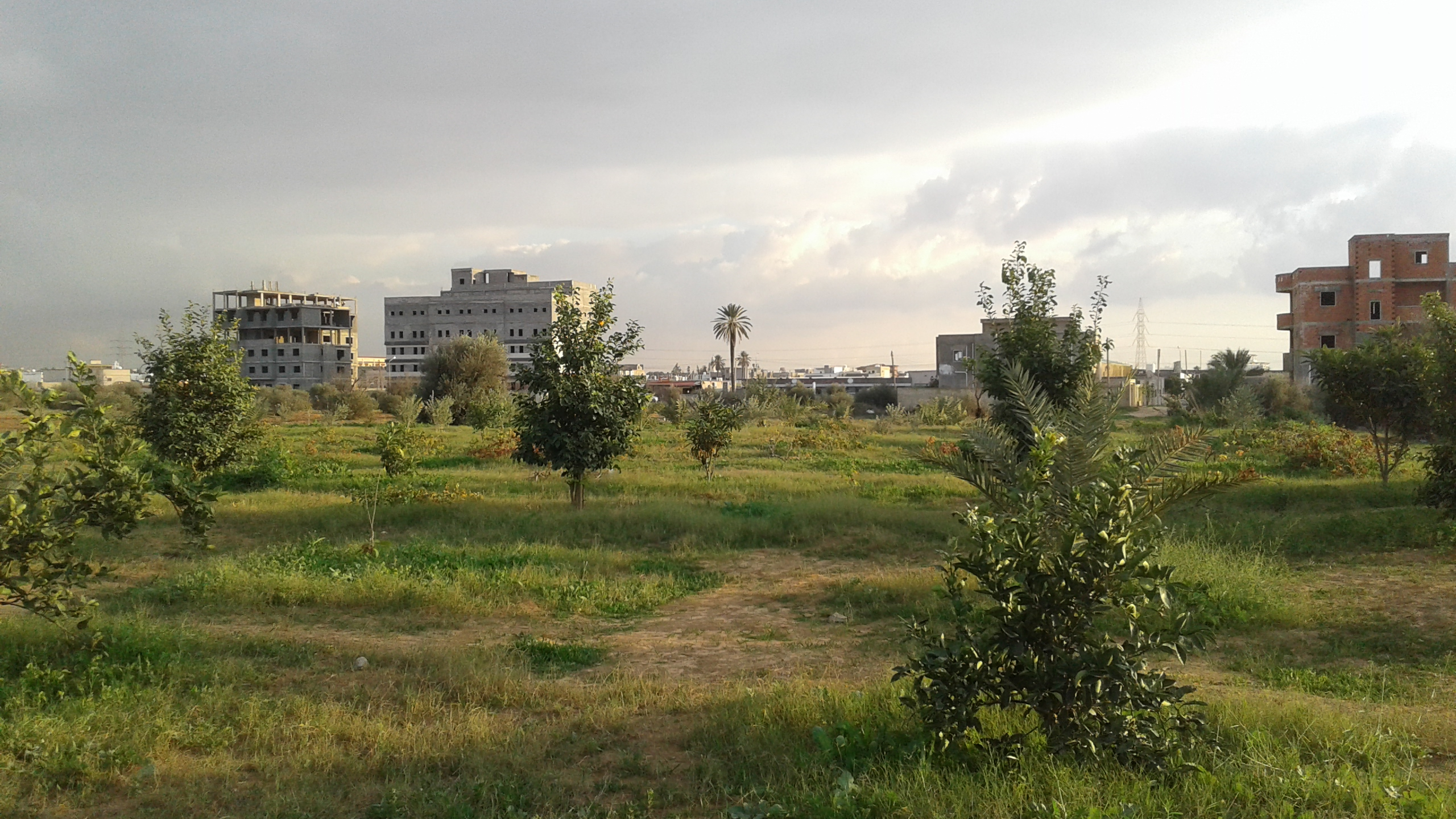
- A farm in Ain Zara

- Location in Libya
- Coordinates: 32°48′48″N 13°16′11″E
- Country: Libya
- District: Tripoli
- Municipality: Ain Zara
- Elevation: 118 ft (36 m)

Population
  - Religions: Sunni Islam; Christianity (historical)
- Time zone: UTC+2

Ain Zara is a town and oasis in western Libya, located in the region of Tripoli.

== History ==
In ancient times it was an important agricultural center. Located in the surroundings of Ain Zara are the remnants of a fourth-century Christian necropolis.

During the Italo-Turkish War, Ain Zara witnessed the first known use of airplanes in war, with Italian Army Air Corps Blériot XI and Nieuport IV monoplanes bombing the Ottoman camp at Ain Zara.

In the aftermath, Ain Zara was occupied by Italian troops on December 4, 1911 after heavy fighting with Ottoman forces. After capturing Ain Zara, Italian forces fortified the area and built a new railway section that linked Ain Zara to Tripoli.

In later history, during the Second Libyan Civil War, about 400 prisoners escaped from a prison in the town on September 2, 2018 amid fighting between rival militias for control of the area.

== See also ==
- Battle of Ain Zara
