= Guglielmo Pecori Giraldi =

Italian noble, general and politician

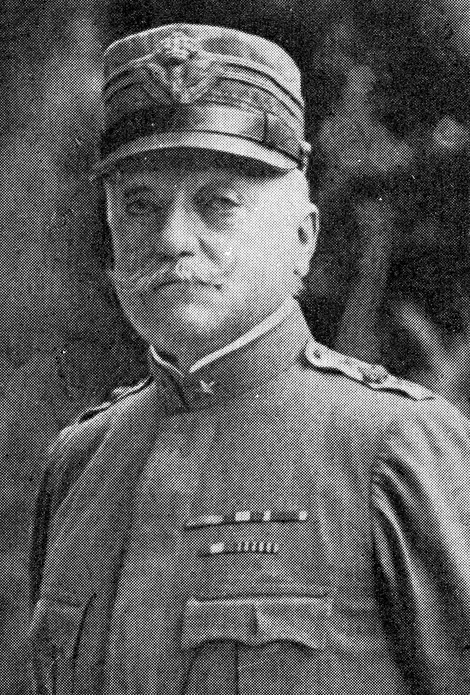
- Born: 18 May 1856 Borgo San Lorenzo
- Died: 15 January 1941 (aged 84) Florence
- Allegiance: Kingdom of Italy (1877–1912 and 1915–1919)
- Branch: Royal Italian Army
- Rank: Marshal of Italy
- Conflicts: First Italo-Ethiopian War (1887–1889); Italo-Turkish War (1911–1912); First World War (1915–1918); Second Battle of the Isonzo (1915); Trentino Offensive (late spring 1916)

Guglielmo Pecori Giraldi, OSSA, OSML, OMS, OCI (18 May 1856 – 15 January 1941) was an Italian noble, general and politician, mostly known for commanding the Italian 1st Army during World War I.

== Early life ==
Born in Borgo San Lorenzo, at the time in the Grand Duchy of Tuscany, he was the son of Francesco Pecori Giraldi, Imperial Count and Florentine Patrician, titles which he would later inherit, and his wife Maria Genta. His father had an active role in the Risorgimento, fought in the battle of Curtatone in 1848, and later become the first mayor of Borgo San Lorenzo of the newly founded Kingdom of Italy, in 1861. Guglielmo was the elder of three sons and a daughter: Alessandro, the only one who left male issues, Galeazzo, Gisella and Alfredo. Though he married twice, he died without issues, and the titles passed to his brother's heirs.

== Military career ==
He attended the Italian Military Academy of Turin, becoming sub-lieutenant of Artillery in 1877, and was assigned to the 11th Artillery Regiment. In 1879 reached the rank of lieutenant, and moved to the 2nd Art. Regiment, where he served as adjutant-major. In 1884 was promoted captain and assigned to the Staff of Artillery Corps.

=== Colonial service ===
In February 1887, was transferred to the General Staff of the Army, and assigned to the African Special Corps of General Alessandro Asinari di San Marzano in Eritrea. In December 1891, he was promoted major of Infantry, and reassigned to the General Staff. In 1895, he returned in Africa, serving as a staff officer in the First Italo-Ethiopian War. While in the Eritrean colony he was promoted twice to the rank of Infantry Colonel.

In 1900, he was appointed Chief of Staff of the VII Army Corps, and three years later was again sent in Africa as commander of the Regio Corpo Truppe Coloniali (RCTC Royal Corps of Colonial Troops). Promoted Major General, from 1907, he commanded the Infantry brigades "Pisa" and "Cuneo". On the eve of the Libyan War he was promoted Lieutenant General and took command of the 1st Military Division in Messina.

=== The Italo-Turkish War ===
After the outbreak of the Italo-Turkish War, the Kingdom of Italy sent in Libya an army corps, 34,000 men under the command of the seasoned general Carlo Caneva. The corps itself was formed by two divisions: Pecori Giraldi was appointed commander of one of them. During the fights for Tripoli, he led the right column in the successful Italian attack to Ain Zara, and in December 1911, was put in command of the conquered oasis' defenses. Wrongly informed about a group of local leaders who favored the Italians were being held captive in the nearby post of Bir Tobraz, he ordered colonel Gustavo Fara a sortie. The Italian column was trapped by Turks and local troops. Though he tried to blame Fara for this failure, he was questioned by a military commission and eventually relieved of command. He retired – or, as rumors said, forced to retire – at the end of the war. Although later cleared of all accusations, he was only listed among the Reserve officers.

=== The First World War ===
In the spring of 1915 when Italy declared war on Austria-Hungary, he was recalled for duty and commanded first a division and later the VII Army Corps at the lower Isonzo river. On 8 May 1916, he assumed command of the Italian First Army to stop the Austrian-Hungarian Trentino Offensive. On 3 November 1918, in the wake of the Battle of Vittorio Veneto, he marched into Trento and occupied the city. He remained civil and military governor of Trentino-Alto Adige until December 1919.

== Later life ==
In late 1919, he was named senator by the King Victor Emmanuel III.

In 1926, he was promoted by the fascist regime to the rank of Marshal of Italy, and to senator for life in 1929. He died in 1941, in Florence, of pneumonia.

== Legacy ==
The street Lungarno Pecori Giraldi in Florence was named after him.

== Decorations and awards ==
- Supreme Order of the Most Holy Annunciation – (1929)
- Knight Grand Cross of the Order of Saints Maurice and Lazarus
- Knight Grand Cross of the Military Order of Savoy – (1919)
- Knight Grand Cross of the Order of the Crown of Italy
- War Merit Cross (Italy) (two times)
- Commemorative Medal for the Italo-Turkish War 1911-1912
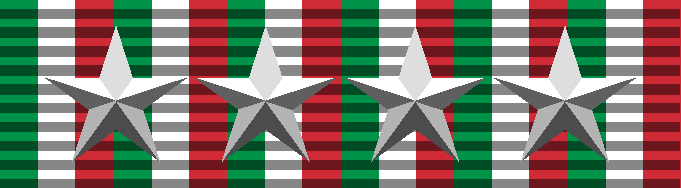
- Commemorative Medal for the Italo-Austrian War 1915-1918 (four years of campaign)
- Allied Victory Medal (Italy)
