= Italian Libya Railways =

Railways in Italian Libya between the world wars

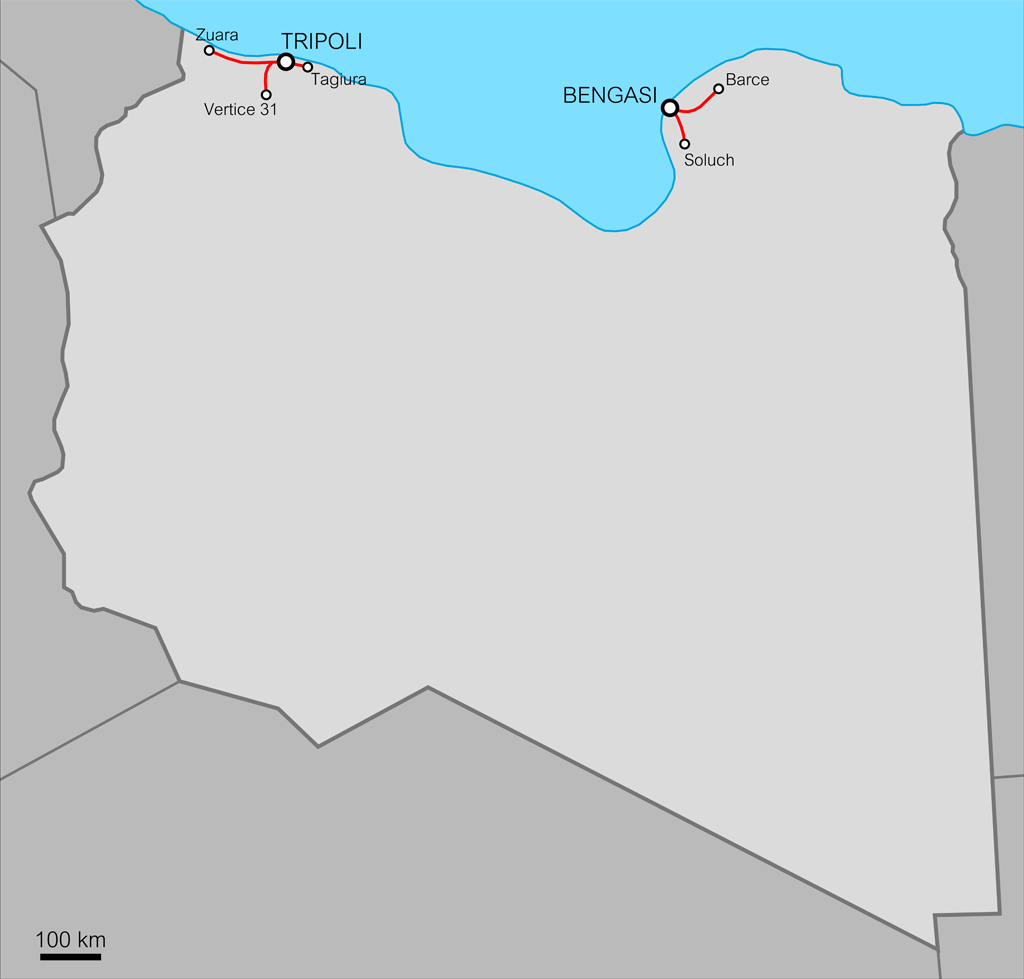
The five railways in Italian Libya.

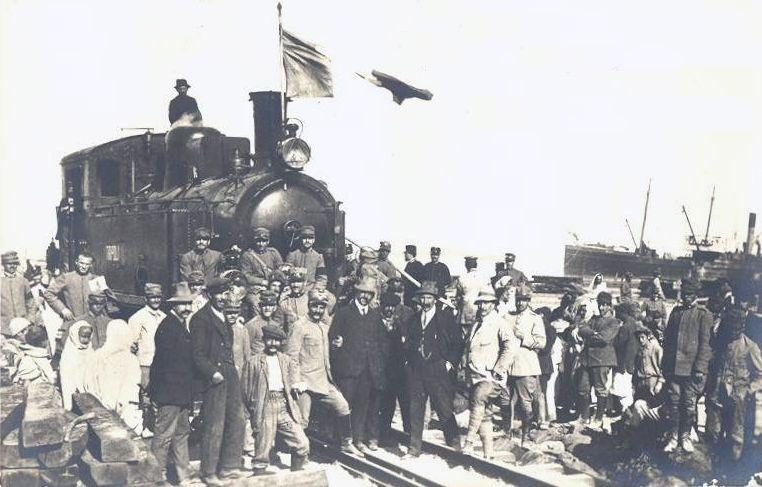
The first Italian Locomotive arrived in the Tripoli port

Italian Libya Railways was a group of railways built in the Italian colony of Libya between the two World Wars.

== History ==
The Kingdom of Italy built in Italian Libya nearly 400 km of railways with 950 mm (3 ft 1 3/8 in) gauge.

== Projects ==
The Italian authorities decided to give priority to the construction of roads in Libya when Benito Mussolini took control of the Italian colonies. After 1926 no more railways were made in Libya, but during World War II the need of railways transport to the front during the war in the frontier with British Egypt changed this approach.

In spring 1941 the Italian government started the construction of a new railway between Tripoli and Benghazi, but by the end of 1942 all was stopped because of the Italian defeat in north Africa: only 18 km were done in Cirenaica. In the same period was started the enlargement of the "Tripoli-Zuara" until the border with Tunisia (and also these works was blocked by the Italian defeat at El Alamein in November 1942).

Additionally it is noteworthy to pinpoint that an international project was studied for decades, but never done because of excessive financial difficulties:

- Italian "Transaharan railway" (Tripoli-Tchad/Camerun) between Libia and the Gulf of Guinea

== Equipment ==
In Libya the first locomotives were the steam locomotives R.401 and R.301, but the most successful were the R.302 produced in northern Italy.

== Railways ==
There were only five small railways:

1) Tripoli-Zuara (118 km):

Stations	Central: Tripoli	5 km: Gurgi	6 km: Gargaresc	16 km: Janzur	22 km: Saliad	30 km: Lemaia	35 km: EtTuebiaGarg	47 km: EzZauia	56 km: EsSabriaBu-Isa	64 km: Sorman	76 km: SabrathaVulpia	82 km: ZungaelAgelat	100 km: Mellita	118 km: Zuara

2) Bengazi-Barce (108 km):

Stations	Central: Bengazi	9 km: Lete	19 km: Benina	30 km: Regima	41 km: GabreGira	49 km: BuMariam	60 km: el-Abiar	76 km: SidiMaius	86 km: Sferi	91 km: Sleaia	97 km: SidiGibrin	108 km: Barce

3) Tripoli-Garian (90 km):

Stations	Central: Tripoli	5 km: Gurgi	6 km: Gargaresc	19 km: ElMisciasta	24 km: EnNgila	29 km: SuaniBenAdem	35 km: BirElMiamin	43 km: UmmelAdem	50 km: ElAzizia	83 km: HenscirElAbiat	90 km: Vertice31

4) Bengasi-Soluch (56 km):

Stations	Central: Bengazi	1 km: Bengasi Porto	2 km: Berca	10 km: Guarscia	14 km: GuarsciaBen	24 km: Nauaghia	32 km: NauaghiaB	40 km: Giardina	45 km: GiardinaVS	50 km: SoluchFV	56 km: Soluch

5) Tripoli-Tagiura (21 km):

Stations	Central: Tripoli	2 km: Tripoli Riccardo	3 km: Cavalleria	5 km: SidiMessri	9 km: Fornaci	11 km: AinZara	13 km: Sghedeida	15 km: ElMellaha	20 km: TagiuraFV	21 km: Tagiura VS

== Gallery ==
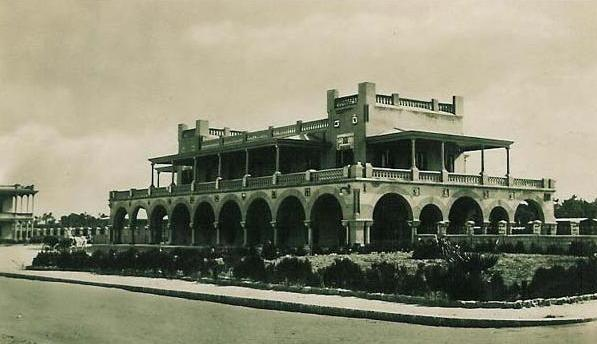
Tripoli Railway Station in 1940

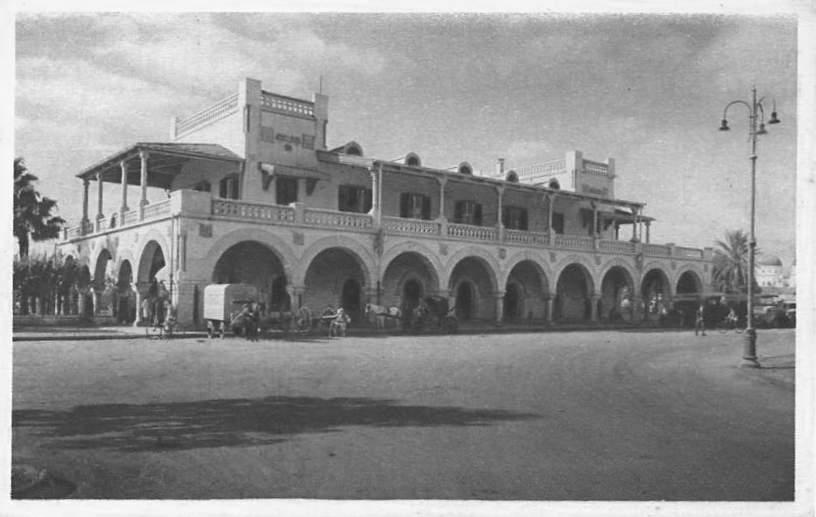
Benghazi Railway Station in 1930

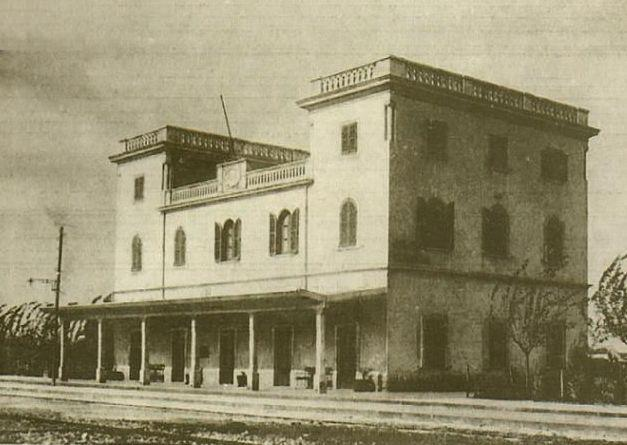
Barce Railway station in 1930

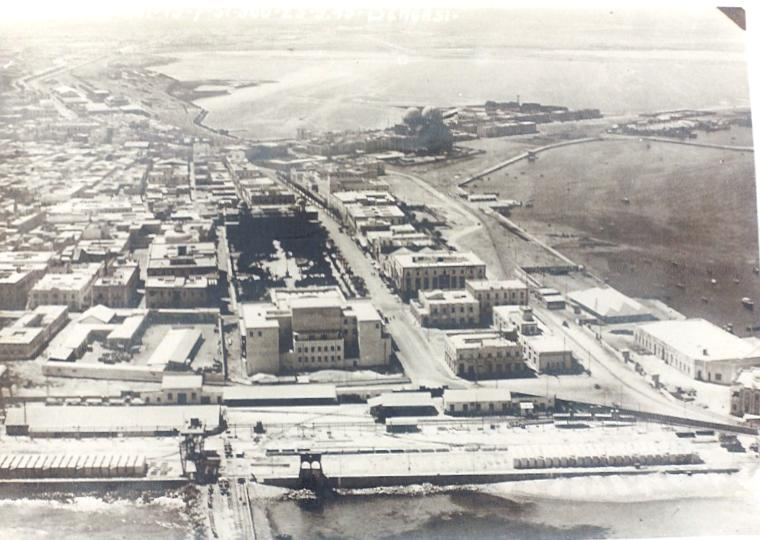
Italian Benghazi with port railways

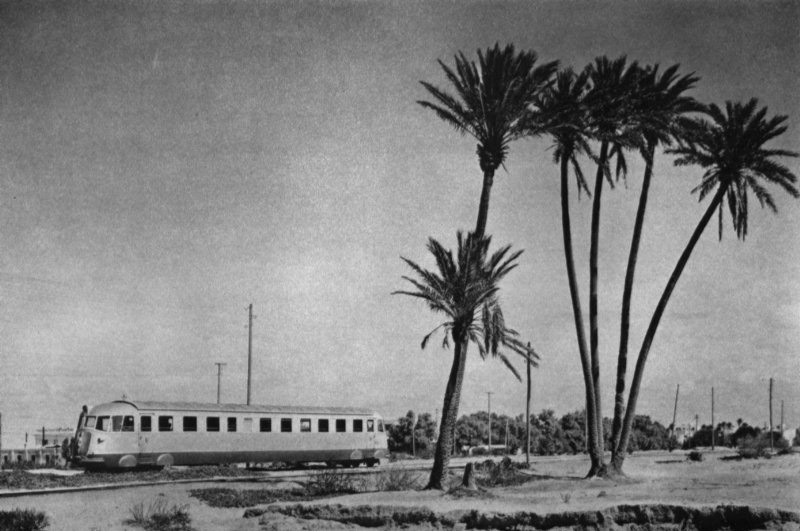
Fiat "Littorina" passing in Cirenaica

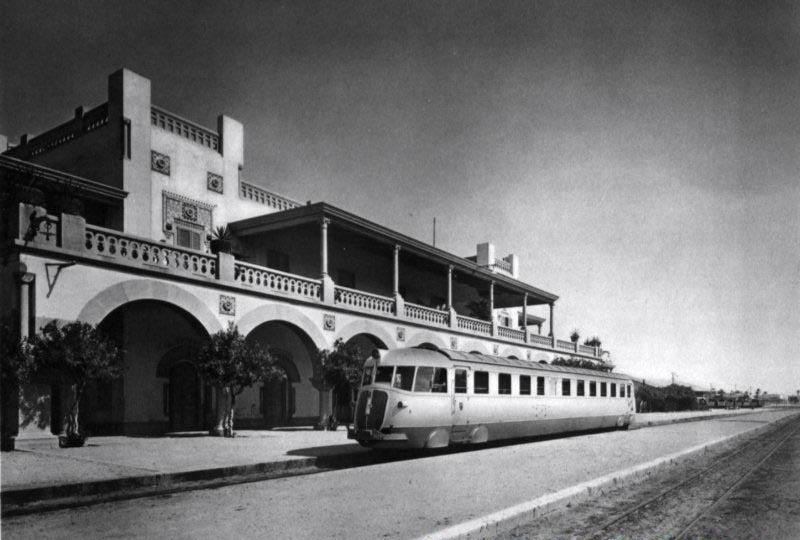
Fiat train at Tripoli Station

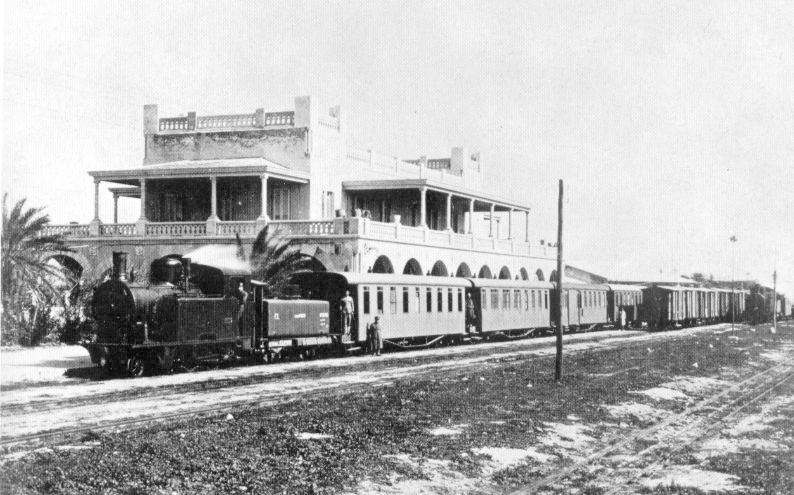
Old steam train at Tripoli Station in 1920

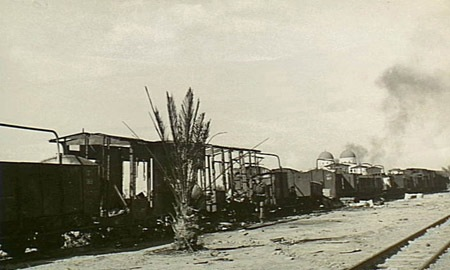
Destruction of Benghazi station in 1943

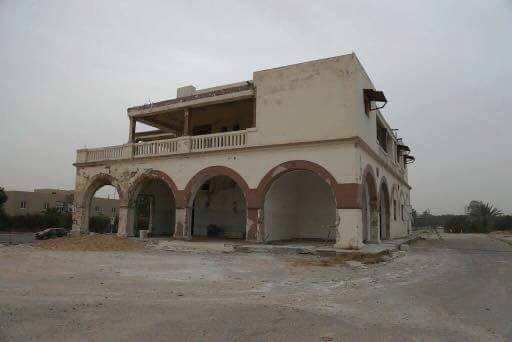
Janzour Railway Station in 2016

== See also ==
- Railway stations in Libya
- History of Libya as Italian colony
- Italian colonial railways
- Italian Libya
- Eritrean Railway
