= Etrich Sport-Taube =

Sport-Taube
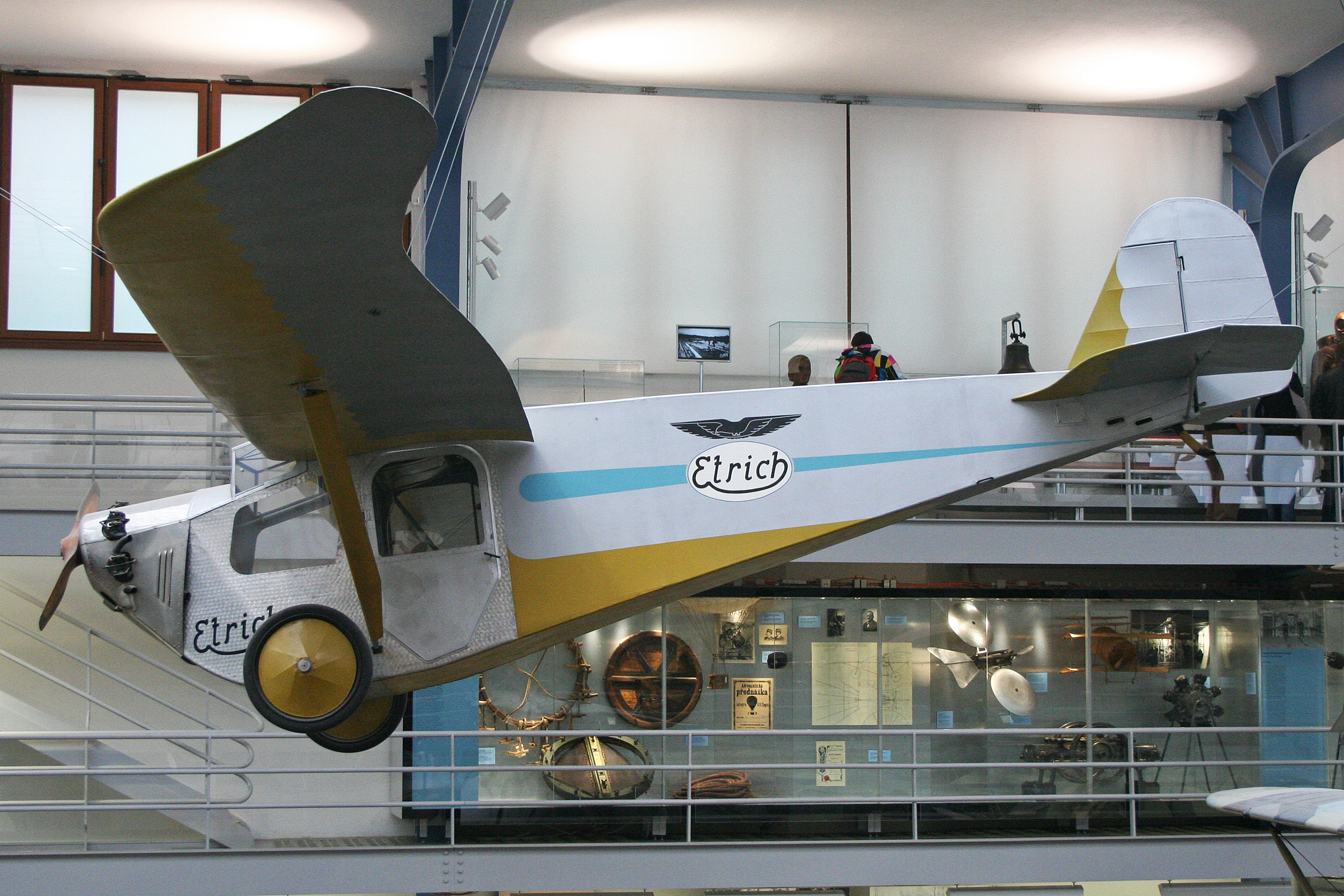
- The Etrich Sport-Taube at the National Technical Museum (Prague).

General information
- Type: One seat sports aircraft
- National origin: Czechoslovakia
- Manufacturer: Etrich
- Designer: Igo Etrich
- Number built: 1

History
- First flight: 1929

The Etrich Sport-Taube was a one-off, single engine, one seat monoplane, built in Czechoslovakia in 1929.

== Design and development ==
The Sport-Taube was a plane built and designed by Igo Etrich, the famous builder of the Etrich Taube. It was originally intended as a Volksflugzeug, a low-cost airplane. However, it faced difficulties regarding production in series and the project was given up.

After World War I, Etrich moved to Trautenau, now Trutnov, in the newly founded Czechoslovakia. He built the Sport-Taube, a closed-cockpit monoplane, in the same factory where he built textile machinery. The original plane is now displayed suspended from the roof at the National Technical Museum in Prague, Czech Republic.

The Sport-Taube was powered by a 40 hp (30 kW) engine.

== Operational history ==
Although the Sport-Taube was intended to be commercialized as a private aircraft, with its 40 hp (30 kW) engine it was deemed to be faster than the planes of the Czechoslovak Air Force at that time. Thus the Czech authorities made difficulties to the Etrich company to obtain the permits that were necessary for mass production of the plane, claiming that the plane could be used for smuggling. Disappointed, Igo Etrich abandoned his aeronautical projects and dedicated himself fully to the production of textile machinery.

== Specifications ==
Data from Monografie: Etrich E.VIII 1929/1930 Taube Limousine

General characteristics

- Crew: One
- Capacity: One passenger
- Length: 6.67 m (21 ft 11 in)
- Wingspan: 11.00 m (36 ft 1 in)
- Height: 2.55 m (8 ft 4 in)
- Wing area: 13.54 m^{2} (145.7 sq ft)
- Airfoil: Göttingen Gö 535
- Empty weight: 340 kg (750 lb)
- Max takeoff weight: 560 kg (1,235 lb)
- Powerplant: 1 × Salmson 9 AD 9-cylinder air-cooled radial engine, 30 kW (40 hp)

Performance

- Maximum speed: 141 km/h (88 mph, 76 kn)
- Stall speed: 68 km/h (42 mph, 37 kn)
- Range: 800 km (500 mi, 430 nmi)
- Endurance: 6 hours
- Service ceiling: 4,500 m (14,800 ft)
- Time to altitude: 8 min to 1,000 m (3,300 ft)

== See also ==
- Etrich Taube

Related development

- Volksflugzeug
