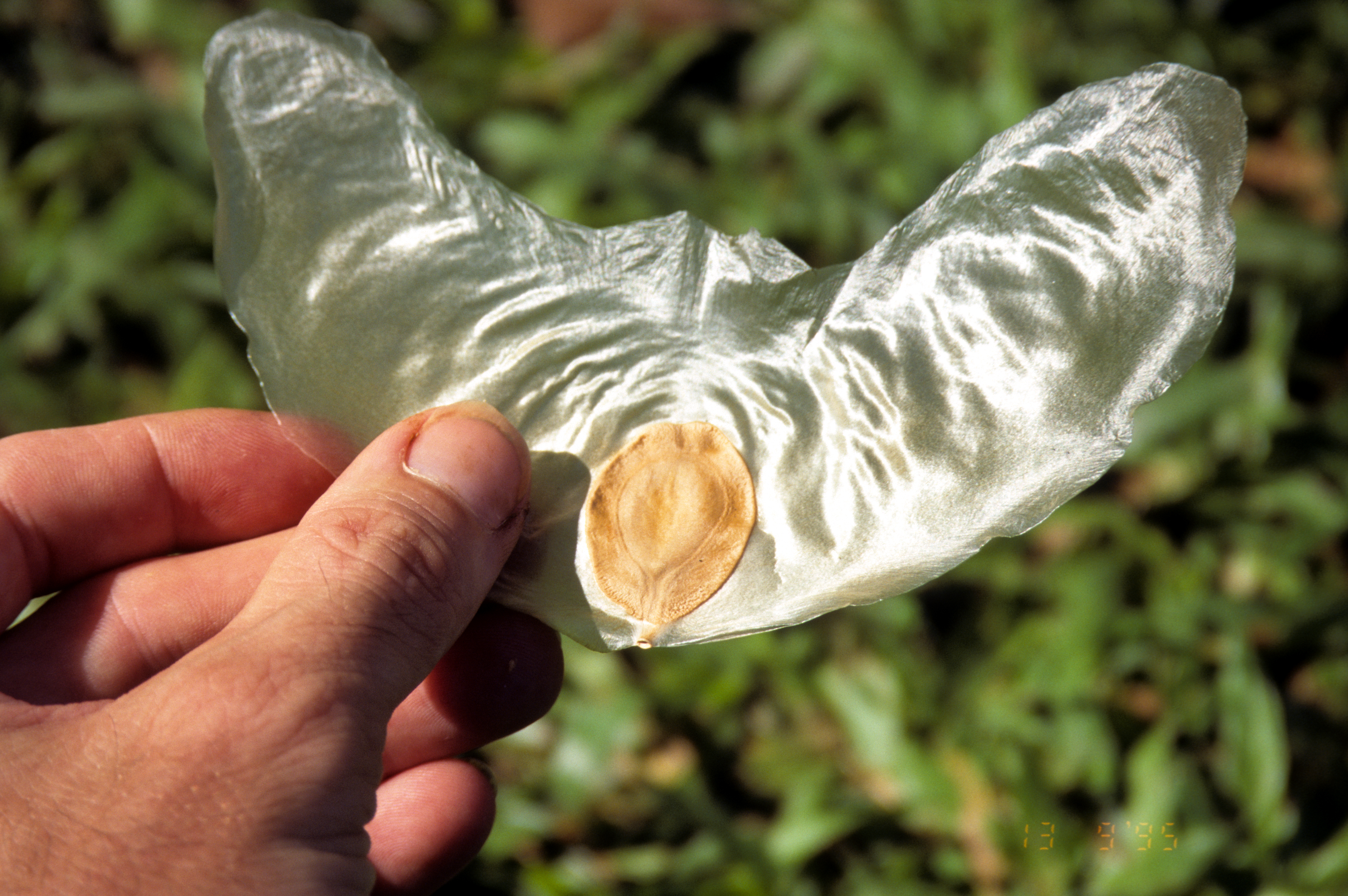

Scientific classification
- Kingdom: Plantae
- Clade: Tracheophytes
- Clade: Angiosperms
- Clade: Eudicots
- Clade: Rosids
- Order: Cucurbitales
- Family: Cucurbitaceae
- Genus: Alsomitra
- Species: A. macrocarpa

Binomial name
- Alsomitra macrocarpa (Blume) M.Roem.

= Alsomitra macrocarpa =

Javan cucumber

Species of fruit and plant

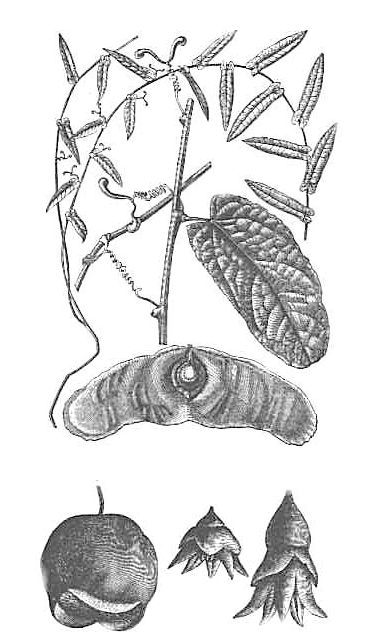
Opening fruit (some 30cm in diameter) (lower left), flowers (lower right), winged seed (center), twining stem with foliage (top) - Not to same scale Meyers großes Konversationslexikon

Alsomitra macrocarpa, commonly known as Javan cucumber, is a species of gourd-bearing liana belonging to the pumpkin family Cucurbitaceae. It is native to the tropical forests of Maritime Southeast Asia, as well as Thailand and New Guinea and its nearby islands.

== Taxonomy ==
The plant was first described under the name Zanonia macrocarpa in 1825 by Carl Ludwig Blume from fruiting material collected on Mount Parang in Java. In 1843 Max Joseph Roemer published it under the name Alsomitra macrocarpa, including 7 other ill-fitting species in the genus, a genus he did not define. In 1881 Alfred Cogniaux allocated the species to Macrozanonia macrocarpa. The current accepted name is Roemer's Alsomitra macrocarpa.

=== Etymology ===
The genus name Alsomitra is from the Latin for "grove mitre/fillet" and the species epithet macrocarpa means "large-fruited".

== Seed propagation ==
The fruits or pepos are football-sized (about 300mm diameter) and bell-shaped, suspended high in the forest canopy, and are densely packed with large numbers of seeds. Remarkably the seeds have large, papery wings and when ripe they fall from the underside of the fruit and glide long distances.

The seed or samara of this species is unusual in having two flat bracts extending either side of the seed to form a wing-like shape with the seed embedded along one long edge and the wings angled slightly back from it. As the seed ripens the wings dry and the long edge furthest from the seed curls slightly upwards. When ripe, a hole forms in the bottom of the gourd, the seeds drop off, and their aerodynamic form allows them to glide away from the tree. The wing spans around 13 centimetres (5 in) and can glide for long distances. The seed moves through the air like a butterfly in flight — it gains height, stalls, dips and accelerates, once again producing lift, a process termed phugoid oscillation. In the past it was often found on the decks of ships at sea.

== Inspiration in aviation ==
The seed's relative stability in flight was studied in the 1890s by Friedrich Ahlborn. Known generally as the Zanonia, it inspired several pioneers of early aviation, especially Igo Etrich.

The contemporary pioneer J.W. Dunne also studied the seed but discarded it as inspiration because, although it is stable in pitch and roll, it is not directionally stable.

Over a century later, in 2022, the seed's directional instability inspired the aerodynamic design of a gliding sensor. The device is intended for environmental monitoring and is biodegradable. In use, a flock of sensors would be released from an aircraft and would spread out in random directions as they glided down.

== See also ==
- Etrich Taube
- Flying wing
- Zanonia
