= Etrich Luft-Limousine =

Luft-Limousine
- Etrich Luft-Limousine

General information
- Type: Reconnaissance aircraft
- National origin: Austria-Hungary
- Manufacturer: Etrich
- Designer: Igo Etrich
- Primary user: KuKLFT
- Number built: 2

History
- First flight: 1912

The Luft-Limousine or Luftlimousine, also known as Etrich VIII Luft-Limousine, was a single engine monoplane built by the Etrich company in Silesia in 1912.

== Development ==
Fuselage with an enclosed cabin

The Luft-Limousine was designed by Igo Etrich, the builder of the Etrich Taube.

The plane was built in the 'Etrich Fliegerwerke' factory in Liebau (today Lubawka, Poland). It was an aircraft with a cabin for one pilot and a single passenger that was enclosed with wire gauze and celluloid windows, the reason for which Igo Etrich named it Luft-Limousine. The Luft-Limousine was the first military monoplane with an enclosed cabin. It was powered by a 60 hp Austro-Daimler engine.

== Operational history ==
The maiden flight of this plane took place in Josefstadt, only few kilometres south of Trautenau on 7 May 1912. During World War I the Luft-Limousine was used by the Austro-Hungarian army.

== Operators ==
Austria-Hungary

- Austro-Hungarian Imperial and Royal Aviation Troops

== Specifications ==
Data from

General characteristics

- Crew: Two, pilot and observer
- Length: 8 m (26 ft 3 in)
- Wingspan: 9.5 m (31 ft 2 in)
- Wing area: 26 m^{2} (280 sq ft)
- Powerplant: 1 × Austro-Daimler sidevalve engine, 45 kW (60 hp)

Performance

== See also ==
Related development

- Etrich Taube

Aircraft of comparable role, configuration, and era

- Albessard Aérobus

Related lists

- List of aircraft (pre-1914)
