= Etrich Taube =

1910 German multi-role aircraft family

Etrich-Rumpler Taube
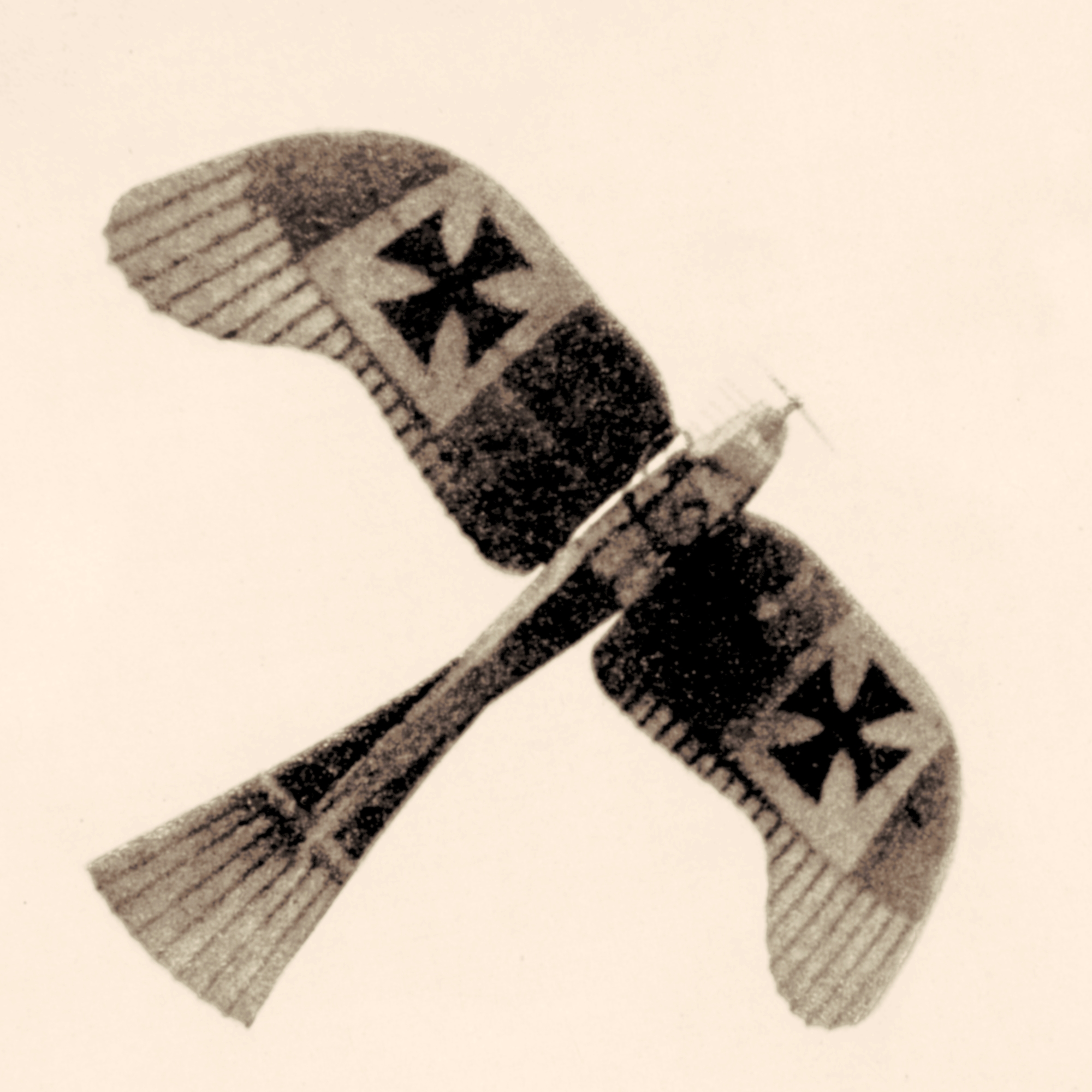

General information
- Type: Bomber, surveillance, and trainer
- Manufacturer: Various
- Designer: Igo Etrich
- Primary user: Luftstreitkräfte

History
- First flight: 1910

The Etrich Taube, also known by the names of the various later manufacturers who built versions of the type, such as the Rumpler Taube, was a pre-World War I monoplane aircraft. It was the first military aeroplane to be mass-produced in Germany.

The Taube was very popular prior to the First World War, and it was also used by the air forces of Italy and Austria-Hungary. Even the Royal Naval Air Service operated at least one Taube in 1912. On 1 November 1911, Giulio Gavotti, an Italian aviator, dropped the world's first aerial bomb from his Taube monoplane over the Ain Zara oasis in Libya. Once the war began, it quickly proved inadequate as a warplane and was soon replaced by other designs.

== Design and development ==
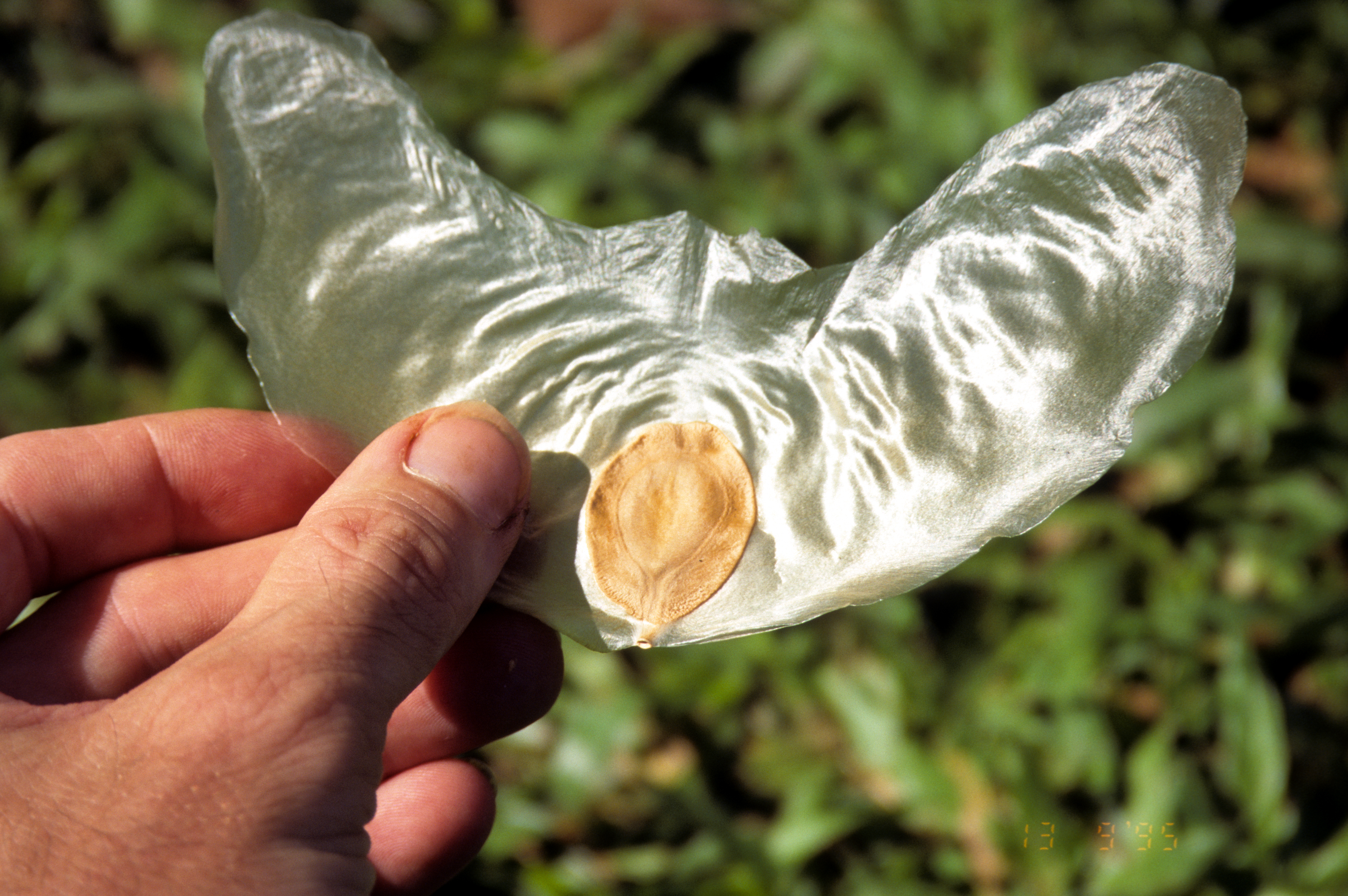
A gliding Zanonia seed

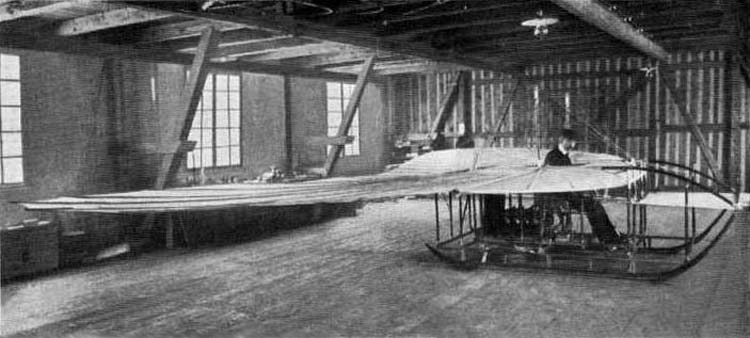
The Etrich-Wels glider prototype, with Igo Etrich in the cockpit

The Taube was designed in 1909 by Igo Etrich of Austria-Hungary, and first flew in 1910. It was licensed for serial production by Lohner-Werke in Austria and by Edmund Rumpler in Germany, now called the Etrich-Rumpler-Taube. Rumpler soon changed the name to Rumpler-Taube, and stopped paying royalties to Etrich, who subsequently abandoned his patent.

Despite its name (Taube means "dove"), the Taube's unique wing form was modeled, not after any bird, but rather copied from the seeds of Alsomitra macrocarpa (which may glide long distances from their parent tree). Etrich had tried to build a flying wing aircraft, based on the Zanonia wing shape, but the more conventional Taube type, with tail surfaces, was much more successful.

Etrich adopted the format of crosswind-capable main landing-gear, that Louis Blériot had used on his Blériot XI cross-channel monoplane, for better ground handling. The wing has three spars, and was braced by a cable-braced steel-tube truss (called a "bridge" - or Brücke in German) under each wing. At the outer end, the uprights of this structure were lengthened, to rise above the upper wing surfaces, and form kingposts, to carry bracing- and warping-wires for the enlarged wingtips. A small landing-wheel was sometimes mounted on the lower end of this kingpost, to protect it for landings, and to help guard against "ground loops".

Later Taube-type aircraft, from other manufacturers, replaced the Bleriot-type main-gear, with a simpler V-strut main-gear design, and also omitted the underwing "bridge" structure, to reduce drag.

Like many contemporary aircraft, especially monoplanes, the Taube used wing warping rather than ailerons for lateral (roll) control, and also warped the rear half of the stabilizer to function as the elevator. Only the vertical, twinned triangular rudder surfaces were usually hinged.

== Operational history ==
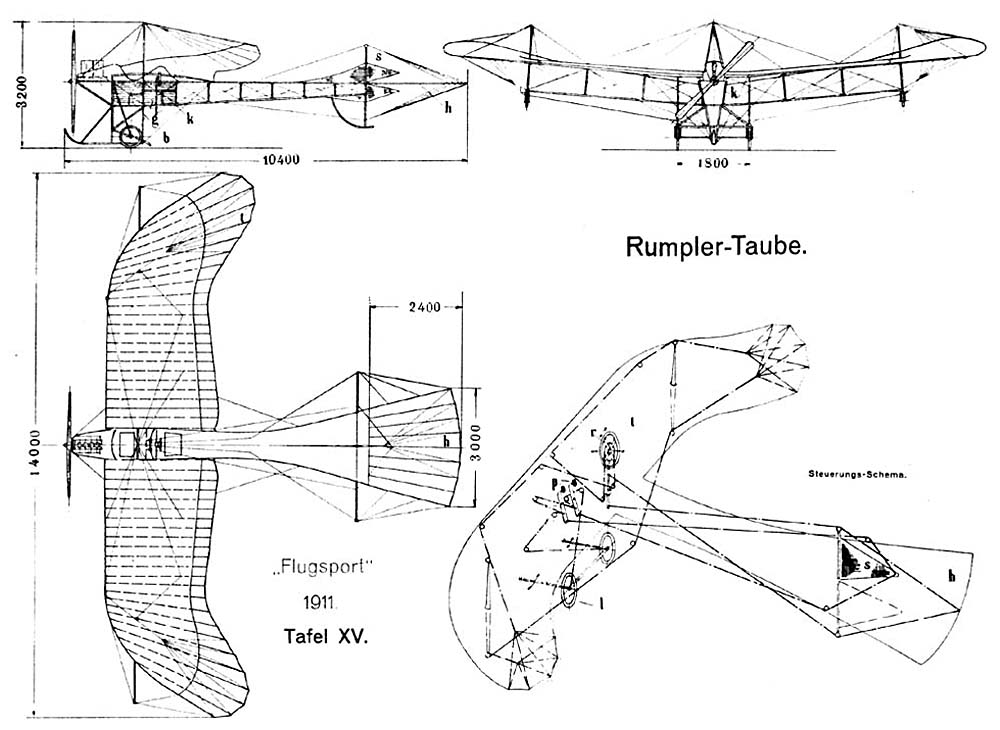
Design drawing of Taube from 1911

In civilian use, the Taube was used by pilots to win the Munich-Berlin Kathreiner prize. On 8 December 1911, Gino Linnekogel and Suvelick Johannisthal achieved a two-man endurance record for flying a Taube 4 hours and 35 minutes over Germany.

The design provided for very stable flight, which made it extremely suitable for observation. The translucent wings made it difficult for ground observers to detect a Taube at an altitude above 400 meters. The first hostile engagement was by an Italian Taube in 1911 in Libya, its pilot using pistols and dropping 2 kg (4.4 lb) grenades during the Battle of Ain Zara. The Taube was also used for bombing in the Balkans in 1912–13, and in late 1914 when German 3 kg (6.6 lb) bomblets and propaganda leaflets were dropped over Paris. Taube spotter planes detected the advancing Imperial Russian Army in East Prussia during the World War I Battle of Tannenberg.

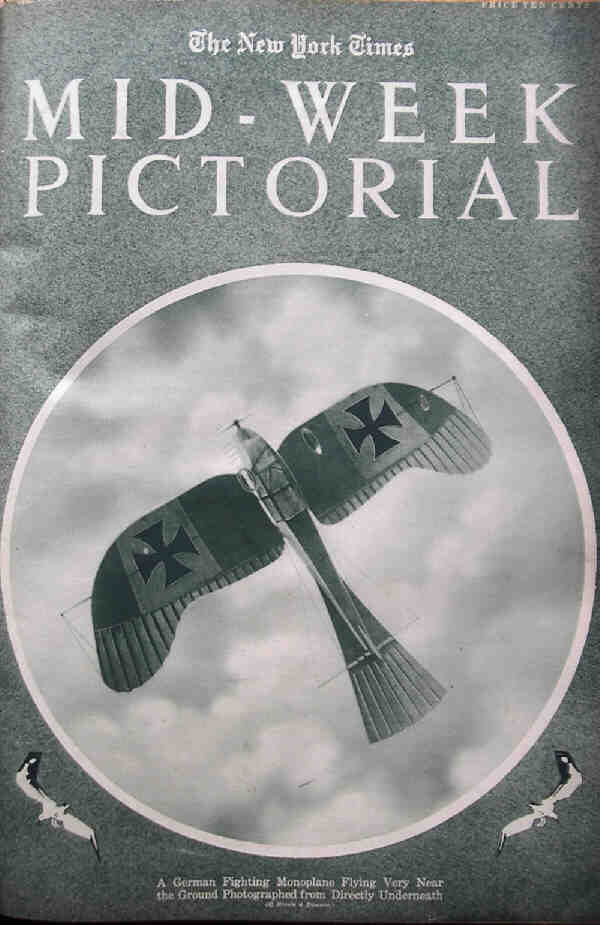
Front page of the New York Times Mid-Week Pictorial, 1 January 1917, captioned "A German Fighting Monoplane Flying Very Near the Ground Photographed from Directly Underneath."

== World War I ==
While initially there were two Taube aircraft assigned to Imperial German units stationed at Qingdao, China, only one was available at the start of the war due to an accident. The Rumpler Taube piloted by Lieutenant Gunther Plüschow had to face the attacking Japanese, who had with them a total of eight aircraft. On 2 October 1914, Plüschow's Taube attacked the Japanese warships blockading Tsingtao with two small bombs, but failed to score any hits. On 7 November 1914, shortly before the fall of Qingdao, Plüschow was ordered to fly top secret documents to Shanghai, but was forced to make an emergency landing at Lianyungang in Jiangsu, where he was interned by a local Chinese force. Plüschow was rescued by local Chinese civilians under the direction of an American missionary, and successfully reached his destination at Shanghai with his top secret documents, after giving the engine to one of the Chinese civilians who rescued him.

Poor rudder and lateral control made the Taube difficult and slow to turn. The aeroplane proved to be a very easy target for the faster and more agile Allied Scouts of the early part of World War I, and just six months into the war, the Taube had been removed from front line service to be used to train new pilots. Many future German aces would learn to fly in a Rumpler Taube.

== Variants ==
Due to the lack of licence fees, 14 companies built a large number of variations of the initial design, making it difficult for historians to determine the exact manufacturer based on historical photographs. An incomplete list is shown below. The most common version was the Rumpler Taube with two seats.

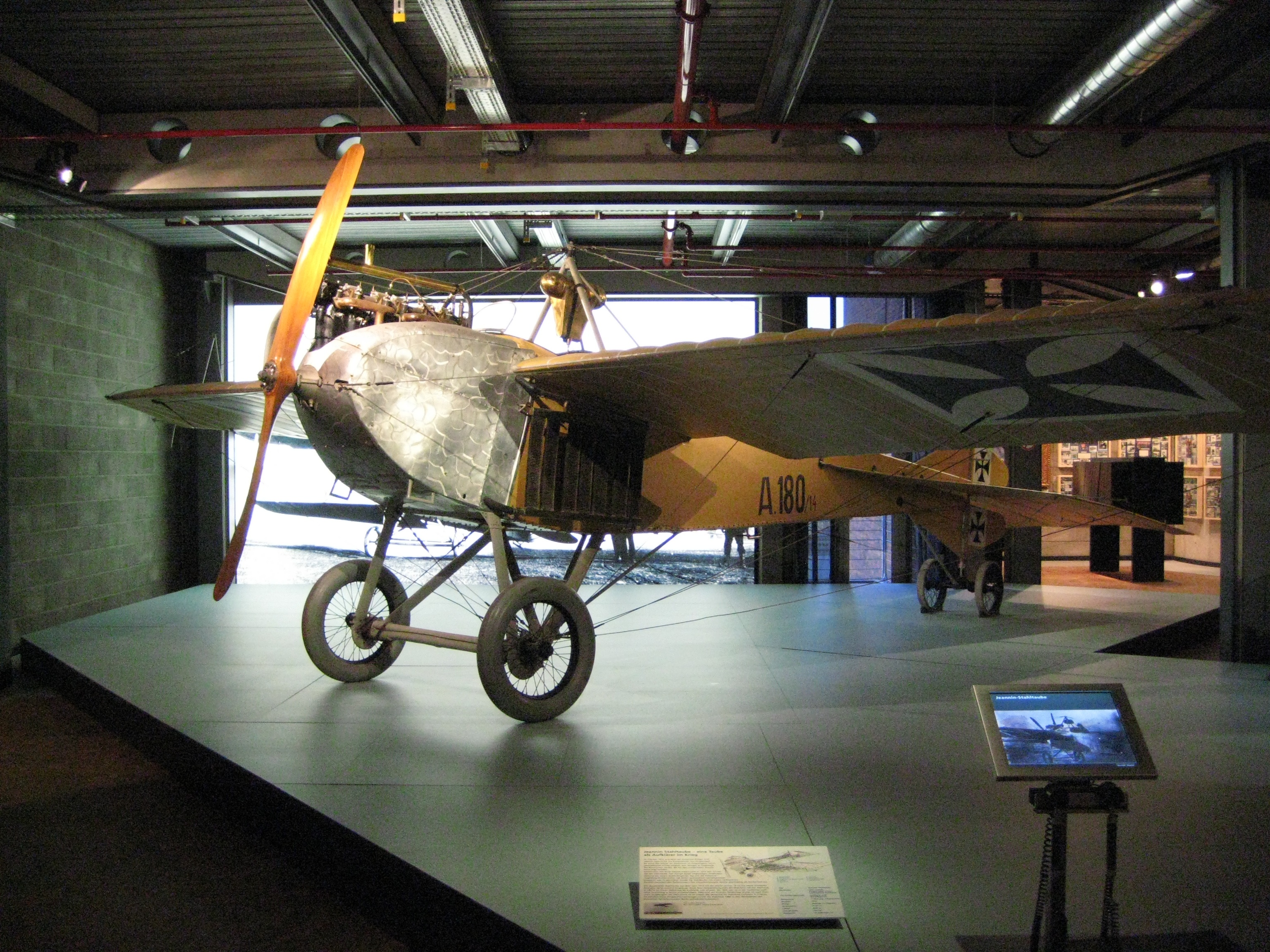
Jeannin Stahltaube, Deutsches Technikmuseum, Berlin

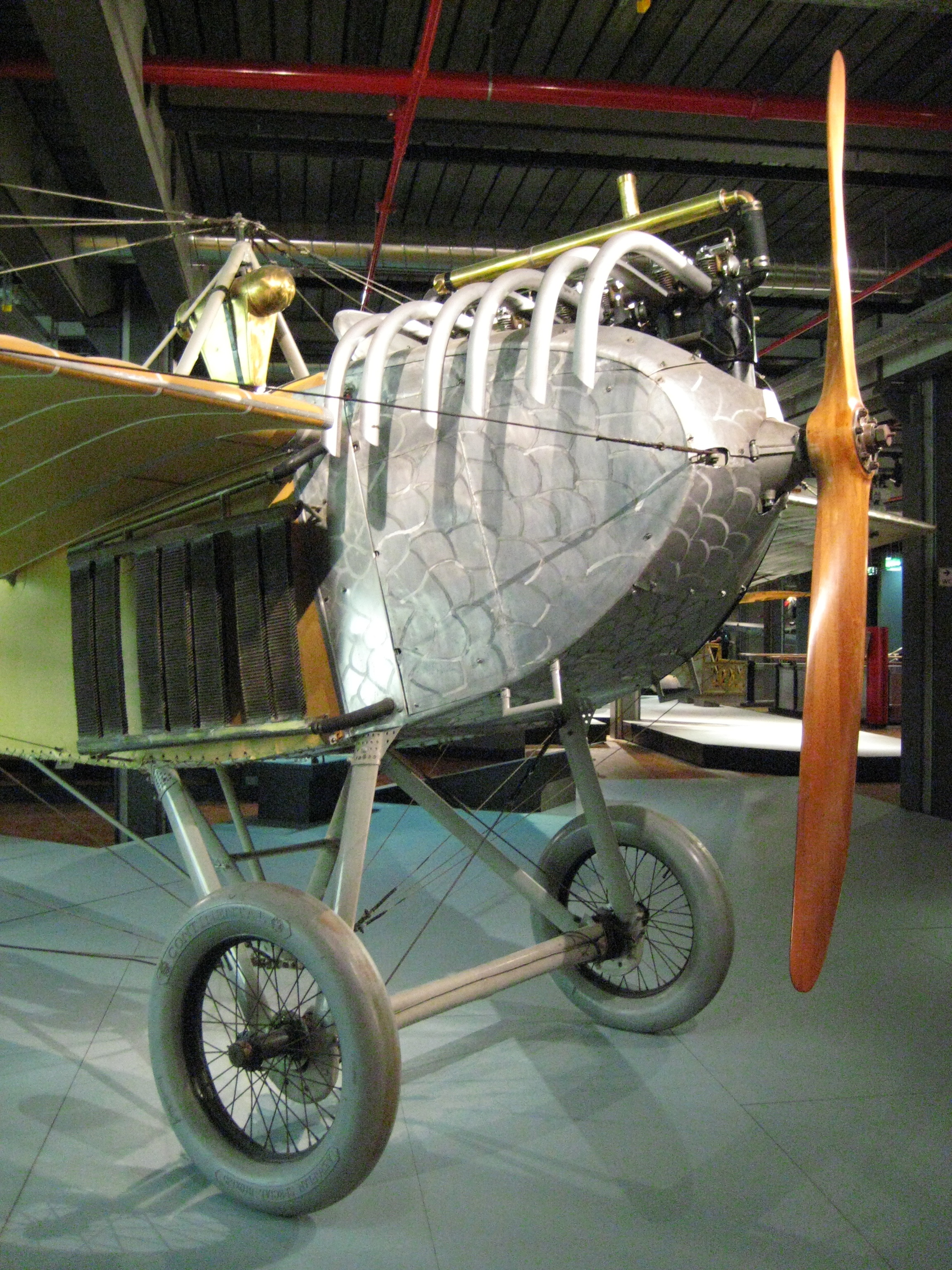
Jeannin Stahltaube

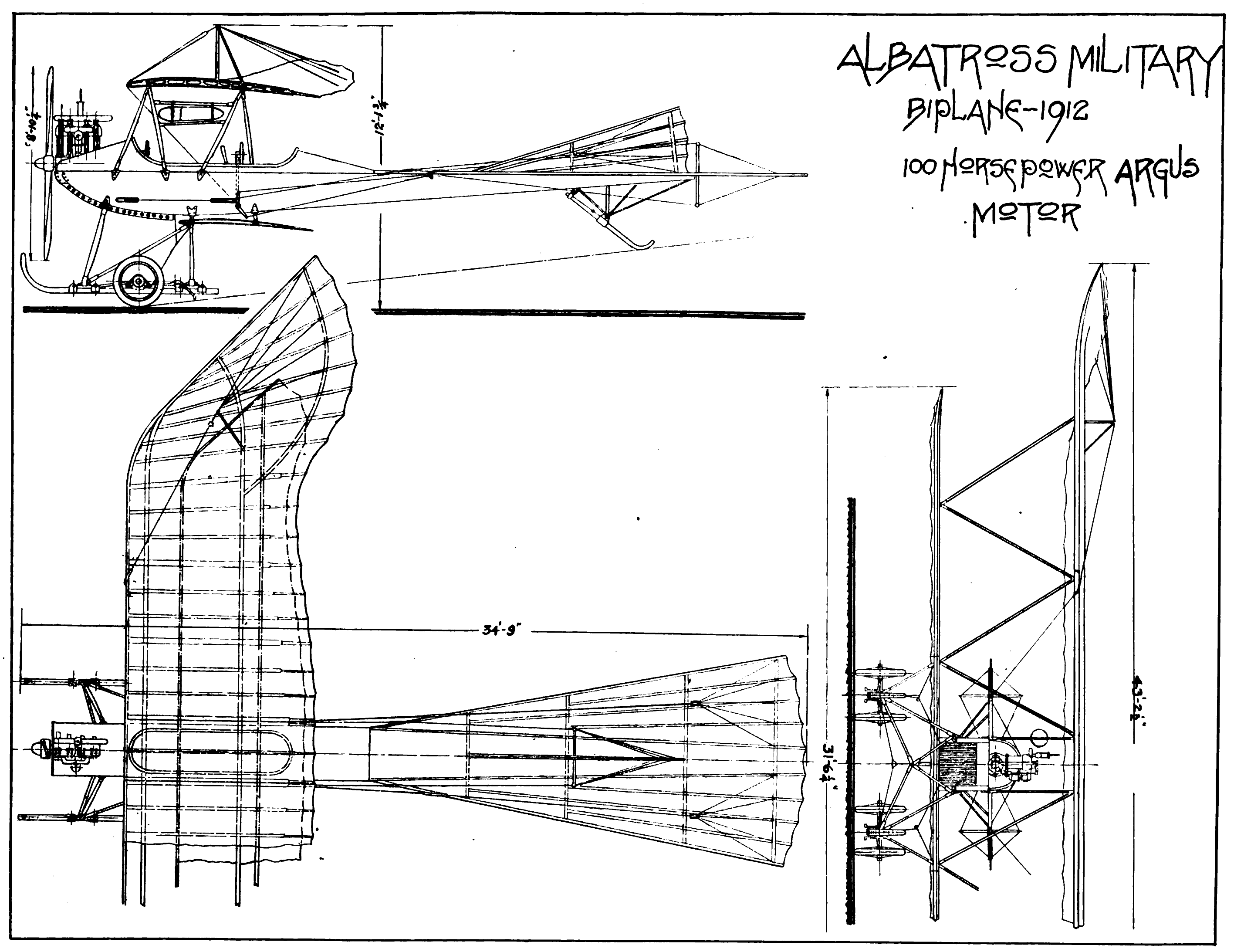
Line drawing of Albatros Doppeltaube from Aero and Hydro magazine

Albatros Taube
Produced by Albatros Flugzeugwerke
Albatros Doppeltaube
Biplane version produced by Albatros Flugzeugwerke.
Aviatik Taube
Produced by Automobil und Aviatik AG firm.
DFW Stahltaube (Stahltaube)
Version with steel frame produced by Deutsche Flugzeug-Werke.
Etrich Taube
Produced by inventor Igo Etrich.
Etrich-Rumpler-Taube
Initial name of the "Rumpler Taube".
Gotha Taube
Produced by Gothaer Waggonfabrik as LE.1, LE.2 and LE.3 (Land Eindecker – "Land Monoplane") and designated A.I by the Idflieg.
Harlan-Pfeil-Taube
Halberstadt Taube III
Produced by Halberstädter Flugzeugwerke.
Jeannin Taube (Jeannin Stahltaube)
Version with steel tubing fuselage structure.
Kondor Taube
Produced by Kondor Flugzeugwerke.
RFG Taube
Produced by Reise- und Industrieflug GmbH (RFG).
Roland Taube
Rumpler 4C Taube
Produced by Edmund Rumpler's Rumpler Flugzeugwerke.
Rumpler Delfin-Taube (Rumpler Kabinentaube "Delfin")
Version with closed cabin, produced by Rumpler Flugzeugwerke.
Isobe Rumpler Taube
A Taube built in Japan by Onokichi Isobe

== Operators ==
Argentine Republic

- Argentine Air Force
- Argentine Navy

Austria-Hungary

- Austro-Hungarian Imperial and Royal Aviation Troops

Kingdom of Bulgaria

- Bulgarian Air Force

Republic of China (1912–1949)

- Two units were ordered by Chinese revolutionaries to fight Imperial Qing China, but when they reached Shanghai in December 1911 with other Taube aircraft ordered by Imperial German forces stationed in China, the Qing dynasty had already been overthrown and the aircraft were not used in battle.

German Empire

- Luftstreitkräfte
- Kaiserliche Marine

Kingdom of Italy

- Corpo Aeronautico Militare

Empire of Japan

- The Imperial Aeronautic Association
- Imperial Japanese Army Air Service (acting)

Norway

- Royal Norwegian Navy Air Service

Kingdom of Romania

- Romanian Air Corps - One Taube with a Mercedes 100 hp engine, delivered from Germany in 1913

Ottoman Empire

- Ottoman Air Force

Switzerland

- Swiss Air Force

== Survivors and flyable reproductions ==
The Technisches Museum Wien has the only remaining Etrich-built Taube, which has a four-cylinder engine.

Other original Taubes exist, such as one in Norway, which was the last original Taube to fly under its own power, in 1922.

The Museum of Flight in Seattle features a reproduction of a Rumpler Taube.

The Owl's Head Transportation Museum in Owls Head, Maine, US has a reproduction which has been flying since 1990, using a 200 hp (150 kW) Ranger L-440 inline-6 air-cooled engine.

There is also a 1932 replica of the Etrich Taube in the Polish Aviation Museum in Krakow.

== Specifications (late model Rumpler Taube) ==
Austrian Aviation commemorative coin

Data from Wilkins

General characteristics

- Crew: 2
- Length: 8.2 m (27 ft)
- Wingspan: 14 m (46 ft)
- Wing area: 28 m^{2} (300 sq ft)
- Max takeoff weight: 835 kg (1,840 lb)
- Useful lift: 180 kg (400 lb)
- Powerplant: 1 × Mercedes D.I 6-cyl. water-cooled piston engine, 75 kW (100 hp)
- Propellers: 2-bladed Reschke tractor, 2.6 m (8 ft 6 in) diameter

Performance

- Maximum speed: 119 km/h (74 mph, 64 kn)
- Endurance: 4 hours
- Time to altitude: 792 m (2,600 ft) in 6 mins

== See also ==
- History of aviation

Related development

- Etrich Sport-Taube
- Etrich Luft-Limousine
