= Italian colonial railways =

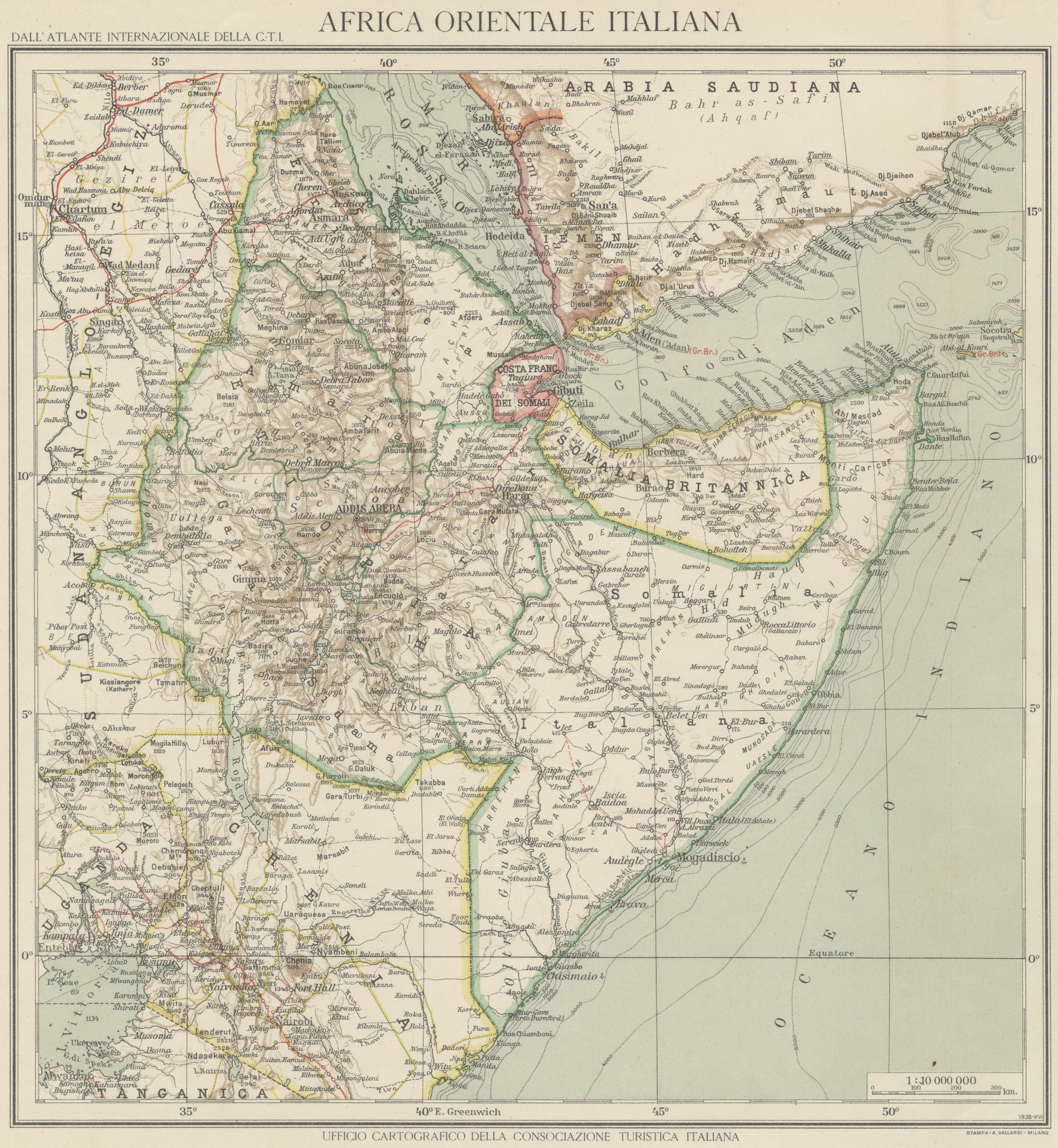
1938 map of Italian East Africa. Enlarge to see detailed maps of the railways in use (red color) and those in construction (red segments)

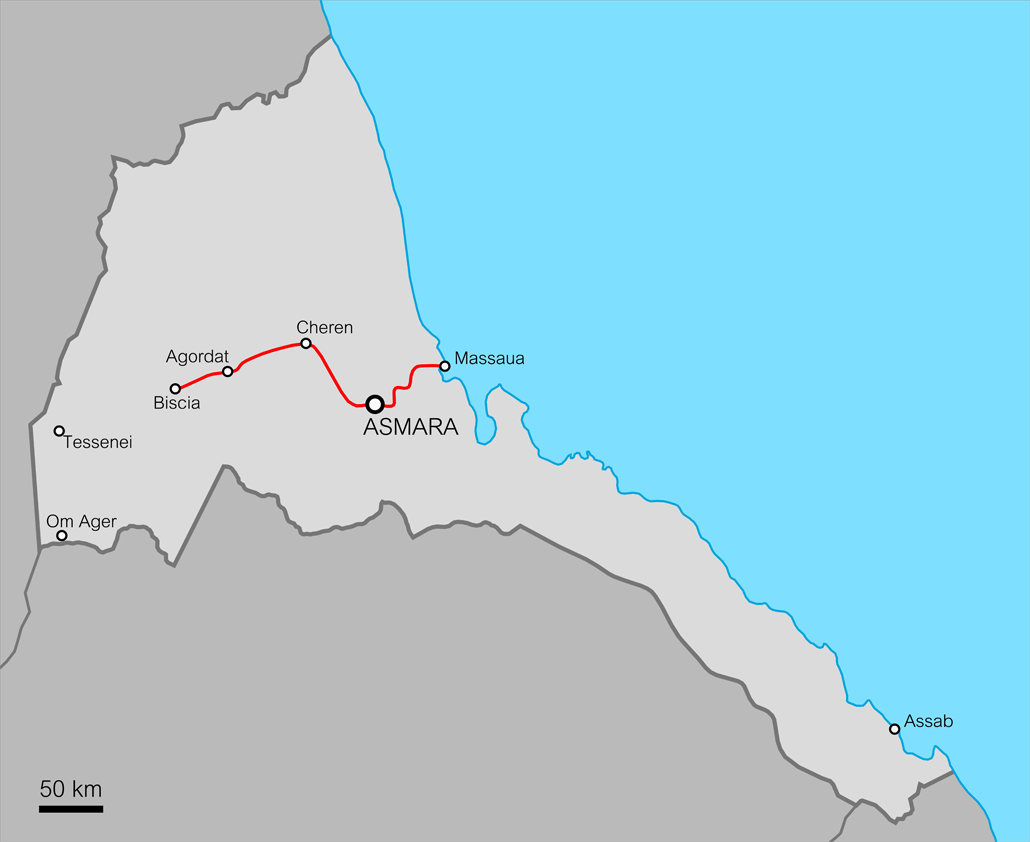
The original Massawa(Mitsiwa'e)-Asmara-Bishia Railway in Italian Eritrea, active between 1887 and 1941

The Italian colonial railways started with the opening in 1888 of a short section of line in Italian Eritrea, and ended in 1943 with the loss of Italian Libya after the Allied offensive in North Africa and the destruction of the railways around Italian Tripoli. The colonial railways of the Kingdom of Italy reached 1,561 kilometres (970 mi) before WWII.

== History ==
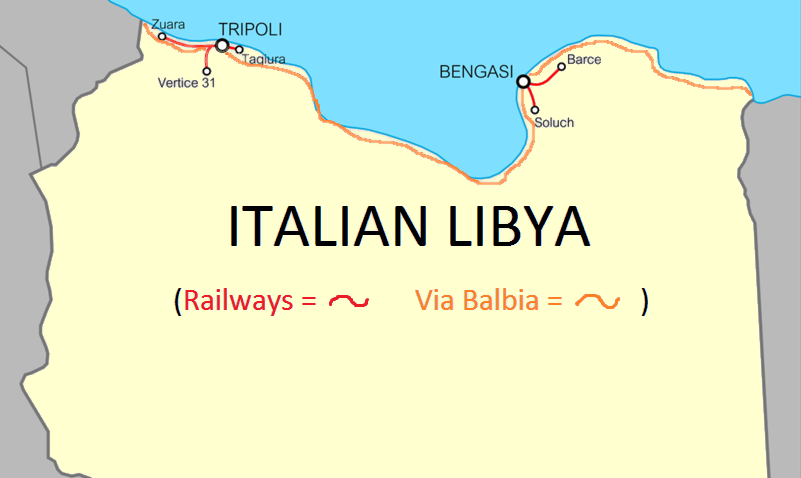
Railways -in red color- in 1940 Italian Libya

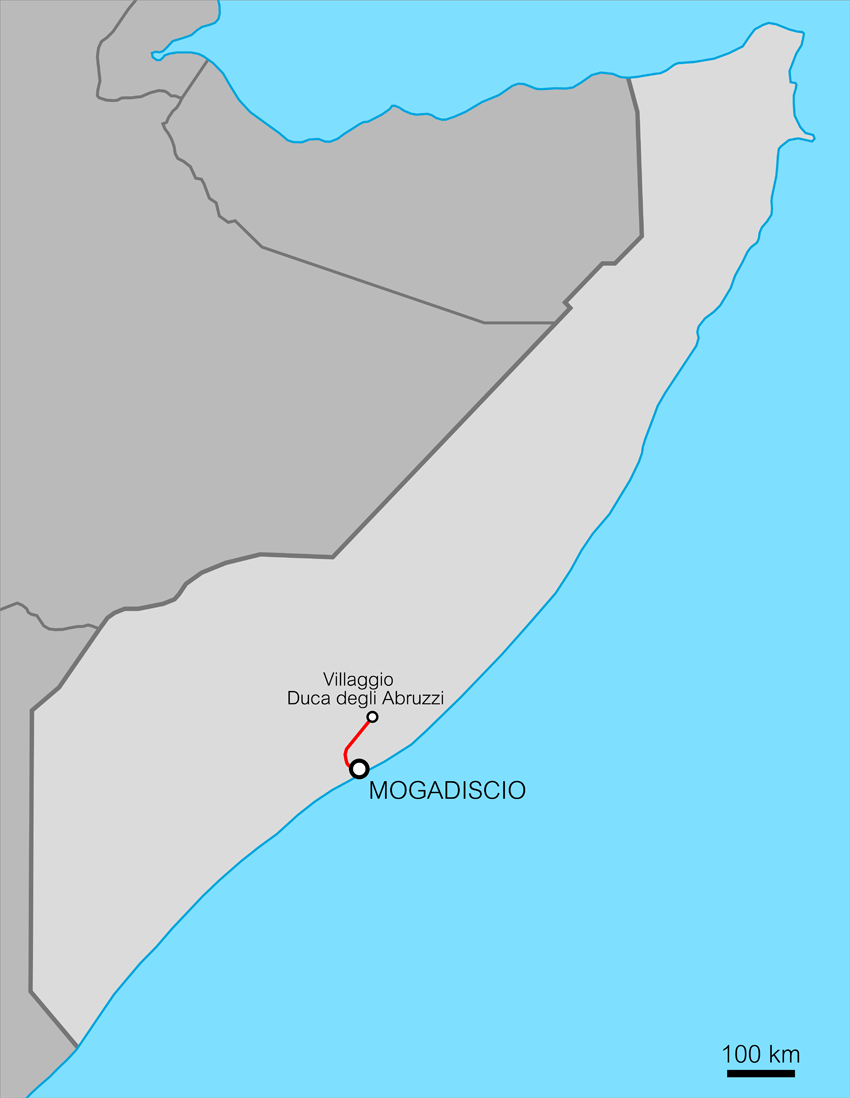
Italian Somalia's railway

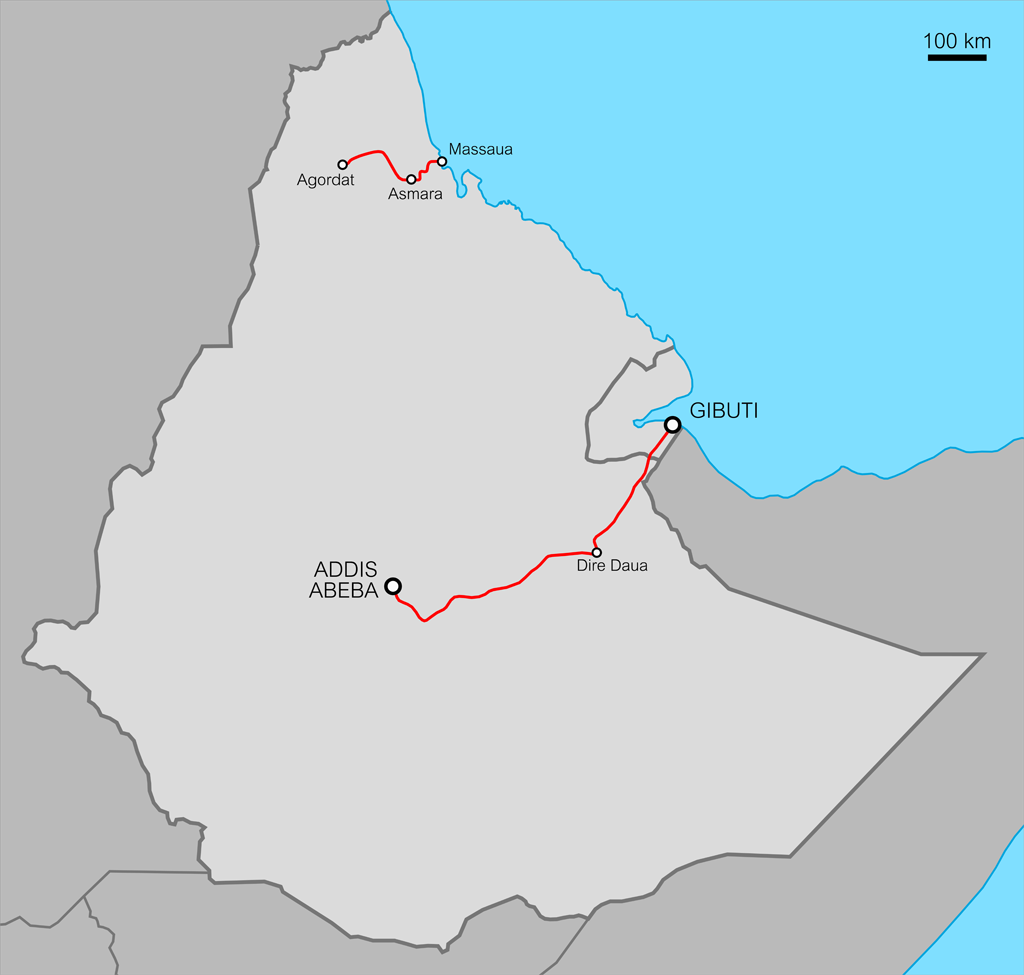
Map showing the Ethio-Djibouti railway

The construction of railways in the African Italian colonies (Eritrea, Libya and Somalia) did not have, for various reasons, a great development compared to that promoted by other European countries on the same continent.

The first rail lines were built mainly for war needs in the absence of efficient means of communication in the occupied territories, after the conquests of Eritrea and Libya. However, were quite limited in the first decades of occupation. In 1940 the amount of railways in operation, between Italian East Africa and Libya, amounted to 1,556 km of which, however, the 693 km of the Italian section of the Railway Djibouti-Addis Ababa were pre-existing and built by the French Empire for Ethiopia.

The railways were built by Italy from the outset with little potential, because built with narrow gauge rails and with light metal type, and were never of great economic importance because isolated from the lines of neighboring states. Indeed, the choice of a gauge 950 mm (3 ft 1 3/8 in), different from the meter gauge usually used in Africa, contributed to this effect. Today most of these Italian colonial railways have disappeared: those of Somalia after the British occupation in 1941–1945. The Libyan ones were suppressed in the 1960s, but in the same decade the Eritrean railway between Italian Asmara and Massawa was reactivated after long neglect of trafficking.

== Projects ==
In 1940 there were some projects of new colonial railways in the Italian Empire:

- Tripoli-Benghazi in Libya (1,000 km in construction since summer 1941)
- Tripoli-border Tunisia (in construction since June 1941)
- Assab-Dire Dawa in Ethiopia & Eritrea
- Kassala-Agordat in Eritrea & Sudan

Two international projects were studied for decades, but never done because of excessive financial difficulties:

- Italian "Transaharan railway" (Tripoli-Tchad/Camerun) between Libia and the Gulf of Guinea
- Asmara-Addis Abeba-Mogadiscio (since the 1890s projected and allowed by international Treaties)

All these projects were stopped by the WW2 defeat of Italy.

== Italian colonial railways resumen ==
In 1940 the Italian colonial railways had 1,561 km and were the following:

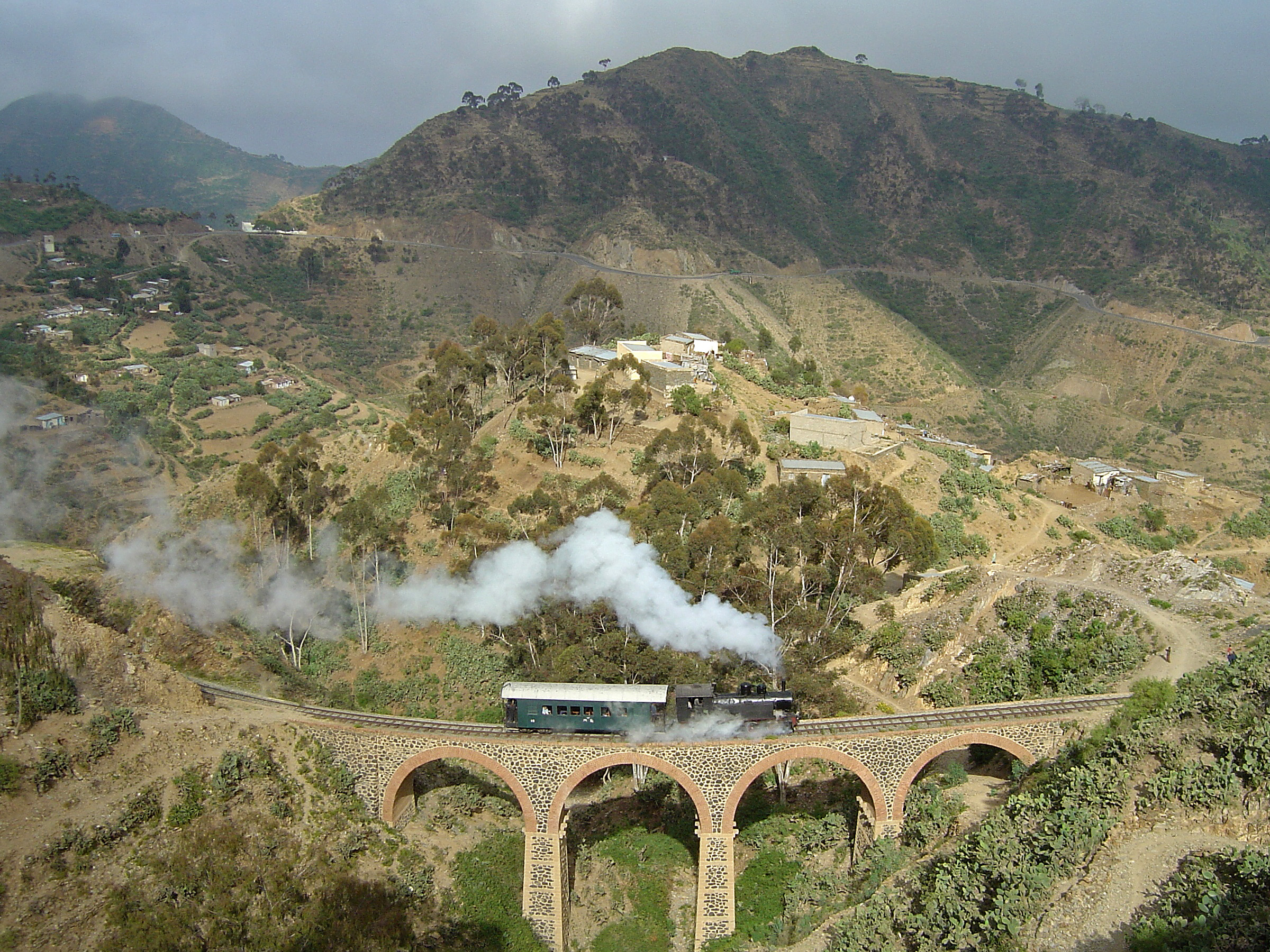
Eritrean railway, that now connects only Massawa and Asmara, showing an Italian "class 440 locomotive" at work on the mountainous section between Arbaroba and Asmar

Railway name	Km	Years when built	Colony
Addis Abeba–Gibuti	684 kmOnly Ethiopia section	1902-1917	Africa Orientale Italiana (Ethiopia)
Asmara–Biscia	227 km	1914–1932	Africa Orientale Italiana (Eritrea)
Bengasi–Soluch	56 km	1926	Italian Libya
Bengasi–Barce	108 km	1914–1927	Italian Libya
Massaua–Asmara	118 km	1901–1911	Africa Orientale Italiana (Eritrea)
Massaua–Saati	26 km	1886–1887	Africa Orientale Italiana (Eritrea)
Mogadiscio–Villaggio Duca degli Abruzzi	113 km	1924–1927	Africa Orientale Italiana (Somalia)
Tripoli–Tagiura	21 km	1912	Italian Libya
Tripoli–Vertice 31	90 km	1912–1915	Italian Libya
Tripoli–Zuara	118 km	1912–1919	Italian Libya
Ferrovie coloniali italiane (Italian colonial railways)	1,561 km		

With the above railways there were some decauville railways, like:

- Mersa Matuma–Kululi (Italian Eritrea): Nearly 90 km south of Massaua was built the so-called "Potash Transport Railway". It was a 42 kilometres (26 mi) long 600 mm (1 ft 11 5/8 in) gauge potash transport railway built to serve the locations Adaito and Badda, located between Massawa and Assab. A Decauville gauge line was built in 1905 by the Italians inside the port of Mersa Fatuma and from it into the hinterland until Kululi (called "Colulli" in Italian) near the Ethiopian border.
- Villabruzzi–Ferfer (Italian Somalia). A small 600 mm (1 ft 11 5/8 in) gauge railway of 250 km was constructed between Villabruzzi and the Somalia-Ethiopia border in order to solve the logistical problems related to the occupation of Ethiopia. In 1928–1936, the track was initially built in sections until Buloburde. The first railway section was 130 km long. It started in Bivio Adalei of the Mogadishu-Villaggio Duca degli Abruzzi railway. In summer 1940, at the beginning of the Second World War, the line was extended by the Italian army by about 150 km: the railway reached Ferfer, near the present-day Somalia-Ethiopia border.
- Genale–Afgoi (Italian Somalia). In 1924, a minor railway was built in the area just west of Italian Mogadishu and it had a small track in 600 mm gauge: the Genale-Afgoi decauville. The little railway was 46 km long and united the farming settlement of Genale with Afgoi on the Mogadishu-Villagio Duca degli Abruzzi route. Construction was managed by the "Società Agricola Italo Somala" (SAIS), which opened the track so that its plantations' powered sugar cane could be transported to the Mogadishu Port.

== See also ==
- Eritrean Railway
- Mogadishu-Villabruzzi Railway
- Ferrovie dello Stato
