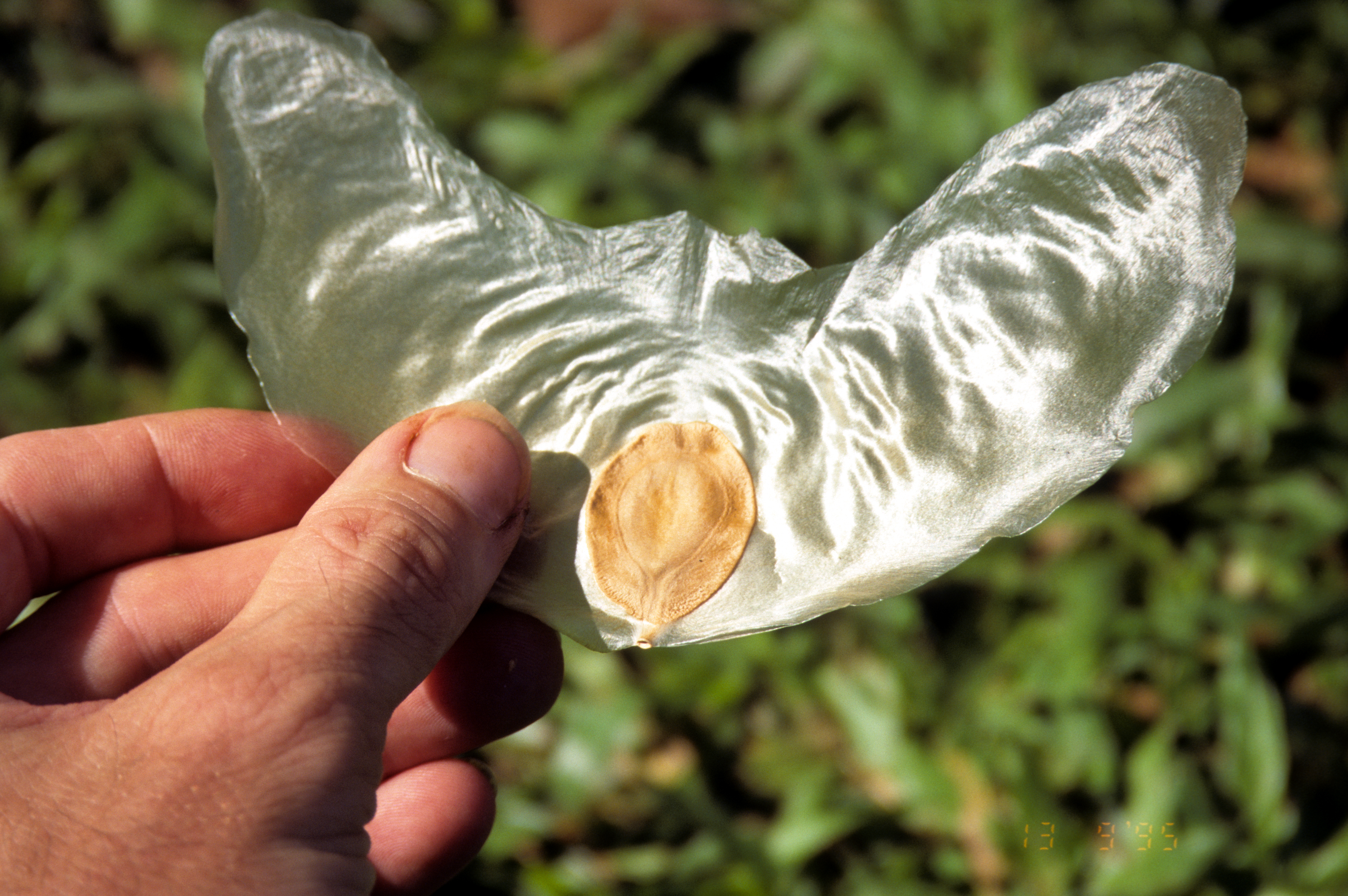
- Alsomitra macrocarpa seed

Scientific classification
- Kingdom: Plantae
- Clade: Embryophytes
- Clade: Tracheophytes
- Clade: Angiosperms
- Clade: Eudicots
- Clade: Rosids
- Order: Cucurbitales
- Family: Cucurbitaceae
- Tribe: Gomphogyneae
- Genus: Alsomitra; L.

Species
- See text

Synonyms
- Macrozanonia Cogn.; Zanonia Blume

= Alsomitra =

Genus of flowering plants

Alsomitra is a genus of the plant family Cucurbitaceae (the cucumber, squash, and pumpkin family).

The seeds of Alsomitra macrocarpa are among the largest winged seeds in the plant kingdom and their shape inspired a number of aviation pioneers.

== Selected species ==
- Alsomitra angulata
- Alsomitra angustipetala
- Alsomitra balansae
- Alsomitra beccariana
- Alsomitra brasiliensis
- Alsomitra capricornica
- Alsomitra macrocarpa - Javan cucumber
