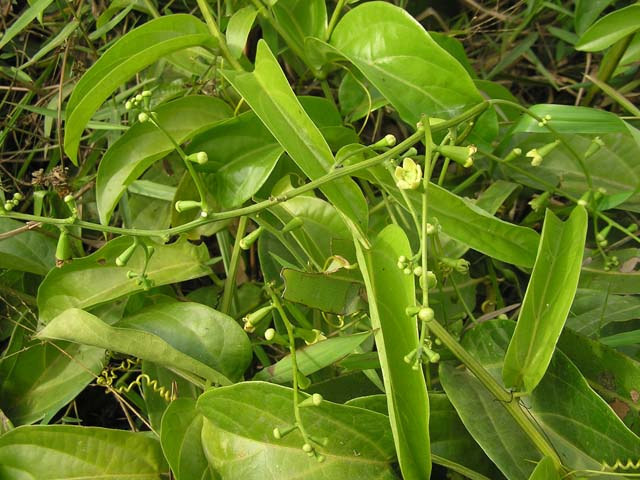

Scientific classification
- Kingdom: Plantae
- Clade: Embryophytes
- Clade: Tracheophytes
- Clade: Angiosperms
- Clade: Eudicots
- Clade: Rosids
- Order: Cucurbitales
- Family: Cucurbitaceae
- Tribe: Zanonieae
- Genus: Zanonia; L.
- Species: Z. indica

Binomial name
- Zanonia indica L.

Synonyms
- Juppia Merr.; Penar-valli Adans. (nom. illeg.)

= Zanonia =

Genus of flowering plants

Zanonia is a monotypic genus in the flowering plant family Cucurbitaceae (the cucumber, squash, and pumpkin family).

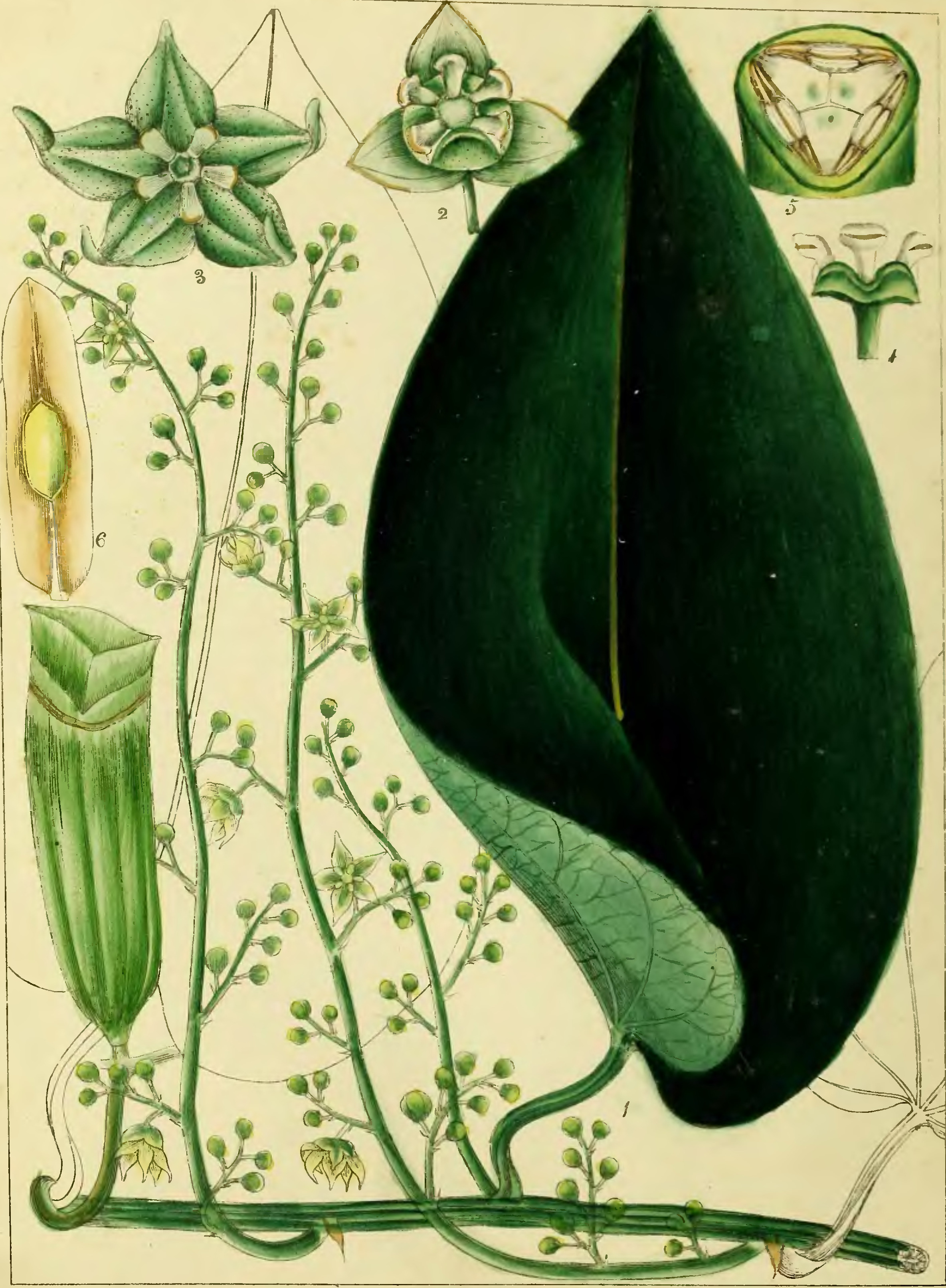
Botanical illustration of Zanonia indica.

The only species is Zanonia indica, a medium-sized liana found in the Indian subcontinent and Southeast Asia east to New Guinea. It has a number of subspecies.

At one time a number of Alsomitra species were classified among the Zanonia.
