= Battle of Ain Zara =

Part of the Italo-Turkish War in 1911

- Part of the Italo-Turkish War
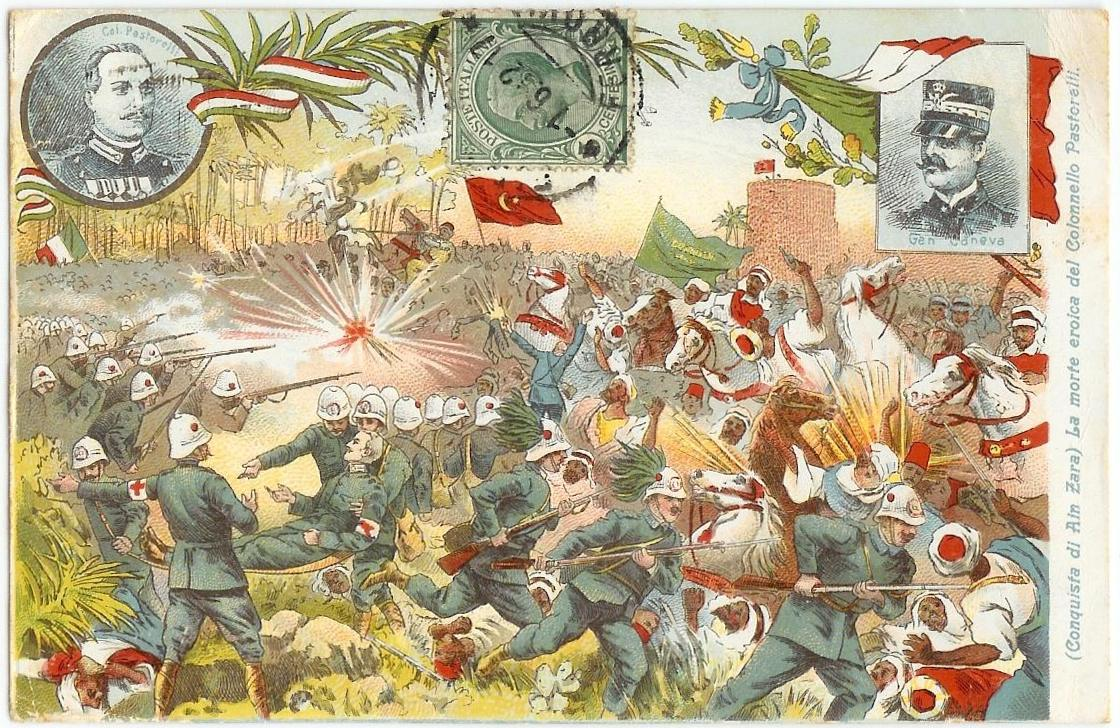
- Postcard commemorating the battle
Date	4 December 1911
Location	Ain Zara Oasis; Ottoman Tripolitania (now Libya) 32°49′N 13°16′E
Result	Italian victory: Taking of Tripoli

Belligerents
Kingdom of Italy	Ottoman Empire; Senussi Order

Commanders and leaders
Guglielmo Pecori Giraldi	Neşat Bey

Strength
12,000 men	8,000 men

Casualties and losses
(Kingdom of Italy) 17 killed and 171 wounded	(Ottoman Empire) 50+ killed, 50 wounded 100+ killed, many wounded

The Battle of Ain Zara was fought in December 1911 during the Italo-Turkish War between the Kingdom of Italy and Ottoman Empire forces for the control of the oasis of Ain Zara, near Tripoli in modern Libya, where the Ottomans had established a fortified base.

== Background ==
In October 1911, after the outbreak of the Italo-Turkish War, Italian troops landed in Tripolitania and captured Tripoli. Before being able to complete the occupation of Tripoli, the Italian forces needed to eliminate the threat posed by Ain Zara, an oasis 8 km south of Tripoli, which the Ottoman forces (including native Arab forces) had turned into a well-fortified position, garrisoned by 8,000 men with a battery of eight 87 mm Krupp guns. This was one of the most important Ottoman Army bases in Tripolitania, and several Ottoman counterattacks against Italian positions near Tripoli were launched from there.

== Battle ==
On 4 December, an Italian force of 12,000 men in three columns moved towards Ain Zara. The right column was led by General Guglielmo Pecori Giraldi and formed by the “Giardina” and “Lequio” Brigades, the former consisting of the 6th and 40th Infantry Regiments (two battalions each) and the latter composed of two Grenadiers of Sardinia battalions, the Alpini Battalion “Fenestrelle” and the 11th Bersaglieri Regiment. The center column, led by General Luigi Rainaldi, included the 82nd and 84th Infantry Regiments and a mountain battery; the left column, led by Colonel Amari and tasked with capturing Point 38 (known to the Italians as the Fornaci Hill), consisted of two battalions of the 52nd Infantry Regiment. The operation was supported by Italian naval artillery. A force led by General Di Chaurand carried out a diversionary attack with a battalion of the 93rd Infantry Regiment, two companies of the 18th Infantry Regiment and two sapper companies.

Rainaldi's column carried out a frontal attack under the fire of the Ottoman artillery, countered by Italian 149 mm guns and 210 mm howitzers, while Giardina's brigade executed a flanking maneuver. Ottoman forces attempted some counterattacks, but these were repelled. At 3:00 P.M. the Ottoman troops, threatened with encirclement by Giardina's brigade, started to withdraw from the oasis, abandoning all their artillery. Pecori Giraldi's column thus occupied the positions at Ain Zara, whereas Amari's column, whose attacks had not been successful, was recalled as its action was no longer needed. During the following day, Italian infantry and cavalry mopped up the surrounding area, pursuing the Ottoman-Arab forces and capturing some caravans as well as four camps and a considerable booty of weapons, ammunition, tents, provisions and livestock.

Italian casualties amounted to one officer (Colonel Giovanni Pastorelli of the 40th Infantry Regiment, who was posthumously awarded the Gold Medal of Military Valor) and 16 soldiers killed, and eight officers and 163 soldiers wounded. Turkish losses were estimated as more than 50 killed, including two officers, and over 50 wounded; Arab casualties included more than 100 killed.

== Aftermath ==
After capturing the oasis, Italian forces fortified the area and built a new railway section that linked Ain Zara to Tripoli.

In January 1912, Ottoman forces attempted a counterattack with some 4,000 men (500 Turkish regulars and 3,500 Arabs) in the attempt to recapture the Ain Zara positions. The Italian command, however, had learned of this plan and reinforced the Ain Zara defenses, that were augmented to three infantry regiments (the 6th, 40th, and 50th), the 2nd Grenadier Battalion, the Alpini Battalion “Mondovì” and some artillery batteries. After some skirmishes that occurred on 27 January, the Ottoman forces launched their attack on 28 January; Turkish and Arabs forces attempted to encircle and capture the Italian positions, but were driven off by artillery and machine gun fire. At 10 in the morning the attack was called off, and the Ottoman forces retreated. Italian casualties amounted to three soldiers killed and 15 wounded, Ottoman casualties were unknown.

Ain Zara remained in Italian hands for the remainder of the war. While digging some trenches in the area, the 33rd Bersaglieri Battalion discovered an ancient Roman mosaic pavement, presumably belonging to the ancient Roman city of Oea. The discovery made news in the Italian press, and the pavement was carefully removed and sent to Italy.

== See also ==
- Italo-Turkish War
