= Mount Parang =

Mountain in West Java, Indonesia

- Gunung Parang
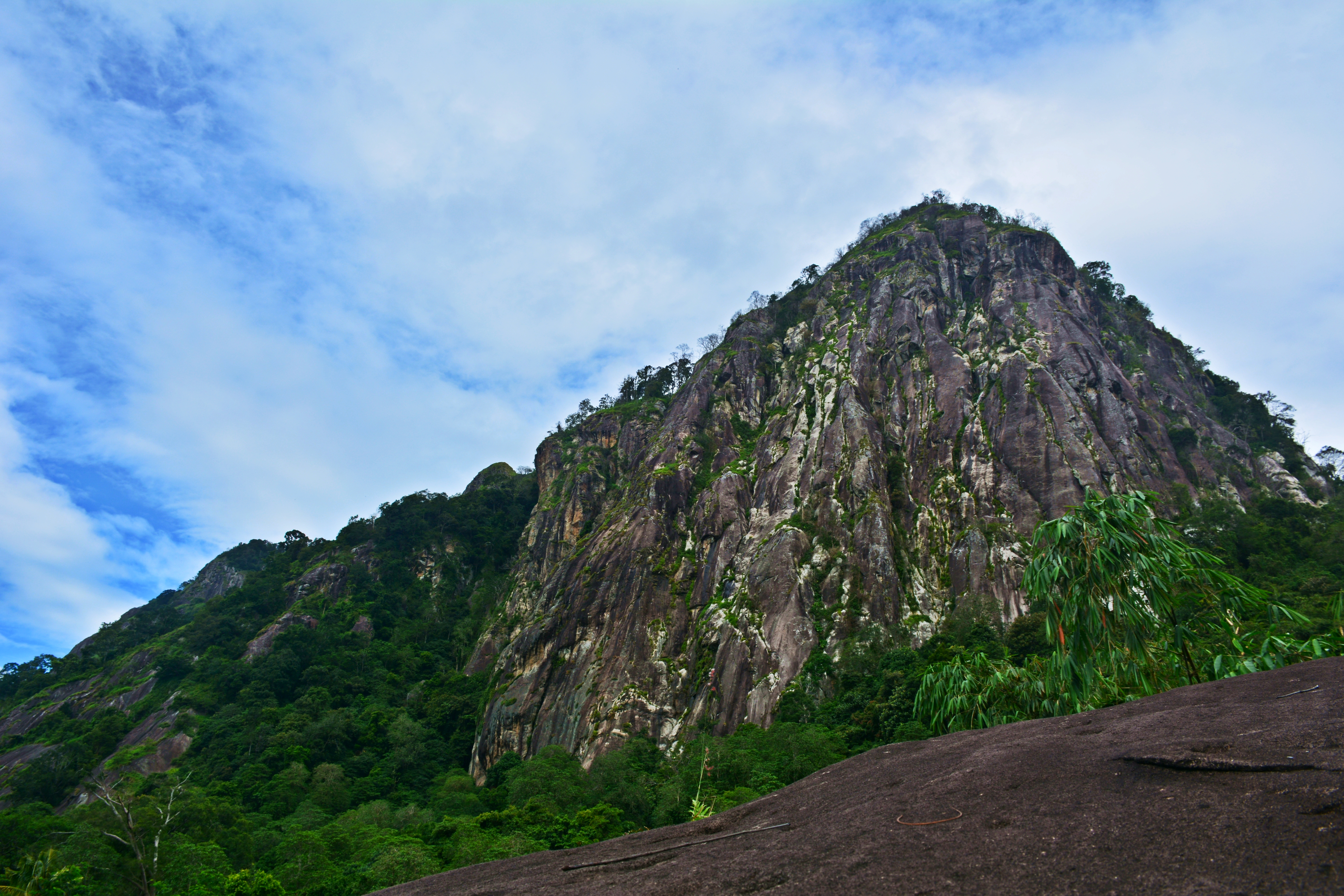
- Mount Parang

Highest point
- Elevation: 963 m (3,159 ft)
- Coordinates: 6°35′29″S 107°20′48″E

Geography
- Location within Java
- Location: West Java, Indonesia

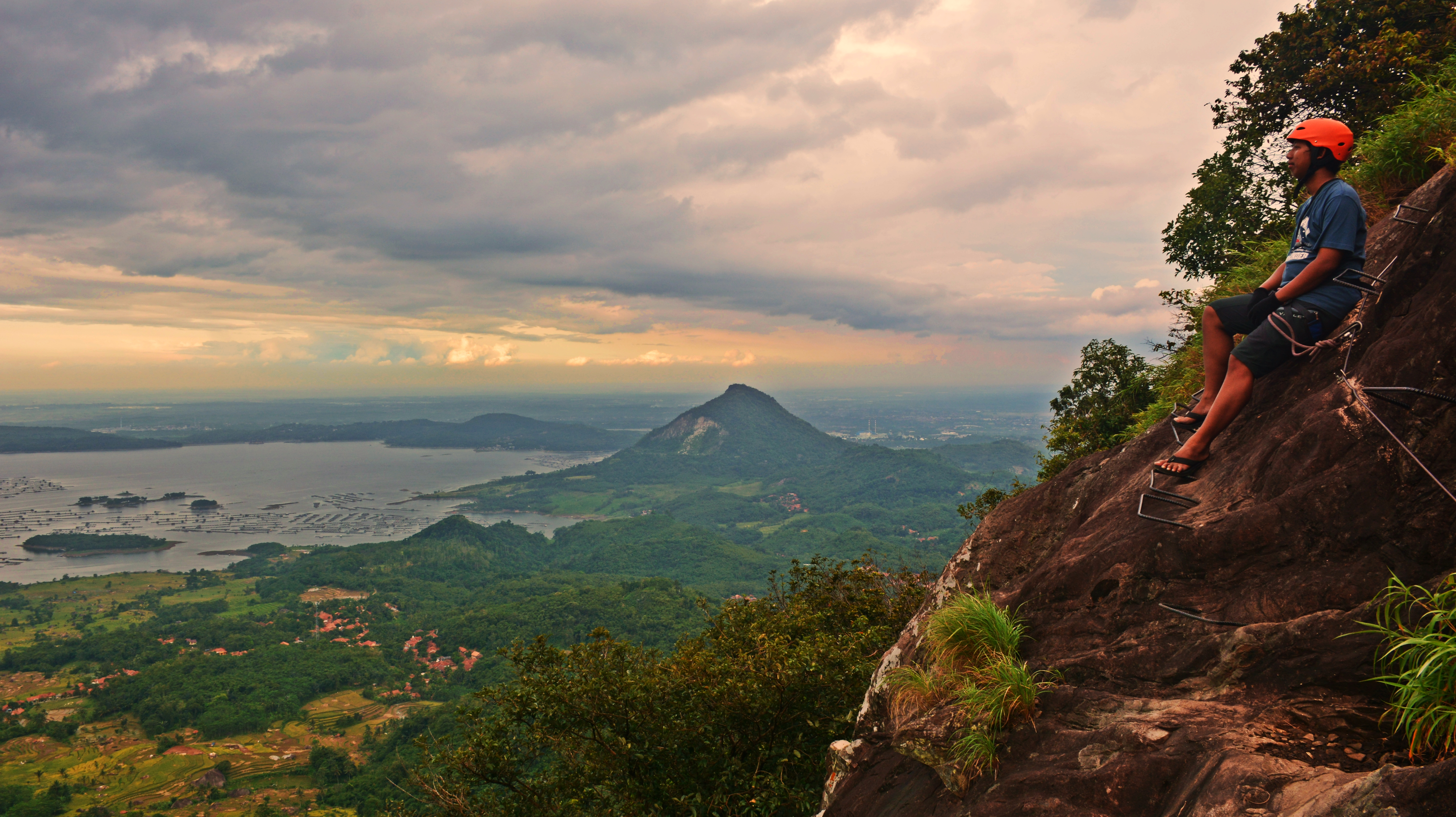
A man enjoys the view from Parang Mountain

Mount Parang or Gunung Parang (gunung-mountain, parang-machete), is a mountain in the Purwakarta Regency of West Java in Indonesia.

Located between the two main arms of the Jatiluhur Reservoir, this andesite mountain of volcanic rock shows three distinct peaks stretching some 1.5 km from north to south, the highest of which is 963m above sea level Its 600m cliffs, offering hard rock and scant holds, make it a popular venue for recreational rock climbers.

== Recreational use ==
Mount Parang is "The Park" or "The Mecca" of rock climbing in Indonesia. This mountain has become well known in the world of Indonesia's rock climbing since 1980, and it is where climbing as a sport started in Indonesia. Any rock climber's list of ascents is regarded as incomplete if he has not tried climbing and creating a new route on Mount Parang, where climbing is different from that of other big walls around the world since one is subjected to extremely hot and humid weather, rain, difficult rock, and a beautiful panoramic view. Mount Parang has three main peaks, better known as Tower 1, Tower 2 and Tower 3, and several other smaller peaks. Various climbing routes are available, but the more popular climbing route is "240" on Tower 2, made by Skygers, a rock climbing group from Bandung. The route "Special Forces" on Tower 3, was put up by the Indonesian Army's Special Forces. Many other climbs in the area are put up by teams from Indonesia and internationally.

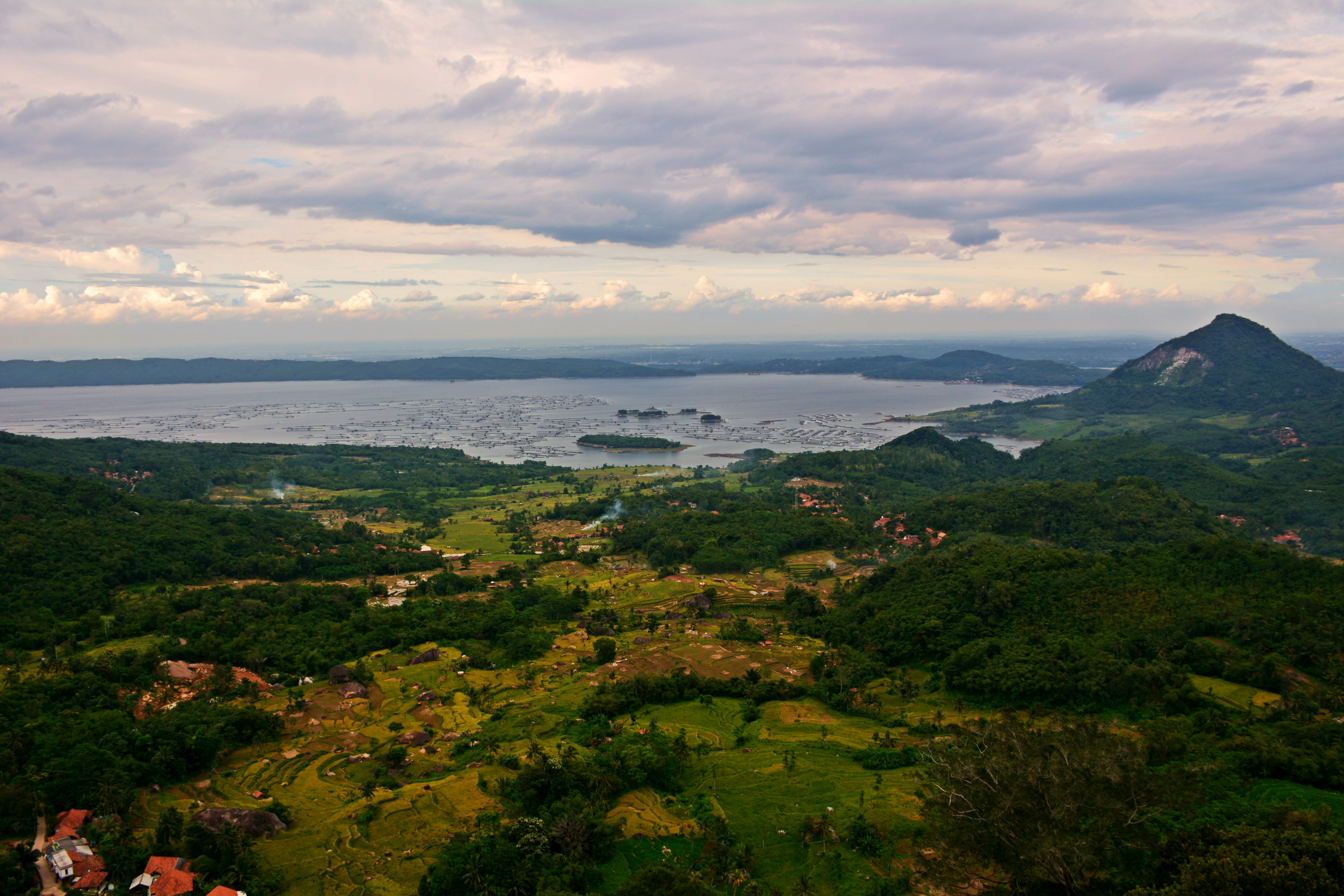
Jati Luhur Reservoir and the surrounding area seen from Parang Mountain

The best climbing season is in the months from June to October, because it rarely rains, and does not interfere with climbing. However, one cannot rule out the possibility of a weather change at any time, and patience is useful here. To climb Mount Parang, physical and mental preparation should be made, as well as the use of proper equipment and skills. Safety considerations should be foremost since emergencies can easily arise on Mount Parang. Mount Parang is managed and monitored by local villagers under the community of Badega Gunung Parang with full support from the authorities of Purwakarta.
