= Igo Etrich =

Austrian aviation pioneer (1879–1967)

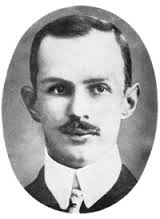
Photo of Igo Etrich

Ignaz "Igo" Etrich (25 December 1879 – 4 February 1967) was an Austrian flight pioneer, pilot and fixed-wing aircraft developer.

== Education ==
Etrich was born on Christmas Day 1879 in the Upper Old Town of Trutnov, Bohemia. He attended school in Leipzig, where he came in contact with the works of Otto Lilienthal. His main interest was in aviation, the problems of bird flight. With his father, a factory-owner, he built a laboratory for developing aeroplanes. After the death of Lilienthal, Etrich's father acquired some advanced gliders.

== Aviation ==
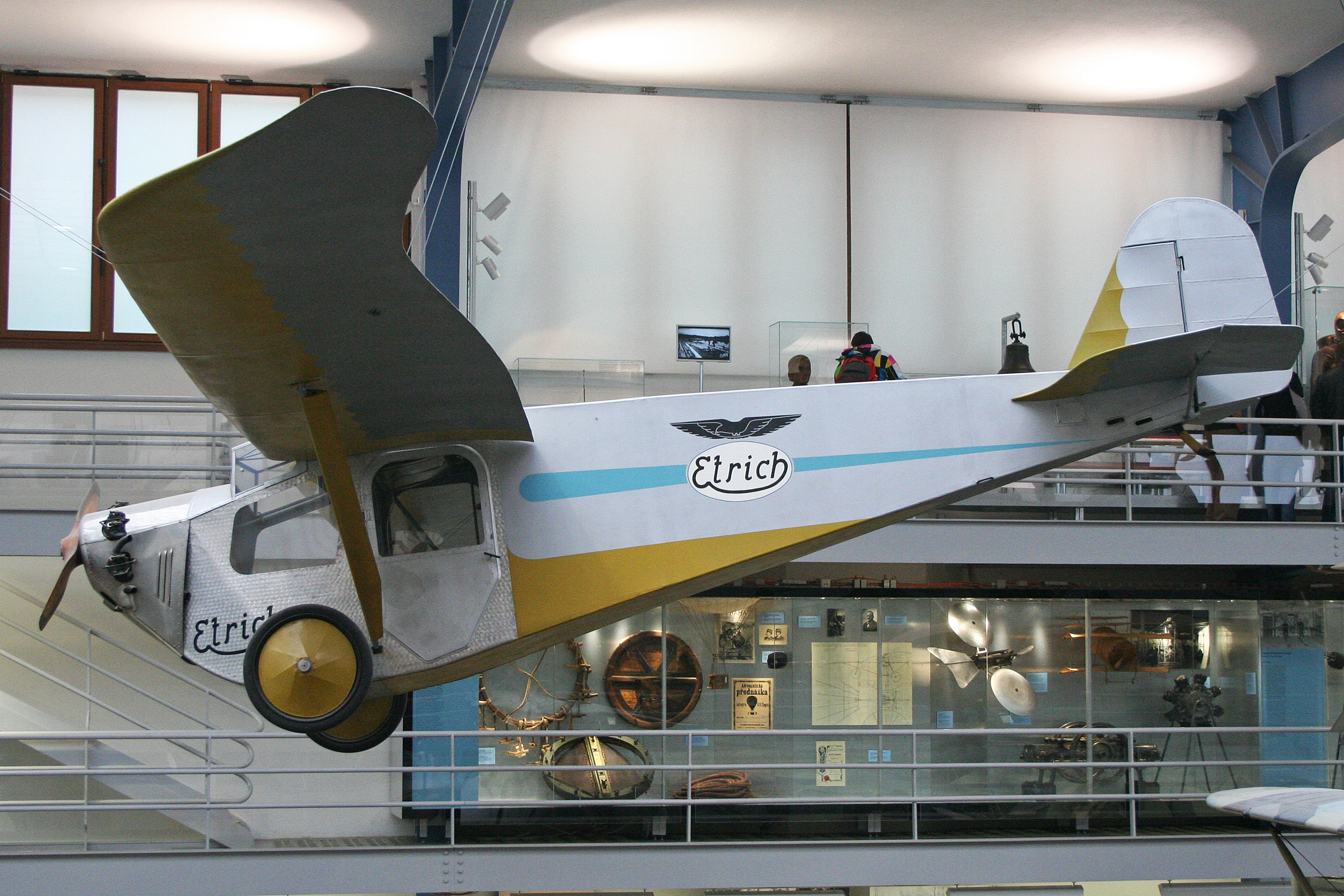
The Etrich Sport-Taube at the National Technical Museum (Prague).

Prof. Ahlborn had published a paper in 1897, in which he had described the flying seed of Zanonia macrocarpa. Etrich and his co-worker Franz Xaver Wels designed an unmanned glider of similar form and flew it successfully in 1904. Attempts to add an engine failed, but a successful manned glider was flown in 1906.

He also worked with Karl Illner.

The next stop was Vienna, where Etrich had his second laboratory in the Wiener Prater at the Rotunde. In 1907, he built his Etrich I, the Praterspatz (Prater park Sparrow) there. Due to its low power (24 hp (18 kW; 24 PS)) of the engine and the limited space for flying, the aircraft was unsuccessful.

In 1909, the first airfield in the Austro-Hungarian Empire was founded in Wiener Neustadt. Etrich rented two hangars and continued to develop his design, the Taube (Dove). Meanwhile, Wels visited Paris to study the aircraft of the Wright brothers and split with Etrich over the question of whether to build a monoplane or biplane.

In 1910, the Etrich II, or Taube, made its maiden flight. In an early flight, Etrich nearly broke his back when it crashed. From then on, Karl Illner made all of Etrich's test flights. Etrich continued to refine the Taube so as to meet the specifications of the military, which included the requirement to be able to land on a freshly plowed field.

In 1912 he founded Etrich Fliegerwerke in Liebau (today Lubawka, Poland) and designed an aircraft with an enclosed cabin for the passengers, which he named Luft-Limousine.

Later he moved to Germany, founding Brandenburgische Flugzeugwerke, which became Hansa-Brandenburg after he sold it to Camillo Castiglioni in 1914. From Liebau, Etrich took his chief designer, Ernst Heinkel, with him.

Another aircraft designer, Edmund Rumpler, modified the design of the Taube slightly, claimed to be the developer and refused to pay licensing fees to Etrich. With the advent of World War I, Etrich made the design for his Taube freely available and dropped his lawsuit.

After World War I, Etrich moved back to his birthplace Trautenau (now Trutnov) in the newly founded Czechoslovakia, and built the Sport-Taube. It was claimed to be faster with its 40 hp engine than the Czechoslovak military planes of the time. The authorities claimed he built the plane for smuggling and impounded his plane. Igo Etrich was so disappointed, that he abandoned his aeronautical projects and dedicated himself to the production of textile machinery.

Etrich died on February 4 1967 in Salzburg, Austria.

== Surviving aircraft ==
- The Etrich II can be seen at the "Technisches Museum" in Vienna, Austria.
- The Etrich Sport-Taube, a closed-cockpit monoplane, and the Wells/Etrich glider are exhibited at the National Technical Museum in Prague.

== Numismatics ==
Austrian Aviation commemorative coin

Igo Etrich was selected as a main motif for a euro collectors' coin, the Austrian Aviation commemorative coin, minted on 28 February 2007. This reverse side of the coin shows the “Etrich-Taube” as well as the “Zanonia” glider and a waving Igo Etrich sitting in the open cockpit of a plane.

== See also ==
- Volksflugzeug
