= Zeidan Cabinet =

Cabinet of Libya selected by Prime Minister Ali Zeidan

- Cabinet of Libya

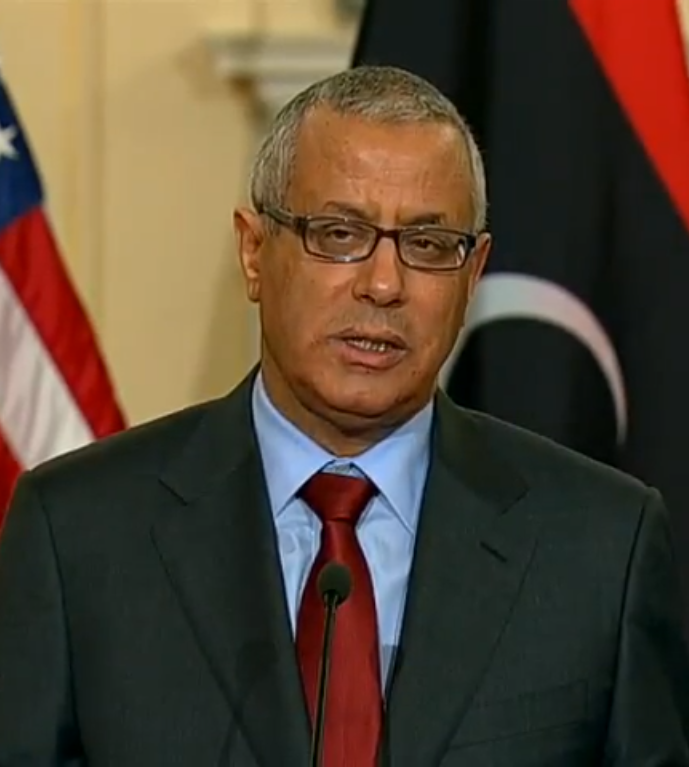
- Date formed: 31 October 2012
- Date dissolved: 11 March 2014

People and organisations
- Head of government: Ali Zeidan

History
- Predecessor: El-Keib Cabinet
- Successor: First Al-Thani Cabinet

The cabinet was selected by Prime Minister Ali Zeidan on 30 October 2012 and was approved by the General National Congress on 31 October 2012 together with approving Zidan as Libya's first post-war Prime Minister. The cabinet is composed of the following ministers: Two women were selected to cabinet, and select ministries (Defence, Foreign Affairs, Finance, Interior and Justice) went to political independents who were not associated with any party.

The Zeidan government was officially inaugurated on 14 November 2012.

The Ministers in charge of electricity [Ali Mohammed Mihirig], higher education [Abdulasalm Bashir Duabi] and relations with congress [Muaz Fathi Al-Kujah] have also been rejected by the integrity commission. The nominee for the minister of higher education (Abdulasalm Bashir Duabi) was ruled unfit to hold public office. Ashour Shuail was cleared by an appeals court and took office on 11 December 2012. Ali Mohammed Mihirig was also cleared by an appeals court.

Four other nominees fates were not decided on by the integrity commission as of 14 November 2012. They were Ali Al-Aujali (Foreign Affairs), Kamla Khamis Al-Mazini (Social Affairs), Ahmed Ayad Ali Al-Urfi (Agriculture) and Abdulsalam Mohammed Abusaad (Religious Affairs and Awqaf). Sami Al-Saadi, who was nominated for the Minister of the Martyrs, resigned on 7 November 2012

Nominees for Foreign Affairs Minister Ali Al-Aujali, Social Affairs Minister Kamla Khamis Al-Mazini and Agriculture Minister Ahmed Ayad Ali Al-Urfi were cleared by the integrity commission. Nominee for Religious Affairs Minister Abdusalam Mohammed Abusaad was still being investigated. Ali Al-Aujali resigned from the cabinet on 31 December 2012.

| Incumbent | Office | Website | Since |
|---|---|---|---|
| Ali Zeidan | Prime Minister of Libya | www.pm.gov.ly | 14 November 2012 |
| Sadiq Abdulkarim Abdulrahman | First Deputy Prime Minister | | |
| Awad al-Baraasi | Second Deputy Prime Minister | | |
| Abdussalam Al Qadi | Third Deputy Prime Minister | | |
| Abdulsalam Mohammed Abusaad | Minister of Religious Affairs | awqaf.gov.ly | |
| Mohamed Imhamid Abdulaziz | Minister for International Cooperation | | |
| Ikram Abdulsalam Imam | Minister of Tourism | www.tourism.gov.ly | |
| Abubaker Al-Hadi Mohammed | Minister of Local Government | www.lgm.gov.ly | |
| Salah Bashir Marghani | Minister of Justice | www.aladel.gov.ly | 14 November 2012 |
| Usama Siala | Minister of Communications and Information Technology | www.cim.gov.ly | |
| Mohamed Fitouri Sualim | Minister of Labor and Retraining | www.labour.gov.ly | |
| Alhadi Suleiman Hinshir | Minister of Water Resources | | |
| Muaz Fathi Al-Kujah | Minister of State GNC affairs | | |
| Ramadan Ali Mansour Zarmuh | Minister of State the Injured | | |
| Nurideen Abdulhamid Dagman | Minister of Health | www.health.gov.ly | |
| Ashour Suleiman Shuwail (December 2012–May 2013); Mohammed Khalifa Al Sheikh (26 May 2013 – new government) | Minister of Interior | www.moi.gov.ly | |
| Mustafa Mohammed Abufunas, vacated January 2014 | Minister of Economy | www.ect.gov.ly | |
| Mohammed Hassan Abubaker | Minister of Education | www.edu.gov.ly | |
| Mohamed Abdelaziz | Minister of Foreign Affairs | www.foreign.gov.ly | |
| Mohammed Mahmoud Al Barghathi (12 November 2012–27 June 2013); Abdullah al-Thanay (5 August 2013 - 8 April 2014) | Minister of Defense | www.defense.gov.ly | |
| Haithem Saed Jalgham | Minister of Planning | www.planning.gov.ly | |
| Kamila Khamis Al-Mazini | Minister of Social Affairs | www.socialaffairs.gov.ly | |
| Abdulbari Al Arusi vacated January 2014 | Minister of Oil | | |
| Haithem Saed Jalgham | Minister of Finance | www.mof.gov.ly | |
| Ahmed Ali Al-Urfi | Minister of Agriculture | www.agriculture.gov.ly | |
| Suleiman Ali Al-Taif Al-Fituri | Minister of Industry | www.industry.gov.ly | |
| Abdulasalm Bashir Duabi | Minister of Scientific Research and Higher Education | www.highereducation.gov.ly | |
| Habib Mohammed Al-Amin | Minister of Culture | www.culture.ly | |
| Ali Mohammed Mihirig, vacated January 2014 | Minister of Electricity | www.merel.gov.ly | |
| Ali Gadour | Minister of the Martyrs | | |
| Ali Hussein Al-Sharif, vacated January 2014 | Minister of Housing | www.mhu.gov.ly | |
| Mohamed Al-Ayib | Minister of Transportation | www.ctt.gov.ly | |
| Mohammed bin Saud | Minister of media | www.media.gov.ly | |
| Abdulsalam Abdullah Guaila, vacated January 2014 | Minister of Sports and Youth | www.youthandsports.gov.ly | |
