= Minister of Defence (Libya) =

Cabinet position in Libya

- وزير الدفاع

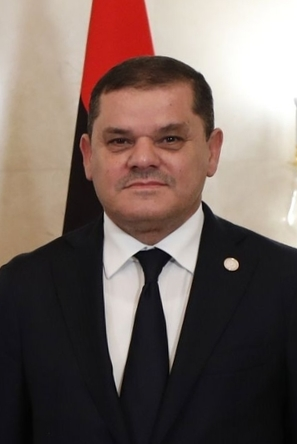
- Incumbent; Abdul Hamid Dbeibeh since 14 March 2021
- Ministry of Defence
- Style: Mr. Minister
- Type: Minister of Defence
- Member of: Cabinet of Libya
- Reports to: Prime Minister
- Seat: Tripoli, Libya
- Term length: No fixed term At the Prime Minister's behest
- Formation: 24 December 1951; 74 years ago
- First holder: Ali Jerbi
- Website: www.defense.gov.ly

The Minister of Defence of Libya (Arabic: وزير الدفاع, romanized: wazir aldifae) is the politically appointed head of the Libyan ministry of defence and is responsible for the Libyan Armed Forces.

== List of ministers ==
=== Kingdom of Libya (1951–1969) ===
No.	Portrait	Name (Birth–Death)	Term			Government	Ref.
No.	Portrait	Name (Birth–Death)	Took office	Left office	Time in office	Government	Ref.
1	Ali Jerbi	Ali Jerbi (1903–1969)	24 December 1951	18 February 1954	2 years, 56 days	al-Muntasir	
2	Khalil Al-Qalal	Khalil Al-Qalal	18 February 1954	19 December 1954	304 days	-	
3	Ibrahim ben Sha'ban	Ibrahim ben Sha'ban	19 December 1954	26 March 1956	1 year, 98 days	Ben Halim	
4	Ali Jawdah	Ali Jawdah	26 March 1956	31 October 1956	219 days	Ben Halim	
5	Abdul Qadir al-Allam	Abdul Qadir al-Allam (1919–2003)	31 October 1956	26 May 1957	207 days	Ben Halim	
6	As-Siddig al-Mutassir	As-Siddig al-Mutassir (1912–1979)	26 May 1957	24 April 1958	333 days	Kabar	
7	Ismail ben Sha'ban	Ismail ben Sha'ban	27 April 1958	17 October 1960	2 years, 173 days	Kabar	
8	Ahmad al-Hasairi	Ahmad al-Hasairi	17 October 1960	4 May 1961	199 days	Essed	
9	Yunis Abd al-Nabi Bilkayr	Yunis Abd al-Nabi Bilkayr	4 May 1961	19 March 1963	1 year, 319 days	Essed	
10	Sayf al-Nasr Abd al-Jalil	Sayf al-Nasr Abd al-Jalil	19 March 1963	29 July 1964	1 year, 132 days	Fikini	
11	Abd al-Salam Bsikri	Abd al-Salam Bsikri	29 July 1964	2 October 1965	1 year, 65 days	al-Muntasir	
12	General Muhammad al-Mansuri	General Muhammad al-Mansuri	2 October 1965	22 March 1966	171 days	Maziq	
13	Abuseif Yasin (al-Mugherbi)	Abuseif Yasin (al-Mugherbi) (1900–1969)	22 March 1966	25 October 1967	1 year, 217 days	Maziq	
14	Hamid Ubaydi	Hamid Ubaydi	25 October 1967	8 September 1969	1 year, 318 days	al-Bakkoush	

=== Libyan Arab Republic (1969–1977) ===
No.	Portrait	Name (Birth–Death)	Term			Government	Ref.
No.	Portrait	Name (Birth–Death)	Took office	Left office	Time in office	Government	Ref.
1	Adam al-Hawaz	Adam al-Hawaz (1939–1984/1988?)	8 September 1969	7 December 1969	2 months	Maghribi	

=== Libyan Arab Jamahiriya (1977–2011) ===
No.	Portrait	Name (Birth–Death)	Term			Government	Ref.
No.	Portrait	Name (Birth–Death)	Took office	Left office	Time in office	Government	Ref.
1	Abu-Bakr Yunis Jabr	Abu-Bakr Yunis Jabr (1940–2011)	16 January 1970	20 October 2011 †	41 years, 9 months	Gaddafi (1970-1972); Jalloud (1972-1977); General People's Committee (1977-2011)	

=== National Transitional Council (2011–2012) ===
No.	Portrait	Name (Birth–Death)	Term			Government	Ref.
No.	Portrait	Name (Birth–Death)	Took office	Left office	Time in office	Government	Ref.
1	Omar El-Hariri	Omar El-Hariri (1944–2015)	23 March 2011	19 May 2011	57 days	–	
2	Jalal al-Digheily	Jalal al-Digheily	19 May 2011	22 November 2011	187 days	–	
3	Osama al-Juwaili	Osama al-Juwaili (born 1961)	22 November 2011	14 November 2012	358 days	El-Keib	

=== General National Congress (2012–2016) ===
No.	Portrait	Name (Birth–Death)	Term			Government	Ref.
No.	Portrait	Name (Birth–Death)	Took office	Left office	Time in office	Government	Ref.
1	Mohammed Mahmoud Al Barghathi	Mohammed Mahmoud Al Barghathi	12 November 2012	27 June 2013	227 days	Zeidan	
2	Abdullah al-Thani	Abdullah al-Thani (born 1954)	5 August 2013	8 April 2014	246 days	Zeidan	-

=== Government of National Accord (2016–2021) ===
No.	Portrait	Name (Birth–Death)	Term			Government	Ref.
No.	Portrait	Name (Birth–Death)	Took office	Left office	Time in office	Government	Ref.
1	Al-Mahdi Al-Barghathi	Al-Mahdi Al-Barghathi (1968–2023)	5 January 2016	29 July 2018	2 years, 244 days	National Accord	
2	Fayez al-Sarraj	Fayez al-Sarraj (born 1960)	6 September 2018	28 August 2020	1 year, 357 days	National Accord	-
3	Salah Eddine al-Namrush	Salah Eddine al-Namrush (born 1975)	28 August 2020	15 March 2021	199 days	National Accord	

=== Government of National Unity (2021–present) ===
No.	Portrait	Name (Birth–Death)	Term			Government	Ref.
No.	Portrait	Name (Birth–Death)	Took office	Left office	Time in office	Government	Ref.
1	Abdul Hamid Dbeibeh	Abdul Hamid Dbeibeh (born 1958)	15 March 2021	Incumbent	5 years, 176 days	National Unity	
