= First Al-Thani Cabinet =

Cabinet of Libya

- Cabinet of Libya
- Date formed: 11 March 2014
- Date dissolved: 29 August 2014

People and organisations
- Head of state: Nouri Abusahmain
- Head of government: Abdullah al-Thani

History
- Predecessor: Zeidan Cabinet
- Successor: Maiteeq Cabinet

The first cabinet of Abdullah al-Thani was in power from 11 March until 29 August 2014, when it resigned so that the newly elected House of Representatives could create a new government.

Incumbent	Office	Website	Since	Until
Abdullah al-Thani	Prime Minister of Libya		11 March 2014	29 August 2014
Sadiq Abdulkarim Abdulrahman	First Deputy Prime Minister			29 August 2014
Awad al-Baraasi	Second Deputy Prime Minister			29 August 2014
Abdussalam Al Qadi	Third Deputy Prime Minister			29 August 2014
Abdulsalam Mohammed Abusaad	Minister of Religious Affairs	awqaf.gov.ly		29 August 2014
Mohamed Imhamid Abdulaziz	Minister for International Cooperation			29 August 2014
Ikram Abdulsalam Imam	Minister of Tourism	www.tourism.gov.ly		29 August 2014
Abubaker Al-Hadi Mohammed	Minister of Local Government	www.lgm.gov.ly		29 August 2014
Salah Marghani	Minister of Justice	www.aladel.gov.ly		29 August 2014
Osama Abdurauf Siala	Minister of Communications and Information Technology	www.cim.gov.ly		29 August 2014
Mohamed Fitouri Sualim	Minister of Labor and Retraining	www.labour.gov.ly		29 August 2014
Alhadi Suleiman Hinshir	Minister of Water Resources			29 August 2014
Muaz Fathi Al-Kujah	Minister of State GNC affairs			29 August 2014
Ramadan Ali Mansour Zarmuh	Minister of State the Injured			29 August 2014
Nurideen Abdulhamid Dagman	Minister of Health	www.health.gov.ly		29 August 2014
unknown	Minister of Interior	www.moi.gov.ly		29 August 2014
Vacant	Minister of Economy	www.ect.gov.ly		
Mohammed Hassan Abubaker	Minister of Education	www.edu.gov.ly		29 August 2014
Mohamed Abdelaziz	Minister of Foreign Affairs	www.foreign.gov.ly		29 August 2014
Vacant	Minister of Defense	www.defense.gov.ly		
Haithem Saed Jalgham	Minister of Planning	www.planning.gov.ly		29 August 2014
Kamila Khamis Al-Mazini	Minister of Social Affairs	www.socialaffairs.gov.ly		29 August 2014
Omar Ali Shakmak (acting)	Minister of Oil			29 August 2014
Haithem Saed Jalgham	Minister of Finance	www.mof.gov.ly		29 August 2014
Ahmed Ali Al-Urfi	Minister of Agriculture	www.agriculture.gov.ly		29 August 2014
Suleiman Ali Al-Taif Al-Fituri	Minister of Industry	www.industry.gov.ly		29 August 2014
Abdulasalm Bashir Duabi	Minister of Scientific Research and Higher Education	www.highereducation.gov.ly		29 August 2014
Habib Mohammed Al-Amin	Minister of Culture	www.culture.ly		29 August 2014
Vacant	Minister of Electricity	www.merel.gov.ly		
Ali Gadour	Minister of the Martyrs			29 August 2014
Vacant	Minister of Housing	www.mhu.gov.ly		
Mohamed Al-Ayib	Minister of Transportation	www.ctt.gov.ly		29 August 2014
Mohammed bin Saud	Minister of media	www.media.gov.ly		29 August 2014
Vacant	Minister of Sports and Youth	www.youthandsports.gov.ly		

== See also ==
- Second Al-Thani Cabinet
