= 2014 Libyan coup attempts =

Attempted coups d'état in Libya

2014 Libyan coup d'état attempts
- Part of the Factional violence in Libya (2011–2014)
| Date | 14 February 2014 (First coup d'état attempt); May 2014 (Second coup d'état attempt) |
| Location | Tripoli, Libya |
| Result | Large scale collapse of government and the beginning of the Second Libyan Civil War |

Belligerents
| (Libya) Libyan Government | Libyan Republican Alliance: Forces Loyal to General Haftar |

Commanders and leaders
| Ali Zeidan (Prime Minister of Libya); Abdullah al-Thani (Prime Minister of Libya) | Maj. Gen. Khalifa Haftar (Commander of Libyan Ground Forces) |

Two coup d'état attempts were reported to have been made in 2014 by forces loyal to Maj. Gen. Khalifa Haftar, the commander of Libyan Ground Forces.

== February ==
Haftar reportedly took control of Libya's main institutions on the morning of 14 February, before announcing on TV that he had suspended the General National Congress, the government and the Constitutional Declaration. Haftar claimed to be working in the name of the Libyan Republican Alliance, and also that forces loyal to him were in Tripoli, although he also stressed that he was not attempting a coup, but "a correction to the path of the revolution."

=== Reaction ===
In spite of the declaration according to the Independent there appeared to be minimal military presence in Tripoli, a claim supported by Reuters. The US ambassador to Libya, Safira Deborah, also released a statement claiming there appeared to be no substance to Haftar's declaration.

Libyan Defence Minister Abdullah Al-Thinni, responding to the declaration, claimed that Haftar's claim to forces loyal to him being in Tripoli was a lie, and also alleged that Haftar had no legitimacy. Thinni also reiterated that there was a warrant out for Haftar's arrest on the grounds of plotting a coup d'état.

Similarly Prime Minister Zeidan announced on public television that "We won't let anyone hijack the Libyan revolution," adding that the Military Command, with help of pro-government militias, has ordered Haftar's arrest.

== May ==
As of 18 May 2014, the parliament building was reported to have been stormed by troops loyal to General Haftar, reportedly including the Zintan Brigade, in what the Libyan government described as an attempted coup.

== See also ==
- 2013 Libyan coup d'état attempt
- 2013 Egyptian coup d'état
