= Mohamed Abdelaziz (Libyan politician) =

Libyan politician (born 1950)

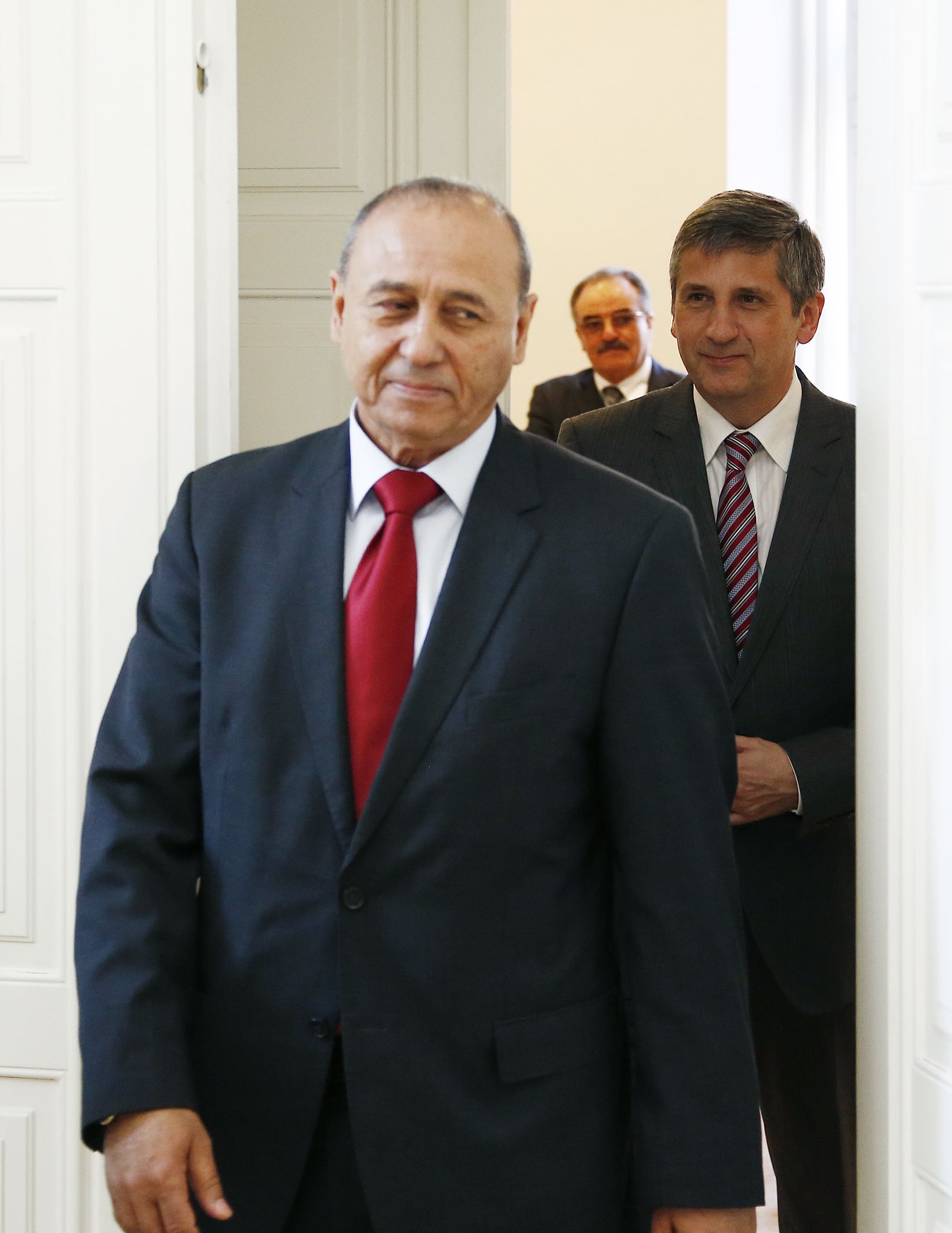

Libyan Ambassador to Egypt
- Incumbent
- Assumed office October 2018
- President: Fayez al-Sarraj; Mohamed al-Menfi
- Prime Minister: Abdul Hamid Dbeibeh

Minister of Foreign Affairs
- In office 7 January 2013 – 29 August 2014
- President: Mohammed Magariaf; Giuma Atigha (Acting); Nouri Abusahmain
- Prime Minister: Ali Zeidan; Abdullah al-Thanay
- Preceded by: Ashour Bin Khayal
- Succeeded by: Mohammed al-Dairi

Personal details
- Born: 1951 or 1952 (age 73–74) Tripoli, Libya
- Party: Independent

Mohamed Abdelaziz is a Libyan politician who served as the foreign minister of and chairman of the Arab League council of ministers from January 2013 to August 2014.

== Early life and education ==
Abdelaziz was born in Tripoli around 1950. He graduated from Cairo University obtaining a degree in political science in 1975.

== Career ==
Abdelaziz was a member of the Libyan mission to the United Nations. Then he worked at the Crime Prevention Centre in Vienna. He served as deputy minister of international cooperation and foreign affairs in the transition government of Libya. On 7 January 2013, Abdelaziz was appointed minister of international cooperation and foreign affairs after these two ministries were remerged. The cabinet was headed by Ali Zidan.

Abdelaziz's term as foreign minister ended when the cabinet resigned on 29 August 2014. He was replaced by Mohammed al-Dairi in the post.

In October 2018 Abdelaziz was appointed ambassador of Libya to Egypt.

=== Views ===
In April 2014 he called for the restoration of the Senussi dynasty and that the constitutional monarchy established by the federalist constitution of 1951 was the "only solution" for "the return of security and stability to Libya".
