= Al-Thani Cabinet =

Al-Thani Cabinet may refer to:

- First Al-Thani Cabinet
- Second Al-Thani Cabinet
