= Mohamed Taha Siala =

Libyan politician

Mohamed Taher Siala
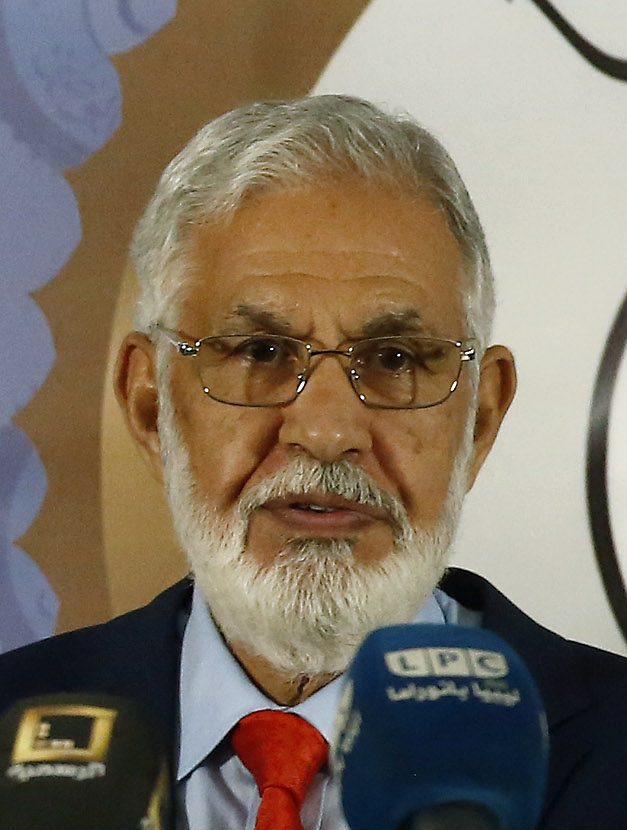

Minister of Foreign Affairs
- In office 14 May 2016 – 15 March 2021
- Prime Minister: Fayez al-Sarraj
- Preceded by: Mohammed al-Dairi
- Succeeded by: Najla Mangoush

Personal details
- Born: May 27, 1943 (age 82)
- *Siala's term is disputed by Mohammed al-Dairi since January 2016.

Mohamed Taher Siala (Arabic: محمد طاهر سيالة; born 27 May 1943) is a Libyan politician who served as the Minister of Foreign Affairs of Libya in the Government of National Accord from 2016 to 2021.

== Foreign minister of Libya ==
Siala was one of the eighteen ministers appointed as part of the internationally-recognized Government of National Accord, in January–February 2016, with the objective of reuniting Libya. Before that he was an official in the pre-2011 government of Libya.

He met with Jens Stoltenberg, the Secretary General of NATO, in June 2016 in Brussels, where they discussed the security situation in Libya and possible military assistance to the GNA. He also met with Federica Mogherini, the European Union's head of foreign affairs, and Didier Reynders, the minister of foreign affairs of Belgium. They discussed issues of security, human trafficking in Libya, and the appointment of a new Libyan ambassador to the EU.

In March 2017, he accompanied the GNA vice premier, Ahmed Maiteeq, to a meeting in Moscow with the Special Representative of the President of Russia for the Middle East and Africa, Mikhail Bogdanov. There they discussed the ongoing Libyan crisis and solutions for resolving the conflict, including the possibility of negotiations between the GNA and the Tobruk-based House of Representatives. This was part of an effort to improve relations between Russia and the Libyan GNA, as currently their rivals, the House of Representatives and Marshal Khalifa Haftar, have close relations with the country.

During a press conference in Algiers on 9 May 2017, Siala named Marshal Haftar as the commander-in-chief of the Libyan army, then clarified that the GNA would give him that position if he recognizes the UN-supported government.

Siala met with a delegation of Estonian members of parliament on 2 November 2017, led by former Estonian foreign minister Keit Pentus-Rosimannus. She stated that a political solution in Libya was important for the EU and Estonia, and also affirmed Estonia's support for Libyan efforts against smuggling of weapons and drugs. In the Libyan foreign minister's opinion, it is necessary for a constitutional referendum as well as elections to be held to determine the country's future. At a summit held in Bolivia on November 24, he met with Iranian Vice President Eshaq Jahangiri, stating that both sides want to deepen Iran–Libya relations.

In early 2018 he met with British Ambassador Frank Baker to discuss reconstruction efforts in Libya.

== See also ==
- List of foreign ministers in 2017
- List of current foreign ministers
