= Libyan protests =

Libyan protests may refer to:

- 2011 Libyan protests - a protest wave in Libya in 2011 that led to the overthrow of de facto leader Muammar Gaddafi
- 2020 Libyan protests - protests in August and September 2020 in cities in the west and east parts of Libya
