= Supreme Judicial Council of Libya =

Judicial body of Libya

The Supreme Judicial Court of Libya is the legal body in Libya responsible for organising the legal system of Libya, in existence since the 2011 Libyan Civil War. The SJC retained its structure as a single national body throughout the conflict despite the political split and in 2019 went through Libya-wide "transparent elections" and a "peaceful transfer of power", according to the United Nations Support Mission in Libya.

== Creation ==
The Supreme Judicial Council (SJC) was defined in Law No. 4 of 2011 following the 2011 Libyan Civil War as a replacement for the Muammar Gaddafi-era High Council of Judicial Bodies that was created in 2006, with the aim of having more independence from other components of the governmental system. In contrast to the High Council of Judicial Bodies, the Minister of Justice was excluded from being either the president or an ordinary member of the Supreme Judicial Council. The International Commission of Jurists (ICJ) judged this change to "significantly [enhance]" the independence of the judiciary. Law No. 4 of 2011 makes an amendment to Law No. 6 of 2006.

== Role and independence ==
The SCJ's role under Law No. 6 of 2006, as amended by Law No. 4 of 2011, covers the organisation of "judicial affairs" and responsibilities in relation to members of judicial bodies. Law No. 14 of 2013 gives the SJC a budget separate from the state budget.

The SJC elects its president and vice-president from among its members.

In 2016, the ICJ made detailed recommendations for strengthening the "[institutional, financial and administrative independence]" of the SJC from the executive branch of government.

== Composition ==
Law No. 6 of 2006 (amended by Law No. 4 of 2011) and Law No. 14 of 2013 together define the composition of the SJC to include the president of the Supreme Court, the Prosecutor General, presidents of seven courts of appeal, and representatives of government departments (ministries) including the Litigation Department, the Public Legal Defence Department, the Law Department, and the Judicial Body Inspection Department.

As of mid-2016, the SJC was a male-only body. A woman was elected as representative of the Benghazi Court of Appeal to the SJC in mid-2016. In 2016, the ICJ made detailed recommendations in recommending that the SJC become more "pluralistic and gender-representative, with a majority of judges elected by their peers."

== Unity during the Libyan civil conflict ==
The SJC aimed to retain its unity as a national body during the continuing political and military Libyan conflict that started in 2014. It met with the head of the Presidential Council and of the Government of National Accord, Fayez al-Sarraj, in July 2016, and as of mid 2017, held regular monthly meetings in Benghazi. In October 2019, the SJC completed a new election of its membership and met in Tripoli. It argued that over five years of conflict in Libya, the SJC had remained independent and unified. United Nations Support Mission in Libya (UNSMIL) described the 2019 SJC elections as "an example of democracy and peaceful transfer of power in Libya ... [that reflects] the independence and professionalism of the judiciary, which is a key institution enhancing the rule of law and human rights in Libya."
