= Usama Siala =

Libyan politician

- اسامة سيالة

Minister of Communications and Information Technology
- In office November 2012 – August 2014
- President: Mohamed Yousef el-Magariaf
- Prime Minister: Ali Zeidan
- Preceded by: Anwar Fituri

President of General Telecommunications and Information Authority
- In office September 2014 – Present
- President: Aguila Salah Issa
- Prime Minister: Abdullah al-Thani

Personal details
- Born: July 14, 1970 (age 56) Tripoli, Libya
- Party: Independent
- Education: Tripoli University
- Cabinet: Ali Zeidan
- Website: https://www.cim.gov.ly

Usama Siala is a Libyan politician who served as the Minister of Communications and Information Technology from January 2013 to August 2014. The cabinet was selected by Prime Minister Ali Zeidan on 30 October 2012 and was approved by the General National Congress on 31 October 2012. Siala's term as Minister of Communications and Information Technology ended when the cabinet resigned on 29 August 2014. He was then reinstated as President of General Telecommunications and Information Authority on 22/09/2014.

== Education ==
Siala graduated from Tripoli University with a b.sc. in telecommunication in 1999.

== Career ==
OCT 2014–present day President of General Telecommunications and Information Authority

NOV 2012–present day Head of General Assembly of LPTIC

OCT 2014–present day Board member of the Libyan Investment Authority board of directors

MAR 2015–present day Libyan African Investment Portfolio Board member of the Libyan African Investment Portfolio board of directors

NOV 2012–OCT 2014 Libyan government Minister of Communications and Informatics

== Views ==
Usama Siala is a strong supporter of privatization of the telecom sector of Libya and would like to see the government decrease its hold on the telecommunications sector and get the private sector more involved. Sami, Mariam (September 9, 2013). "Libya to Offer Third GSM License in Three to Six Months". Bloomberg.
