= Sadiq Abdulkarim Abdulrahman =

Libyan physician and politician

First Deputy Prime Minister of Libya
- In office 14 November 2012 – 29 August 2014
- President: Mohammed Magariaf; Juma Ahmad Atigha (Acting); Nouri Abusahmain
- Prime Minister: Ali Zidan; Abdullah al-Thani
- Preceded by: Himself

Personal details
- Born: 1966 (age 59–60)

Sadiq Abdulkarim Abdulrahman (born 1966) is a Libyan physician and politician who served as first deputy prime minister between 14 November 2012 and 29 August 2014.

== Early life and education ==
Abdulrahman was born around 1966. He received a bachelor's degree in general surgery in 1993. Then he obtained a master's degree in medicine in 2001 and a PhD again in medicine in 2005.

== Career ==
Abdulrahman worked as a physician in public hospitals and private clinics. Then he served as a deputy prime minister in the transitional government of Libya. He was appointed first deputy prime minister on 14 November 2012 to the cabinet headed by Ali Zidan. Abdulrahman also held the portfolio of acting interior minister temporarily. On 29 January 2014 he escaped an assassination attempt unhurt in Tripoli.

Abdulrahman's term as deputy prime minister ended on 29 August 2014.
