= Abdulbari Al Arusi =

Libyan engineer and politician (born 1961)

Minister of Oil and Gas
- In office November 2012 – January 2014
- Prime Minister: Ali Zeidan
- Preceded by: Abdulrahman Ben Yezza
- Succeeded by: Omar Shakmak

Personal details
- Born: 1961 (age 64–65) Zawiya
- Education: Tobruk University; University of Manchester Institute of Science and Technology

Abdulbari Al Arusi (born 1961) is a Libyan engineer and politician who served as oil and gas minister of Libya from 14 November 2012 until 22 January 2014.

== Early life and education ==
Arusi was born in Zawiya in 1961. He obtained a Bachelor of Science degree in chemical engineering from Tobruk University. In 1988, he received a master's degree from University of Manchester Institute of Science and Technology. He also holds a PhD from the same university in engineering and corrosion science, which he received in 1992.

== Career ==
After his graduation, Arusi worked in the Sirte Oil Company in different management positions from September 1992 to June 1998. He was then detained in prison between 1998 and 2006. After being released, he held various executive management positions in many engineering companies, including the one in the United Kingdom. He served as executive manager of Libya's Green Holding Company from the end of 2011 to November 2012.

In November 2012, he was appointed minister of oil and gas to the cabinet headed by prime minister Ali Zeidan. Arusi replaced Abdulrahman Ben Yezza as oil minister. Shortly after his appointment, in December 2012, Arusi announced the establishment of the National Corporation for the Exploration and Production of Oil and Gas, a national oil company based in Tripoli. In February 2013, he reported that a new oil area was found in Ghadames Basin, about 650 km southwest of Tripoli, in the western Libya. Arusi's term ended in January 2014 and Omar Shakmak was appointed acting oil minister.

=== Gaddafi era ===
Arusi and his family members experienced several critical events during the era of Muammar Gaddafi. In June 1998, he was detained and sentenced on the grounds that he was allegedly a member of the underground Muslim Brotherhood movement. He spent eight years of a life-sentence in Abu Salim prison. He was released in April 2006. His father also spent some time in Abu Salim in the early 1970s. One of his brothers was killed in Zawiya during the Libyan Civil War. In addition, another brother was fatally beaten and lost an eye during the uprising. Arusi's son Abdulrahman was also jailed for a month in July 2011.

=== Membership ===
Arusi is a member of the American Association of Corrosion Engineers and a member of the British Institute of Corrosion.

Political offices
Preceded by Abdulrahman Ben Yazza	Oil and Gas Minister of Libya; 2012 – 2014	Succeeded by Omar Shakmak
