= Salah Marghani =

Libyan politician

Minister of Justice
- In office November 2012 – 29 August 2014
- Prime Minister: Ali Zeidan; Abdullah al Thinni

Personal details
- Education: Benghazi University

Salah Bashir Marghani is a Libyan jurist, and the former justice minister in the post-civil war government of Libya. He was part of Prime Minister Ali Zeidan's initial cabinet and took office on 14 November 2012.

== Education ==
Marghani received a bachelor's degree in law from Benghazi University in 1972. Then he obtained a master's degree in philosophy of law from a British university in 1979.

== Career ==
Marghani served at the prosecution office during the reign of Muammar Ghaddafi. He also worked as a consultant at the law department of the ministry of justice. In November 2012, he was appointed justice minister to the cabinet headed by Prime Minister Ali Zeidan. In March 2014, when Ali Zeidan fled the country, Marghani remained as justice minister under caretaker Prime Minister, Abdullah al Thinni. Marghani's term ended on 29 August 2014.

=== Controversy ===
On 31 March 2013, armed gunmen stormed ministry of justice and threw Marghani and his staff out of the building due to their objections to Marghani's statements made during an interview with Libya AhrarTV. In the interview, Marghani expressed his concerns over illegal detentions and the prisons run by armed militias.

== Awards ==
In 2012, Marghani was recognised for his work defending human rights in Libya by Human Rights Watch and was awarded the Alison Des Forges Award. However, he could not accept the award due to his appointment as justice minister.
