= Abdussalam Al Qadi =

Third Deputy Prime Minister of Libya
- In office November 2012 – 29 August 2014
- Prime Minister: Ali Zeidan

Personal details
- Education: Sebha University

Abdussalam Al Qadi is a Libyan politician who served as the third deputy prime minister between November 2012 and 29 August 2014.

== Education ==
Qadi received a bachelor's degree in science from Sebha University. Then he obtained a master's degree in olive oil extraction technology from Spain.

== Career ==
Qadi worked in the sectors of agriculture and industry as a manager. In November 2012, Qadi was appointed by Prime Minister Ali Zeidan as the third deputy prime minister. Qadi's term ended on 29 August 2014 when the cabinet resigned.
