= 2026 Libyan protests =

2026 protests in Libya over power cuts

2026 Libyan Protests
- Part of Libyan Crisis
- Date: 25 July - 2 Oct 2026
- Location: Libya
- Caused by: Power cuts in Libya; Extreme heat; Libyan Crisis
- Methods: Political demonstration and protests
- Status: unresolved

The 2026 Libyan Protests or June 2026 Tripoli Protests are a series of protests in June 2026 in the Libyan capital city of Tripoli due to blackouts and power cuts that are happening in various Libyan cities, most noticeably in Tripoli.

These protests have erupted due to the rising heatwaves and electricity cuts in the countries. Heatwaves have reached 40-50 degrees Celsius (104-122 degrees Fahrenheit) in some parts of Libya despite electricity cutting out in various Libyan cities, majorly Tripoli, causing widespread protests. The demonstrators have called for anti-corruption measures in the government and restructuring of the current system. The protests include various movement groups in Libya like the Souq Al Jumma Movement. Protesters also claim to have shut down various state institutions. The protests have also spread to various other cities like Misrata and Zawiya.

== Protestor actions ==
The stated goal of many protest groups so far has been the disruption of government activities. Protestors have blocked or restricted access to government buildings, shown when videos circulated online of protestors welding shut the entrances of twelve different government buildings. Activists have also welded shut the gate to a house in the Noflyeen area of Tripoli that they claimed belonged to Libyan Prime Minister Abdul Hamid Dbeibeh and dumped a truckload of dirt in the entrance of the Ministry of Foreign Affairs.

== See also ==
- Libyan Crisis
- 2020 Libyan protests
