= Ashour Suleiman Shuwail =

Minister of Interior
- In office December 2012 – May 2013
- Prime Minister: Ali Zeidan
- Preceded by: Fawzi Abdel A'al
- Succeeded by: Mohammed Khalifa Al Sheikh

Personal details
- Born: 1954 (age 71–72) Benghazi
- Education: Benghazi University; Ain Shams University

Ashour Suleiman Shuwail (Arabic: عاشور شوايل; born 1954) is a retired Libyan security officer who served as the minister of interior in the cabinet that was formed after the first democratic elections in July 2012.

== Early life and education ==
Shuwail's family is from Benghazi. He was born there in 1954.

Shuwail received a master's degree in law from Benghazi University in 1995 and a PhD in law from Ain Shams University in Egypt in 2000.

== Career ==
Shuwail worked in the Libyan police forces. In October 2012, Shuwail was nominated for minister of interior by prime minister Ali Zeidan. However, the High Commission for the Application of Standards of Integrity and Patriotism that evaluated the suitability of nominees declared that four nominees, including Shuwail, did not endorsed him as interior minister. However, at the beginning of December 2012, he won the case against the verdict of the commission and was officially appointed as minister.

On 21 May 2013, Shuwail resigned from office for "personal reasons". Mohammed Khalifa Al Sheikh replaced him in the post on 26 May 2013 after the Libyan congress approved him.
