= Second Al-Thani Cabinet =

Government of Libya, 2014–2021

- Cabinet of Libya
- Date formed: 29 September 2014
- Date dissolved: 15 March 2021

People and organisations
- Head of state: Aguila Saleh Issa
- Head of government: Abdullah al-Thani

History
- Predecessor: Maiteeq Cabinet
- Successor: Government of National Unity (merged with Government of National Accord) de facto Government of National Stability

The Second Cabinet of Abdullah Al-Thani was approved on 22 September 2014 by Libya's democratically elected House of Representatives. The Libyan Supreme Court ruled on 6 November 2014 that the cabinet was "unconstitutional". Prime Minister al-Thani and his government offered their resignation on 13 September 2020 in response to the 2020 Libyan protests. In the context of the Libyan Civil War, the Second Al-Thani cabinet was generally referred to as the Tobruk government. The Second al-Thani cabinet continued as a rival government to the internationally recognised Government of National Accord between December 2015 and March 2021.

== Composition ==
Incumbent	Office	Website	Since	Until
Abdullah al-Thani	Prime Minister of Libya			
Al-Mahdi Hassan Muftah Allabad	First Deputy Prime Minister and Head of Security Affairs			
Abd al-Salam al-Badri	Second Deputy Prime Minister and Head of Public Services (Electricity, Water etc)			
Abd Al-Rahman Al-Taher	Third Deputy Prime Minister and Head of Authorities (Agriculture etc)			
Mustafa T. A. Abotaeta	Fourth Deputy Prime Minister and Head of Authorities (Defense, Interior, etc)			
Muhammed Al-Farooq Abd al-Salam	Minister of Local Government	www.lgm.gov.ly		
Khalifa F. K. Abuhisha	Minister of Internal Cooperation			
Hisham M. B. Belhaj	Minister of Housing and Utilities			
Al-Mabrouk Ghraira Omran	Minister of Justice	www.aladel.gov.ly		
Reda Al-Menshawi	Minister of Health	www.health.gov.ly		
Umar al-Sinki	Minister of Interior	www.moi.gov.ly		
Fatthi Al-Majbri	Minister of Education and Higher Education	www.edu.gov.ly		
Mohamed al-Dairi	Minister of Foreign Affairs	www.foreign.gov.ly		
Vacant	Minister of Defense	www.defense.gov.ly		
Kamal Al-Hassi	Minister of Finance & Planning	www.planning.gov.ly		
Massoud Ahmed Belqasem Sawa	Minister of Social Affairs	www.socialaffairs.gov.ly		
Muneer Ali Assr	Minister of Economy & Industry	www.industry.gov.ly		

== See also ==
- First Al-Thani Cabinet
