= National Party for Development and Welfare =

Political party in Libya

National Party For Development and Welfare الحزب الوطني للتنمية والرفاه
- Leader: Ali Zeidan
- Founded: 2012; 14 years ago
- Ideology: Liberalism
- Seats in the General National Congress: 1 / 200

The National Party for Development and Welfare (Arabic: الحزب الوطني للتنمية والرفاه) is a minor political party in Libya, represented in the General National Congress. It was founded in 2012 by then Prime Minister Ali Zeidan.
