= Maiteeq Cabinet =

Ahmed Maiteeq Cabinet
- Cabinet of Libya
- Date formed: 25 May 2014
- Date dissolved: 9 June 2014

People and organisations
- Head of state: Nouri Abusahmain
- Head of government: Ahmed Maiteeq

History
- Predecessor: First Al-Thani Cabinet
- Successor: Second Al-Thani Cabinet

The cabinet of prime minister Ahmed Maiteeq was confirmed on 25 May 2014. 83 of the 94 MPs present voted to confirm the cabinet. Four cabinet positions remained unfilled. The election of the prime minister was declared illegal on 9 June 2014 by the Libyan Supreme Court.

== Maiteeq government ==
Incumbent	Office	Since
Ahmed Maiteeq	Prime Minister of Libya	
Abdul Karim Mohammed Al-Arida	First Deputy Prime Minister	
Khalifa Saleh Ibdeewi	Second Deputy Prime Minister	
Saleh Mohamed Al-Aqta	Minister of Communications and Information Technology	
Fayez Mustafa Al-Serraj	Minister of Housing and Utilities	
Khalid Osman Al-Fadil	Minister of Media	
Fathi Amar Wanis	Minister of Economy	
Abdullah Ali Al-Agili	Minister of Awqaf and Islamic Affairs	
Essam Abdullatif Gurba	Minister for International Cooperation	
Fawzia Baryon	Minister of Education	
Said Sulaiman Mayuf	Minister of Higher Education	
Turkiya Abdul Hafid Alwar	Minister of Culture	
Abdulbari Mustafa Shinbaru	Minister of Local Government	
Al-Arif Saleh Al-Khoja	Minister of Interior	
Mohamed Abdul Ali Al-Obeidi	Minister of Agriculture	
Abdul Salam Abdullah Ghwiyla	Minister of Youth and Sport	
Adel Hasan Al-Maheeshi	Minister of State the Injured	
Intessar Mubarak Al-Ageeli	Minister of Social Affairs and Displaced Peoples	
Omar Abdul Al-Khaliq	Minister of Justice	
Mohammed Al-Fitori Swalim	Minister of Labor and Retraining	
Milud Ahmed Khalifa Hamid	Minister of Finance	
Abdulgader Mohammed Al-Ayeb	Minister of Transportation	
Vacant	Minister of Foreign Affairs	
Vacant	Minister of Defense	
Vacant	Minister of Planning	
Vacant	Minister of Oil	
