= Mohammed al-Dairi =

Libyan politician

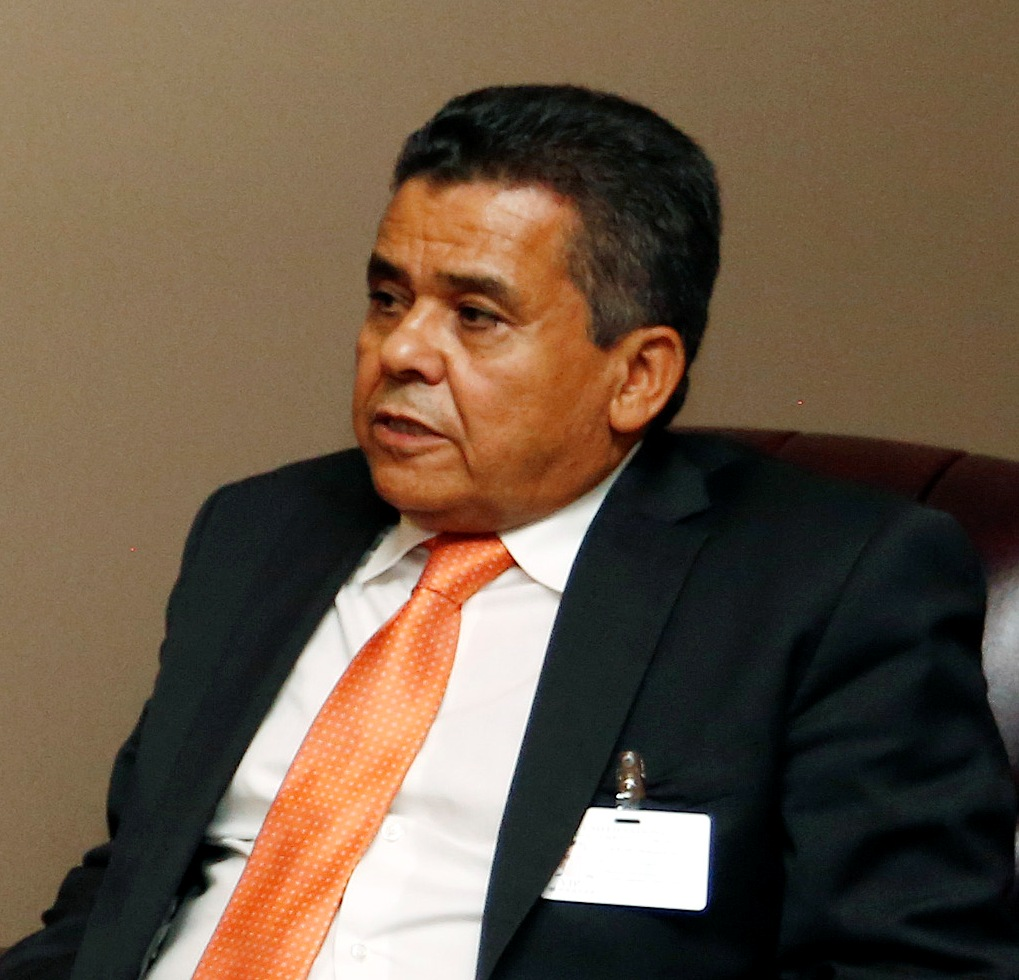

Minister of Foreign Affairs
- In office 28 September 2014* – 28 February 2019*
- Prime Minister: Abdullah al-Thanay
- Preceded by: Mohamed Abdelaziz
- Succeeded by: Abdulhadi Elhweg

Personal details
- Born: March 7, 1952 (age 74)
- Party: Independent
- *al-Dairi's term was disputed by Mohamed Taha Siala since January 2016.

Mohammed al-Dairi or Mohammed ad-Dairi (Arabic: محمد الدايري) (born 7 March 1952) is a Libyan politician. He was the foreign minister of Libya from the Tobruk-based House of Representatives since 28 September 2014 until 28 February 2019.

He graduated in law faculty at the University of Grenoble, and got a master's degree in law from the same university. He is a diplomat since.

He has worked in several diplomatic missions, including appointing a diplomatic attaché to the mission of the League of Arab States accredited to the United Nations in Geneva.

== See also ==
- List of foreign ministers in 2017
- List of current foreign ministers
