= Ahmed Maiteeq =

Libyan businessman and politician (born 1972)

Ahmed Omar Maiteeq
- أحمد عمر معيتيق
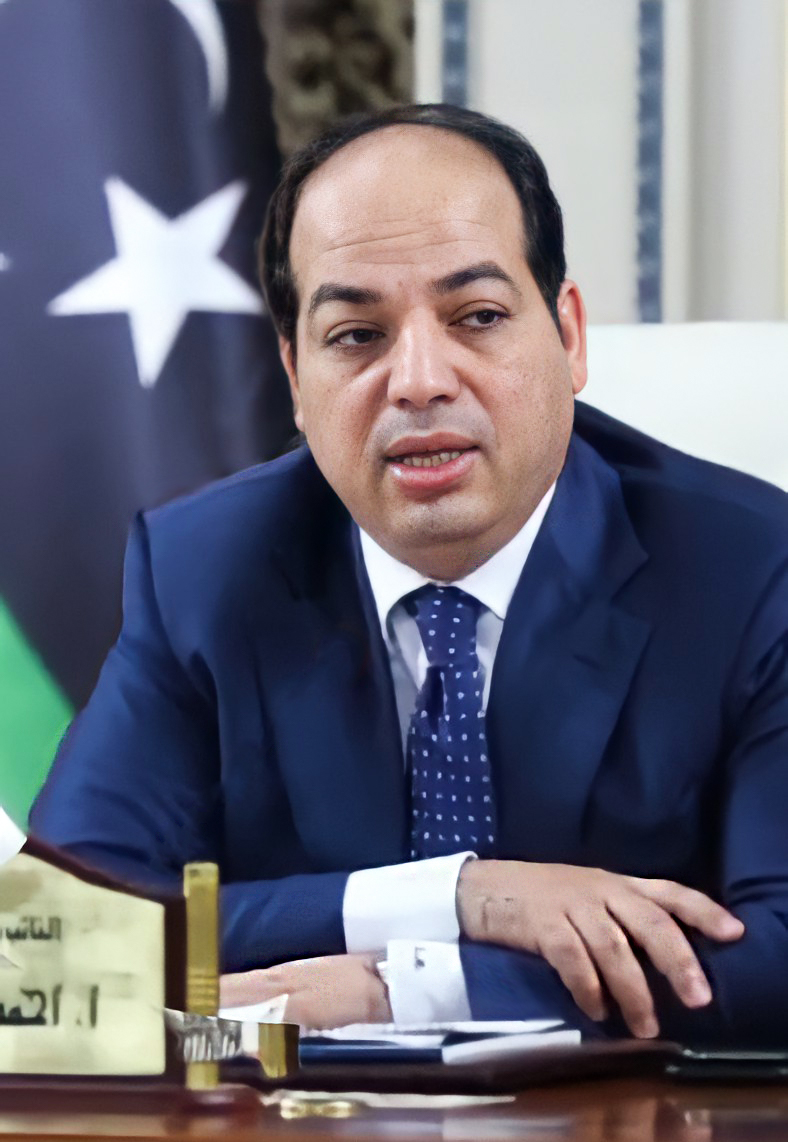
- Maiteeq in 2020

Vice Chairman of the Presidential Council of Libya
- In office 30 March 2016 – 15 March 2021
- President: Fayez al-Sarraj
- Preceded by: Imhemed Shaib & Ahmed Huma (Deputy Presidents of the House of Representatives)
- Succeeded by: Musa Al-Koni

Deputy Head of Government of Libya
- As Vice Chairman of the Presidential Council
- In office 5 April 2016 – 15 March 2021
- President: Fayez al-Sarraj
- Succeeded by: Hussein Al-Qatrani

Prime Minister of Libya
- In office 25 May 2014 – 9 June 2014*
- President: Nouri Abusahmain
- Preceded by: Abdullah al-Theni
- Succeeded by: Abdullah al-Theni

Personal details
- Born: Ahmed Omar Maiteeq; 1972 (age 53–54) Misrata, Libyan Arab Republic
- Party: Independent
- *Maiteeq's premiership was disputed by Abdullah al-Theni.

Ahmed Omar Maiteeq (Arabic: أحمد عمر معيتيق; born 1972) is a Libyan businessman and politician known for his contributions to Libya’s economic and political landscape. He has held various high-ranking positions, including Prime Minister of Libya from May to June 2014 as well as Vice Chairman of the Presidential Council and Deputy Prime Minister of the Government of National Accord from 2016 to 2021.

== Early life and education ==
Maiteeq was born in Misrata in 1972 and raised in Tripoli. After completing his education in Italy, Maiteeq returned to Libya to manage his family's businesses.

== Political career ==
Maiteeq entered politics during the Libyan civil war (2011), joining the Civil Development and Stability Committee. By 2013, he became an economic advisor to the General National Congress (GNC) and was briefly elected Prime Minister of Libya in 2014. Following a legal dispute, he resigned after the Supreme Court invalidated his appointment. In a statement, he said "I respect the judiciary and I will be the first who complies with the judiciary’s rulings."

In March 2016, Maiteeq was appointed as deputy prime minister and vice chairman of the Presidential Council under the Government of National Accord (GNA), established through the UN-backed Libyan Political Agreement. He played a role in economic reforms and diplomatic negotiations, including brokering a ceasefire between the GNA and Marshal Khalifa Haftar in June 2020.

Maiteeq coordinated security strategies against ISIS (2016–2017). He launched an economic reform program in 2018 to improve living standards and stabilize the Libyan dinar. He negotiated an agreement in September 2020 that ended a nine-month oil blockade. He also promoted military unification efforts between Libya’s eastern and western factions.

Maiteeq announced his candidacy for the Libyan presidency in 2021, advocating for inclusive governance, economic stability, and national unity.

== See also ==
- Maiteeq Cabinet
- Timeline of the Libyan civil war (2014–2020)

Political offices
Preceded by Abdullah al-Thani	Prime Minister of Libya; 2014	Succeeded by Abdullah al-Thani
