= 2020 Libyan protests =

Protests in Libya in 2020

- Part of 2018–2022 Arab protests
- Date: 23 August 2020 – 20 October 2020 (1 month, 3 weeks and 6 days)
- Location: Libya
- Caused by: Libyan civil war (2014–2020); Poverty and power cuts; Rising costs and poor living conditions; Unemployment; Government mishandling of the COVID-19 pandemic
- Goals: Resignation of Field Marshal Khalifa Haftar; Resignation of President Fayez al-Sarraj; Fresh elections
- Methods: Demonstrations, Riots
- Result: Protests suppressed by force; Government resignation but rescinded; Killings of demonstrators; Calling for presidential elections

The 2020 Libyan protests consisted of street protests over issues of poor provision of services in several cities in Libya, including cities controlled by the Government of National Accord (GNA) in the west (Tripoli, Misrata, Zawiya) and by the Libyan National Army (LNA) in the east (Benghazi) and south (Sabha) of Libya.

== August 2020 ==
On 23 and 24 August 2020, protests took place in Tripoli, Misrata and Zawiya over issues of power and water cuts, lack of fuel and cooking gas, cash shortages, poor security, and the COVID-19 pandemic.

Armed forces associated with the GNA shot at the demonstrators, causing injuries. The Interior Ministry stated that demonstrators had the right to peacefully protest and that the ministry had opened criminal investigations into the shootings. The Tripoli Protection Force also declared its support for the right of citizens to carry out street protests. The United Nations Support Mission in Libya (UNSMIL) also called for an investigation. Interior Minister Fathi Bashagha criticised the gunmen, stating that live ammunition was used "indiscriminately", and that the gunmen had kidnapped demonstrators and "[sowed] panic among the population and [threatened] security and public order".

Prime Minister Fayez al-Sarraj responded to the protests with a long speech, with the suspension of Interior Minister Fathi Bashagha, and with a Cabinet reshuffle. Salah Eddine al-Namrush became Defence Minister and Mohammad Ali al-Haddad, from Misrata, became the head of the army.

== September 2020 ==
Protests over "living conditions and power cuts" took place in Benghazi on 11 September 2020, including tyre burning and road blocks. Protests continued in Benghazi on 12 and 13 September, and started in Bayda, Sabha and Marj. Benghazi protestors set fire to a building used as headquarters by the LNA-associated authorities. The de facto LNA-associated government led by Abdullah al-Thani offered its resignation on 13 September 2020 in response to the protests.

On 13 September, two hundred protestors demonstrated in Tripoli in front of the Presidential Council against poor living conditions and calling for elections and political reform. Speakers at the protest objected to the appointment of Mohammed Bayou as head of a state-supported media organisation, claiming that he supported Khalifa Haftar.

On 16 September, Fayez al-Sarraj, head and prime minister of the Government of National Accord, stated that he would resign from his position by the end of October 2020.

Protests continued on 21 September in Benghazi by the Residents of the City of Benghazi calling for democracy and opposing corruption and on 24 September in Sug Juma, Tripoli and Zliten against cuts in electric power. The Benghazi protestors were attacked by Haftar supporters and one organiser went missing. The 24 September protests included road blocks and tyre burning.

A protest in Gharyan on 23 September called for the Gharyan municipal elections to be held.

== October 2020 ==
A protest in Sabha on 16 October criticised Haftar for poor living conditions in Sabha and the southern region in general, citing control of fuel supplies, growth of the black market and the shutdown of Sabha Airport.

Protests and strikes were seen as widespread and nationwide with riots being held and the country seen at risk of a revolution by unknown commentators. Between 19 and 20 October, protests and riots against the government and the shortages on the nation occurred with no police involved but then, riot police took control of the protests in Tobruk and clashing with protesters in Benghazi. Peaceful demonstrations occurred throughout Libya between 22 and 27 October and led to shootings and quelling. Anti-France and a two-day anti-government movement was held in Tripoli.

Strikes against power cuts saw hundreds attend on 29–30 October. It was met with tear gas and plastic bullets and riots was met with rubber bullets. Riots occurred on 29 October by workers and ended violently with clashes. The general strikes were the worse since August. Benghazi and Sirte was the areas that experienced the unrest, according to local Libyan media.

On 31 October 2020, Fayez al-Sarraj rescinded his decision to resign.

== Deaths and injuries ==
The riots and protests in Libya made the United Nations and Amnesty International express "grave concern". The rival government to Khalifa Haftar resigned but on 31 October, refused and did not accept the resignation. At least four deaths, according to CNN, were committed and blood was also seen by witnesses on the streets of Benghazi. Thirteen injuries were reported in October alone by Libyan media and the opposition.

== Naming of revolt, slogans and fears of a revolution ==
Revolution was being shouted on the streets of Misrata as police entered the critical stage of the protests. Amnesty International and the US and the European Union condemned the protests and considered protesters to stay calm. Fears of a revolution was sparked by the slogan "Thawra Liban Libia", meaning revolution in Libya, Libya and "Allahu Akbar" was heard during gunfire in clashes in early September. The protests were described numerously by international media and the Western world as "uprising against presidents Haftar and Al Sarraj" or the "revolt of victory" after the resignation of the eastern-backed government. Another popular slogan throughout the south of Libya which was heard after poor living conditions protests was Ash-shab yurid isqat an-nizam, referring to the popular slogan of the Arab summer and Arab spring.

== See also ==
- 2022 Tripoli clashes
- 2026 Libyan protests
- Libyan peace process
