= El-Keib Cabinet =

The El-Keib Cabinet formed the interim executive government of Libya from 2011 to 2012. Following the removal of Gaddafi, an interim cabinet, sometimes called the Transitional Executive Board, composed of the following ministers, was sworn in on 4 December 2011. and functioned as a caretaker government until the 2012 elections and the installation of Ali Zeidan's government.

Incumbent	Office	Website	Since
Abdurrahim El-Keib	Prime Minister of Libya	www.pm.gov.ly	24 November 2011
Mustafa A.G. Abushagur	Deputy Prime Minister		22 November 2011
Hamza Abu Faris	Minister of Awqaf & Islamic Affairs		
Ali Ashour	Minister of Justice	www.aladel.gov.ly	
Anwar Fituri	Minister of Communications and Information Technology	www.cim.gov.ly	
Mustafa Rugibani	Minister of Labor		
Fatima Hamroush	Minister of Health	www.health.gov.ly	
Fawzi Abdel A'al	Minister of Interior	www.moi.gov.ly	
Awad Beroin	Minister of Energy		
Taher Sharkasi	Minister of Trade and Commerce	www.ect.gov.ly	
Sulaiman al-Sahli	Minister of Education	www.edu.gov.ly	23 March 2011
Ashour Bin Khayal	Minister of Foreign Affairs	www.foreign.gov.ly	
Col. Osama al-Juwali	Minister of Defense	www.defense.gov.ly	
Isa Tuwaijri	Minister of Planning	www.planning.gov.ly	
Mabrouka Jibril	Minister of Social Affairs	www.socialaffairs.gov.ly	
Abdulrahman Ben Yezza	Minister of Oil		
Hasan Zaglam	Minister of Finance	www.mof.gov.ly	
Abdul-Hamid Sulaiman BuFruja	Minister of Agriculture	www.agriculture.gov.ly	
Mahmoud Fetais	Minister of Industry	www.industry.gov.ly	
Dr. Naeem Gheriany	Minister of Scientific Research and Higher Education	www.highereducation.gov.ly	
Ahmed Attiga	Minister of Investment		
Abdul Rahman Habil	Minister of Culture and Civil Society	www.culture.ly	
Awad al-Baraasi	Minister of Electricity		
Ashraf bin Ismail	Minister of the Martyrs		
Mohammad Hadi Hashemi Harari	Minister of Local Government		
Ibrahim Alsagoatri	Minister of Housing		
Yousef el-Uheshi	Minister of Transportation	www.ctt.gov.ly	
Fathi Terbil	Minister of Youth	www.youthandsports.gov.ly	
Ibrahim Eskutri	Minister of Construction		
Senussi Kwideer	Advisor to the Prime Minister and Director of Projects Management at the PM's office	http://www.pm.gov.ly/news/item/963-%D9%85%D8%AF%D9%8A%D8%B1-%D8%A5%D8%AF%D8%A7%D8%B1%D8%A9-%D8%A7%D9%84%D9%85%D8%B4%D8%B1%D9%88%D8%B9%D8%A7%D8%AA-%D9%88%D8%A7%D9%84%D8%AE%D8%AF%D9%85%D8%A7%D8%AA-%D8%A8%D8%AF%D9%8A%D9%88%D8%A7%D9%86-%D8%B1%D8%A6%D8%A7%D8%B3%D8%A9-%D8%A7%D9%84%D9%88%D8%B2%D8%B1%D8%A7%D8%A1-%D9%8A%D9%86%D9%81%D9%8A-%D8%B5%D8%AD%D8%A9-%D9%85%D8%A7-%D8%AA%D9%85-%D8%AA%D8%AF%D8%A7%D9%88%D9%84%D9%87-%D8%A8%D8%B4%D8%A3%D9%86-%D9%85%D8%B7%D8%A7%D8%B1-%D8%A8%D9%86%D9%8A%D9%86%D8%A7-%D8%A7%D9%84%D8%AF%D9%88%D9%84%D9%8A.html	
