= Fawzi Abdel A'al =

Prosecutor and a Libyan politician (born 1971)

Fawzi Abdel A'al فوزي عبدالعال

Interior Minister
- In office 22 November 2011 – 26 August 2012
- Prime Minister: Abdurrahim El-Keib
- Preceded by: Nassr al-Mabrouk Abdullah
- Succeeded by: Ashour Suleiman Shuwail

Personal details
- Born: 1971 (age 54–55) Misrata, Libya
- Party: Independent
- Education: University of Garyounis (B.A.); Institute of Higher Education (M.A.)
- Profession: Prosecutor

Fawzi Abdel A'al (Arabic: فوزي عبدالعال; born 1971) is a prosecutor and a Libyan politician born in the city of Misrata in 1971. He was named Interior Minister on 22 November 2011 by Abdurrahim El-Keib. Prior to the 2011 Libyan civil war Fawzi worked as a prosecutor at the Misratta Central Court. Fawzi lost one of his brothers during the 2011 civil war. On 26 August 2012, he resigned from his post due to criticisms against him concerning the attacks on Sufi Muslim shrines and other violent events that occurred in Libya.
