= Awad al-Baraasi =

Libyan politician

Awad Al-Baraasi عوض البرعصي

Second Deputy Prime Minister of Libya Acting
- In office 14 November 2012 – 4 August 2013
- President: Mohamed Yousef el-Magariaf
- Prime Minister: Ali Zeidan
- Preceded by: Mustafa A.G. Abushagur

Personal details
- Born: 28 June 1966 (age 60) Benghazi, Libya
- Party: Justice and Construction Party
- Education: University of Benghazi (B.A.); University of Waterloo (M.A.); University of British Columbia (PhD)
- Profession: Electrical Engineering; Politician

Awad Ibraik Ibrahim Al-Baraasi (Arabic: عوض ابريك ابراهيم البرعصي; born 28 June 1966) is a professor in Electrical Engineering and Libyan politician.

== Biography ==
Baraasi was born in the city of Benghazi on 28 June 1966. He was named electricity and renewable energy minister on 22 November 2011 by Abdurrahim El-Keib.

He served as the vice president of the Dubai Electricity and Water Authority before returning to Libya during the revolution. He briefly acted as the deputy prime minister from 4 November 2012 to 4 August 2013.
