= List of heads of government of Libya =

Prime Minister of the State of Libya
- رئيس وزراء دولة ليبيا
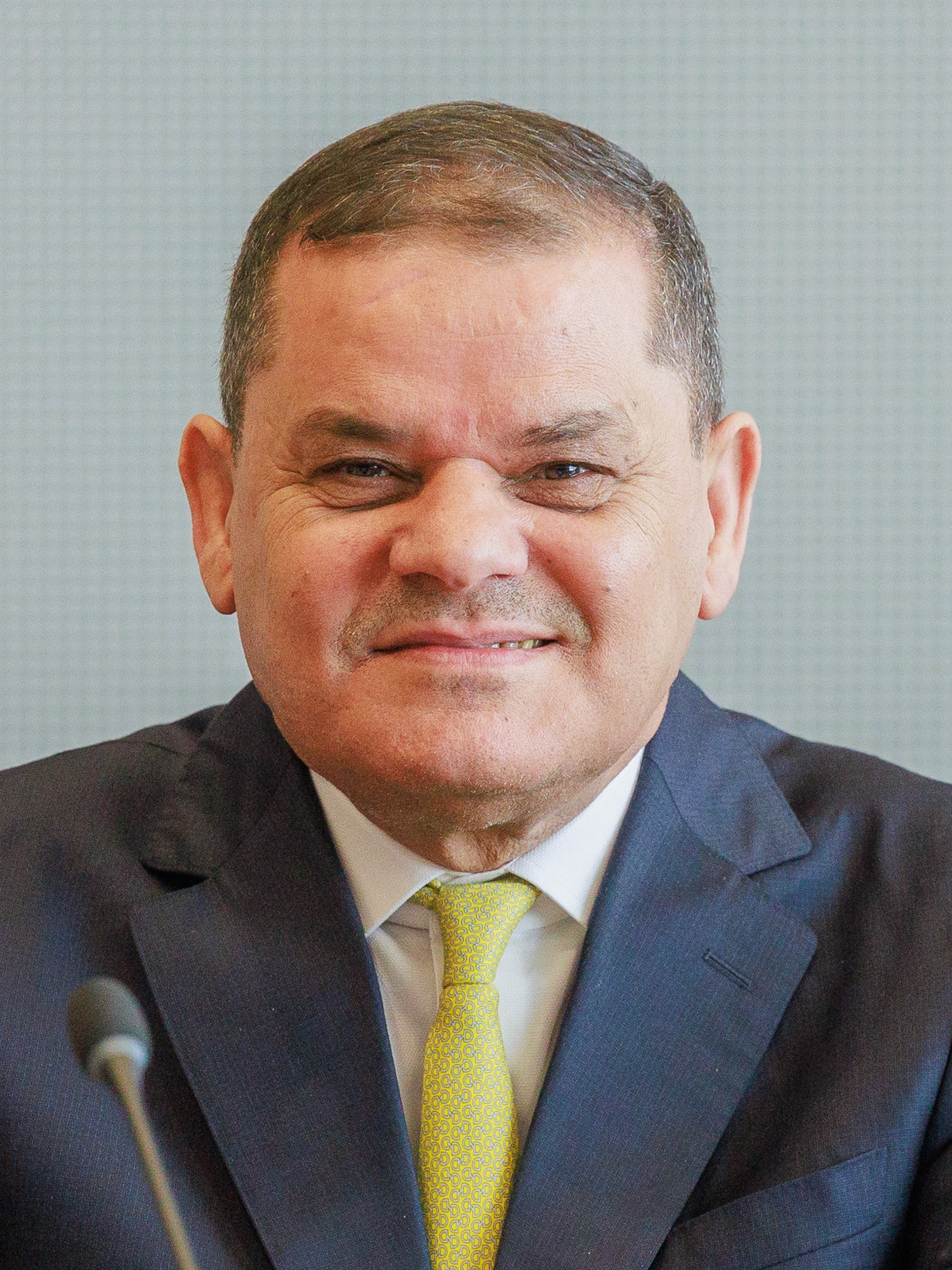
- Incumbent; Abdul Hamid Dbeibeh (Note: Disputed with Osama Hammad, head of the Government of National Stability, who is recognized by the House of Representatives as the acting Prime Minister of Libya.) since 15 March 2021
- Government of National Unity
- Style: Mr. Prime Minister; His Excellency
- Status: Head of government
- Member of: Cabinet of Libya
- Reports to: Chairman of the Presidential Council
- Seat: Tripoli, Libya
- Formation: 29 March 1951; 75 years ago
- First holder: Mahmud al-Muntasir
- Deputy: Deputy Prime Minister

This article lists the heads of government of Libya since the country's independence in 1951.

Libya has been in a tumultuous state since the start of the Arab Spring-related Libyan crisis in 2011; the crisis resulted in the collapse of the Libyan Arab Jamahiriya and the killing of Muammar Gaddafi, amidst the First Civil War and the foreign military intervention. The crisis was deepened by the factional violence in the aftermath of the First Civil War, resulting in the outbreak of the Second Civil War in 2014. The control over the country is currently split between the internationally recognized Government of National Unity (GNU) in Tripoli and the rival Government of National Stability (GNS)—supported by the House of Representatives (HoR)—in Tobruk, their respective supporters, as well as various jihadist groups and tribal elements controlling parts of the country.

== Heads of government of Libya (1951–present) ==
=== Kingdom of Libya (1951–1969) ===
No.	Name	Portrait	Lifespan	Term of office			Political affiliation
No.	Name	Portrait	Lifespan	Took office	Left office	Time in office	Political affiliation
1	Mahmud al-Muntasir		1903–1970	29 March 1951	19 February 1954	2 years, 327 days	Independent
1	Mahmud al-Muntasir		1903–1970	Prime Minister. First tenure in the office. Served in acting capacity until 24 December 1951.			
2	Muhammad Sakizli		1892–1976	19 February 1954	12 April 1954	52 days	Independent
2	Muhammad Sakizli		1892–1976	Prime Minister.			
3	Mustafa Ben Halim		1921–2021	12 April 1954	26 May 1957	3 years, 44 days	Independent
3	Mustafa Ben Halim		1921–2021	Prime Minister.			
4	Abdul Majid Kabar		1909–1988	26 May 1957	17 October 1960	3 years, 144 days	Independent
4	Abdul Majid Kabar		1909–1988	Prime Minister.			
5	Muhammad Osman Said		1924–2007	17 October 1960	19 March 1963	2 years, 153 days	Independent
5	Muhammad Osman Said		1924–2007	Prime Minister.			
6	Mohieddin Fikini		1925–1994	19 March 1963	20 January 1964	307 days	Independent
6	Mohieddin Fikini		1925–1994	Prime Minister.			
(1)	Mahmud al-Muntasir		1903–1970	20 January 1964	20 March 1965	1 year, 59 days	Independent
(1)	Mahmud al-Muntasir		1903–1970	Prime Minister. Second tenure in the office.			
7	Hussein Maziq		1918–2006	20 March 1965	2 July 1967	2 years, 104 days	Independent
7	Hussein Maziq		1918–2006	Prime Minister.			
8	Abdul Qadir al-Badri		1921–2003	2 July 1967	25 October 1967	115 days	Independent
8	Abdul Qadir al-Badri		1921–2003	Prime Minister.			
9	Abdul Hamid al-Bakkoush		1933–2007	25 October 1967	4 September 1968	315 days	Independent
9	Abdul Hamid al-Bakkoush		1933–2007	Prime Minister.			
10	Wanis al-Qaddafi		1922–1986	4 September 1968	31 August 1969	361 days	Independent
10	Wanis al-Qaddafi		1922–1986	Prime Minister. Deposed in the 1969 revolution.			
=== Libya under Gaddafi (1969–2011) === ==== Libyan Arab Republic (1969–1977) ====
11	Mahmud Suleiman Maghribi		1935–2009	8 September 1969	16 January 1970	130 days	Independent
11	Mahmud Suleiman Maghribi		1935–2009	Prime Minister.			
12	Muammar Gaddafi		1942–2011	16 January 1970	16 July 1972	2 years, 182 days	Military / Arab Socialist Union
12	Muammar Gaddafi		1942–2011	Prime Minister. Simultaneously served as the Chairman of the Revolutionary Command Council (RCC).			
13	Abdessalam Jalloud		born 1944	16 July 1972	2 March 1977	4 years, 229 days	Military / Arab Socialist Union
13	Abdessalam Jalloud		born 1944	Prime Minister.			
==== Libyan Arab Jamahiriya (1977–2011) ====
14	Abdul Ati al-Obeidi		1939–2023	2 March 1977	2 March 1979	2 years	Independent (Islamic socialist)
14	Abdul Ati al-Obeidi		1939–2023	Secretary-General of the General People's Committee (GPCO). Afterwards served as Secretary-General of the General People's Congress (head of state), from 1979 to 1981.			
15	Jadallah Azzuz at-Talhi		1939–2024	2 March 1979	16 February 1984	4 years, 351 days	Independent (Islamic socialist)
15	Jadallah Azzuz at-Talhi		1939–2024	Secretary-General of the GPCO. First tenure in the office.			
16	Muhammad az-Zaruq Rajab		born 1940	16 February 1984	3 March 1986	2 years, 15 days	Independent (Islamic socialist)
16	Muhammad az-Zaruq Rajab		born 1940	Secretary-General of the GPCO. Previously served as Secretary-General of the General People's Congress (head of state), from 1981 to 1984. Afterwards served as Governor of the Central Bank of Libya, from 1987 to 1990 and in 2011.			
(15)	Jadallah Azzuz at-Talhi		1939–2024	3 March 1986	1 March 1987	363 days	Independent (Islamic socialist)
(15)	Jadallah Azzuz at-Talhi		1939–2024	Secretary-General of the GPCO. Second tenure in the office. Served at the time of the 1986 United States bombing (Operation El Dorado Canyon).			
17	Umar Mustafa Al Muntasir		1939–2001	1 March 1987	7 October 1990	3 years, 220 days	Independent (Islamic socialist)
17	Umar Mustafa Al Muntasir		1939–2001	Secretary-General of the GPCO.			
18	Abuzed Omar Dorda		1944–2022	7 October 1990	29 January 1994	3 years, 114 days	Independent (Islamic socialist)
18	Abuzed Omar Dorda		1944–2022	Secretary-General of the GPCO. Afterwards served as head of the Mukhabarat el-Jamahiriya (national intelligence service), from 2009 to 2011.			
19	Abdul Majid al-Qa′ud		1943–2021	29 January 1994	29 December 1997	3 years, 334 days	Independent (Islamic socialist)
19	Abdul Majid al-Qa′ud		1943–2021	Secretary-General of the GPCO.			
20	Muhammad Ahmad al-Mangoush		1937–2016	29 December 1997	1 March 2000	2 years, 63 days	Independent (Islamic socialist)
20	Muhammad Ahmad al-Mangoush		1937–2016	Secretary-General of the GPCO.			
21	Imbarek Shamekh		born 1952	1 March 2000	14 June 2003	3 years, 105 days	Independent (Islamic socialist)
21	Imbarek Shamekh		born 1952	Secretary-General of the GPCO. Afterwards served as Secretary-General of the General People's Congress (head of state), from 2009 to 2010.			
22	Shukri Ghanem		1942–2012	14 June 2003	5 March 2006	2 years, 264 days	Independent (Islamic socialist)
22	Shukri Ghanem		1942–2012	Secretary-General of the GPCO.			
23	Baghdadi Mahmudi		born 1945	5 March 2006	23 August 2011	5 years, 171 days	Independent (Islamic socialist)
23	Baghdadi Mahmudi		born 1945	Secretary-General of the GPCO. Served at the time of the First Civil War and the concurrent foreign military intervention. Deposed during the Battle of Tripoli.			
=== Transitional period (2011–present) ===
24	Mahmoud Jibril		1952–2020	5 March 2011	23 October 2011	232 days	Independent
24	Mahmoud Jibril		1952–2020	Prime Minister; served as Head of the Executive Team of the National Transitional Council (NTC) until 23 March 2011. In rebellion to 23 August 2011, based in Benghazi during this period.			
—	Ali Tarhouni		born 1951	23 October 2011	24 November 2011	32 days	Independent
—	Ali Tarhouni		born 1951	Deputy Prime Minister, assumed office as caretaker.			
—	Abdurrahim El-Keib		1950–2020	24 November 2011	14 November 2012	356 days	Independent
—	Abdurrahim El-Keib		1950–2020	Acting Prime Minister.			
25	Ali Zeidan		born 1950	14 November 2012	11 March 2014	1 year, 117 days	National Party for Development and Welfare
25	Ali Zeidan		born 1950	Prime Minister. Briefly kidnapped by armed militants during the 2013 coup attempt. Survived the February 2014 coup attempt.			
Following the 2014 parliamentary election, the government was split between the newly-elected House of Representatives (HoR) and the outgoing General National Congress (GNC), resulting in the Second Civil War. The 2014 elections were declared invalid by the Supreme Court in November 2014.
26	Abdullah al-Theni		born 1954	11 March 2014	5 April 2016	2 years, 25 days	Independent
26	Abdullah al-Theni		born 1954	Prime Minister. In rebellion, based in Tobruk from August 2014, then in Bayda. Internationally recognized until 12 March 2016. Served in acting capacity until 8 April 2014. Survived the May 2014 coup attempt.			
—	Ahmed Maiteeq		born 1972	25 May 2014	9 June 2014	15 days	Independent
—	Ahmed Maiteeq		born 1972	Prime Minister. Appointment declared invalid by the Supreme Court.			
—	Omar al-Hassi		born 1949	6 September 2014	31 March 2015	206 days	Independent
—	Omar al-Hassi		born 1949	Prime Minister of the National Salvation Government (NSG). In rebellion, based in Tripoli.			
—	Khalifa al-Ghawil		born 1964	31 March 2015	5 April 2016	1 year, 5 days	Independent
—	Khalifa al-Ghawil		born 1964	Prime Minister of the NSG. Served in acting capacity until 1 December 2015. In rebellion, based in Tripoli.			
Following the inauguration of the Presidential Council and the Government of National Accord (GNA), the government remain split between the HoR and the NSG, recreated after the 2016 coup attempt. However, the High Council of State (HCS), based in Tripoli, recognized the GNA.
27	Fayez al-Sarraj		born 1960	5 April 2016	15 March 2021	4 years, 306 days	Independent
27	Fayez al-Sarraj		born 1960	Prime Minister of the GNA, simultaneously served as the Chairman of the Presidential Council. Internationally recognized, based in Tripoli.			
—	Khalifa al-Ghawil		born 1964	14 October 2016	16 March 2017	153 days	Independent
—	Khalifa al-Ghawil		born 1964	Prime Minister of the recreated NSG. In rebellion, based in part of Tripoli.			
—	Abdullah al-Theni		born 1954	5 April 2016	15 March 2021	4 years, 344 days	Independent
—	Abdullah al-Theni		born 1954	Prime Minister of the HoR. Based in opposition in Tobruk.			
28	Abdul Hamid Dbeibeh		born 1958	15 March 2021	Incumbent	5 years, 179 days	Independent
28	Abdul Hamid Dbeibeh		born 1958	Prime Minister of the Government of National Unity (GNU). Internationally recognized, based in Tripoli.			
—	Fathi Bashagha		born 1962	3 March 2022	16 May 2023	1 year, 74 days	Independent
—	Fathi Bashagha		born 1962	Prime Minister of the Government of National Stability (GNS), supported by the HoR. Based in opposition in Sirte. Suspended by the HoR on 16 May 2023.			
—	Osama Hammad		born 1979	16 May 2023	Incumbent	3 years, 117 days	Independent
—	Osama Hammad		born 1979	Acting Prime Minister of the GNS, supported by the HoR. Designated Acting Prime Minister by the HoR after the suspension of Fathi Bashagha.			

== See also ==
- List of governors-general of Italian Libya
- List of heads of state of Libya
- Brotherly Leader and Guide of the Revolution
