= Cabinet of Libya =

Executive body of the Libyan government

The Cabinet of Libya serves as the leadership for the executive branch of the government of Libya.

== Ministers ==
Abdul Hamid Dbeibeh was selected as Prime Minister of Libya in the Libyan Political Dialogue Forum on 5 February 2021 and a list of cabinet appointees was released on 11 March 2021. The Dbeibeh Cabinet replaced the rival al-Sarraj and al-Thani cabinets.

In March 2022, Minister of Civil Service, Abdul Fattah Saleh Muhammad Al-Khawja, and the Minister of State for Immigration Affairs, Ijdid Maatouk Jadeed, resigned after the House of Representatives granted confidence to and sworn-in the rival Government of National Stability led by Fathi Bashagha.

Incumbent	Office	Website	Since	Arab Name
Abdul Hamid Dbeibeh	Prime Minister of Libya	www.pm.gov.ly	15 March 2021	عبد الحميد الدبيبة
Abdul Hamid Dbeibeh	Minister of Defense	www.defense.gov.ly	15 March 2021	عبد الحميد الدبيبة
Hussein Atiya Abdul Hafeez Al-Qatrani	Deputy Prime Minister for East Libya		15 March 2021	
Ramadan Boujenah	Deputy Prime Minister for South Libya		15 March 2021	رمضان بوجناح
Ramadan Boujenah	Minister of Health		9 December 2022	رمضان بوجناح
Ali Al-Zinati	Minister of Health		15 March 2021 to 9 December 2022	
Khaled Al-Mabrouk Abdullah	Minister of Finance	www.mof.gov.ly Archived 5 February 2006 at the Wayback Machine	15 March 2021	
Najla Mangoush	Minister of Foreign Affairs	www.foreign.gov.ly	15 March 2021 to 28 August 2023	
Fathallah al-Zani	Minister of Foreign Affairs	www.foreign.gov.ly	28 August 2023 (acting)	
Fathallah al-Zani	Minister of Youth		15 March 2021	
Khaled Mazen	Minister of Interior	www.moi.gov.ly Archived 20 May 2014 at the Wayback Machine	15 March 2021 to 22 July 2022	
Bashir Al-Amin	Minister of Interior	www.moi.gov.ly Archived 20 May 2014 at the Wayback Machine	22 July 2022 to 6 November 2022 (acting)	
Emad Trabelsi	Minister of Interior	www.moi.gov.ly Archived 20 May 2014 at the Wayback Machine	6 November 2022	
Halima Ibrahim Abdel Rahman	Minister of Justice	www.aladel.gov.ly	15 March 2021	
Musa Muhammad al-Maqrif	Minister of Education	www.edu.gov.ly	15 March 2021	
Imran Muhammad Abdul Anabi Al-Qeeb	Minister of Higher Education and Scientific Research	www.edu.gov.ly	15 March 2021	
Saeed Sifaw	Minister of Technical and Vocational Education	www.edu.gov.ly	15 March 2021	
Kamel Braik Al-Hassi	Minister of Planning	www.planning.gov.ly	15 March 2021	
Wafaa Abu Bakr Muhammad al-Kilani	Minister of Social Affairs	www.socialaffairs.gov.ly	15 March 2021	
Omar Ali Al-Ajili	Minister of Economy & Trade		15 March 2021	
Ahmed Ali Muhammad Omar	Minister of Industry and Minerals	www.industry.gov.ly Archived 13 August 2006 at the Wayback Machine	15 March 2021	
Abdul Fattah Saleh Muhammad Al-Khawja	Minister of Civil Service		15 March 2021	
Badr Al-Din Al-Sadiq Al-Toumi	Minister of Local Government		15 March 2021	
Muhammad Ahmad Muhammad Aoun	Minister of Oil and Gas		15 March 2021	
Ali Al-Abed Al-Reda Abu Azoum	Minister of Labour	www.labour.gov.ly	15 March 2021	
Hamad Abdul-Razzaq Taher Al-Marimi	Minister of Agriculture		15 March 2021	
Mabrouka Othman Oki	Minister of Culture and Knowledge Development		15 March 2021	
Tariq Abdel Salam Mustafa Abu Flika	Minister of Financial Resources		15 March 2021	
Tawfiq Saeed Moftah Al-Dorsi	Minister of Livestock and Marine Resources		15 March 2021	
Abdul Shafi Hussein Muhammad Al-Juifi	Minister of Sports		15 March 2021	
Abd Al-Salam Abdullah Al-Lahi-Tiki	Minister of Tourism and Handicrafts		15 March 2021	
Ibrahim Al-Arabi Mounir	Minister of Environment		15 March 2021	
Zuhair Ahmed Mahmoud	Minister of Housing and Construction		15 March 2021	
Muhammad Salem Al-Shahoubi	Minister of Transportation		15 March 2021	
Houria Khalifa Miloud	Minister of State for Women's Affairs		15 March 2021	
Salama Ibrahim Al-Ghwail	Minister of State for Economic Affairs		15 March 2021	
Ahmed Faraj Mahjoub Abu Khuzam	Minister of State for Displaced Affairs and Human Rights		15 March 2021	
Walid Ammar Muhammad Ammar Al-Lafi	Minister of State for Communication and Political Affairs		15 March 2021	
Ijdid Maatouk Jadeed	Minister of State for Immigration Affairs		15 March 2021	
Adel Jumaa Amer	Minister of State for Prime Minister and Cabinet Affairs		15 March 2021	

== Previous cabinets ==
- General People's Committee (1977–2011)
- El-Keib Cabinet (December 2011–October 2012)
- Zeidan Cabinet (November 2012–March 2014)
- First Al-Thani Cabinet (March 2014–August 2014)
- Miitig Cabinet (May 2014–June 2014)
- Second Al-Thani Cabinet (September 2014 - December 2015) (continued as a rival government until March 2021)
- Al-Sarraj Cabinet (December 2015 – March 2021)
