= Fayez al-Sarraj =

Libyan politician and architect

His Excellency Fayez al-Sarraj
- فايز السراج
- Al-Sarraj in 2016

Chairman of the Presidential Council of Libya (Note: Government of National Accord)
- In office 30 March 2016 – 15 March 2021
- Prime Minister: Himself
- Vice President: Ahmed Maiteeq
- Preceded by: Nouri Abusahmain (Note: as President of the General National Congress); Aguila Saleh Issa (Note: as Speaker of the House of Representatives, internationally recognized)
- Succeeded by: Mohamed al-Menfi (Note: under the Government of National Unity)
- 27th Prime Minister of Libya (Note: as Chairman of the Presidential Council under Government of National Accord)
- In office 5 April 2016 – 15 March 2021**
- President: Himself
- Deputy: Ahmed Maiteeq
- Preceded by: Abdullah al-Theni; Khalifa al-Ghawil (as Prime Minister of Libya)
- Succeeded by: Abdul Hamid Dbeibeh (as Prime Minister of Libya)
Ministerial offices
Minister of Defense
In office 6 September 2018 – 29 August 2020
President	Himself
Preceded by	Al-Mahdi Al-Barghathi
Succeeded by	Salah Eddine al-Namrouch
Minister of Housing and Utilities
In office 25 May 2014 – 9 June 2014
Prime Minister	Ahmed Maiteeq
Preceded by	Ali Al-Sharif
Succeeded by	Zuhair Mahmoud

Personal details
- Born: Fayez Mustafa al-Sarraj; 20 February 1960 (age 66) Tripoli, Kingdom of Libya
- Citizenship: Libya
- Party: Independent
- Spouses: Fatima Al-Tarhuni (m. 1985; div. 1995); Samera Trabelsi (m. 1998; div. 2003); Nadia Refaat (m. 2005)
- Education: University of Tripoli
- Sarraj's position as head of state was disputed by Aguila Saleh Issa. **Sarraj's premiership was disputed by Abdullah al-Theni and Khalifa al-Ghawil.

Fayez Mustafa al-Sarraj ( Arabic: فائز السراج or فايز السراج; born 20 February 1960) is a Libyan politician who served as the Chairman of the Presidential Council of Libya and head of government of the Government of National Accord, which was formed on 17 December 2015 under the Libyan Political Agreement, from 2016 to 2021. He has been a member of the Parliament of Tripoli.

== Biography ==
Fayez Mustafa was born on 20 February 1960 in Tripoli. He comes from a wealthy family of Kouloughli descent which owned shops and vast amount of land. Al-Sarraj is said to be of Turkish origin. His father, Mostafa al-Sarraj was a minister during the Libyan monarchy. Fayez al-Sarraj trained as an architect, and during the Colonel Muammar Gaddafi era he was employed at the Housing Ministry. In 2014, he served as the minister of housing and utilities in the Maiteeq Cabinet of the GNC. His opponents criticized his political appointment as a foreign imposition. A 2016 article in The Guardian quoted Guma el-Gamaty, a member of Libya Dialogue, the UN-chaired body that created the new government, as saying that al-Sarraj was "expected to ask for help to combat ISIS and train Libyan units."

Following Libya's 2014 elections, the government became split between the New General National Congress in Tripoli and the internationally recognized legislature of the House of Representatives in Tobruk.

=== Presidency ===
In early October 2014, the United Nations envoy to Libya, Bernardino León, proposed a National Unity Government for Libya, to be led by the Presidential Council of Fayez al-Sarraj, as prime minister, three deputies from the country's eastern, western, and southern regions, and two ministers. However, this national unity government was rejected by the internationally recognized legislature in Tobruk and the rival government in Tripoli. Fayez al-Sarraj, and six members of the Presidential Council and proposed cabinet arrived in Tripoli on 30 March 2016. The following day, it was reported that the GNA had taken control of the prime ministerial offices and that the GNC appointed prime minister Khalifa al-Ghawil had fled to Misrata. On 14 October 2014, forces loyal to GNC took over the building of the High Council of State and announced the comeback of Ghawil cabinet. Then, fighting occurred between Sarraj loyalists and Ghawil forces.

Al-Sarraj was accused of obtaining ni-Vanuatu citizenship for himself and his family in January 2020 by The Guardian. In April 2023, The Guardian retracted the claim, and apologized for the mistake.

On 16 September 2020, al-Sarraj stated that he will be stepping down from his position by the end of October 2020, following a month of protests in Tripoli. On 31 October 2020, al-Sarraj rescinded his decision to resign. Following the Libyan Political Dialogue Forum, he transferred his powers on 15 March 2021.

== Government of National Accord ==
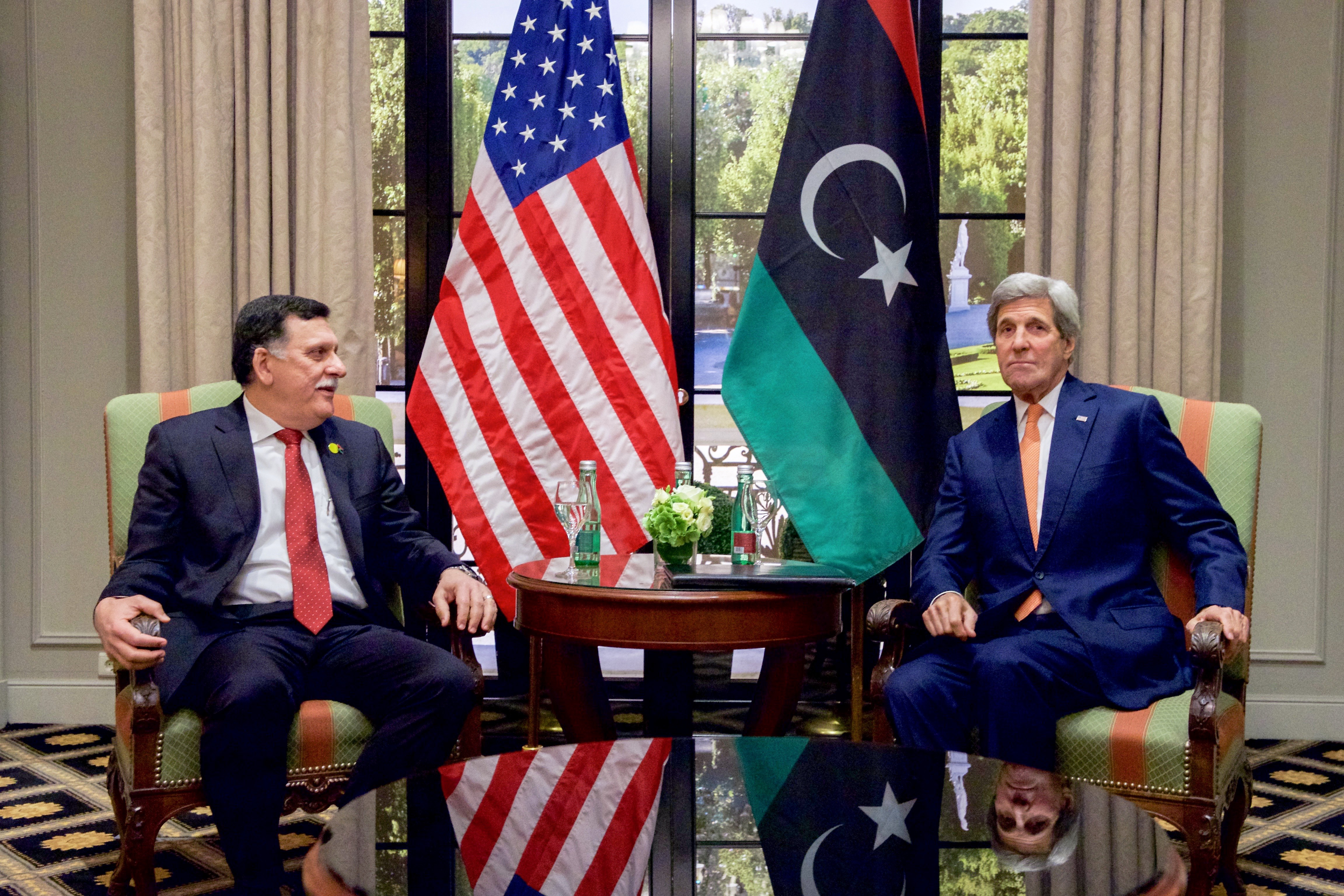
Sarraj with U.S. Secretary of State John Kerry, 16 May 2016

Sarraj has been Prime Minister of the Government of National Accord since its installment in December 2015 as part of a United Nations-led political agreement.

Prior to his initial arrival in Tripoli in March 2016, Sarraj survived two separate assassination attempts.

Over the past two years, the GNA has struggled to gain a foothold as a legitimate institution of authority inside the country, and Libya has remained divided. The government's initial proposed group of ministers was rejected by the House of Representatives (HoR), leading Sarraj to form a government that received a no confidence vote from the HoR. Infighting among rival militias has only intensified, and Libyan citizens have faced economic hardships, including inflation, corruption, and smuggling, that are "melting away the country's cash reserves".

The United Nations representatives who initially formed the unity government have since expressed concern over its ability to make progress. In December 2016, the Security Council noted the "limited authority" of the GNA and stated that "the Libyan Political Agreement did not fulfill the expectations. The implementation has stalled."

Months following this statement, an April 2017 U.N. Security Council meeting summary cautioned that "Libya could relapse into conflict" and said the government has struggled to "deliver basic services while endeavoring to fight terrorism, illegal migration and oil smuggling."

In an attempt to make the government more effective, reports have surfaced throughout 2017 of a consensus to restructure the GNA and overall Libyan Political Agreement.

In July 2018, Libya rejected European Union's plan aimed at stopping migration from Libya.

On 10 April 2019, United Nations chief António Guterres said, at the UN headquarters, that he still hopes to avoid a "bloody battle for Tripoli". Two days before that, troops loyal to Khalifa Haftar began moving toward the capital.

== Notes ==
Political offices
Preceded by Aguila Saleh Issa as President of the House of Representatives of Libya	Chairman of the Libyan Presidential Council; 2016–2021	Succeeded by Mohamed al-Menfi
Preceded by Abdullah al-Thani	Prime Minister of Libya; 2016–2021	Succeeded by Abdul Hamid Al-Dabaib
