= Government of National Accord =

Interim government of Libya (2015–2021)

Government of National Accord حكومة الوفاق الوطني

Provisional government overview
- Formed: 17 December 2015
- Dissolved: 10 March 2021
- Superseding Provisional government: Government of National Unity (merged with Tobruk-based Government)
- Jurisdiction: Libya
- Headquarters: Tripoli

Government of National Accord (GNA)
- حكومة الوفاق الوطني
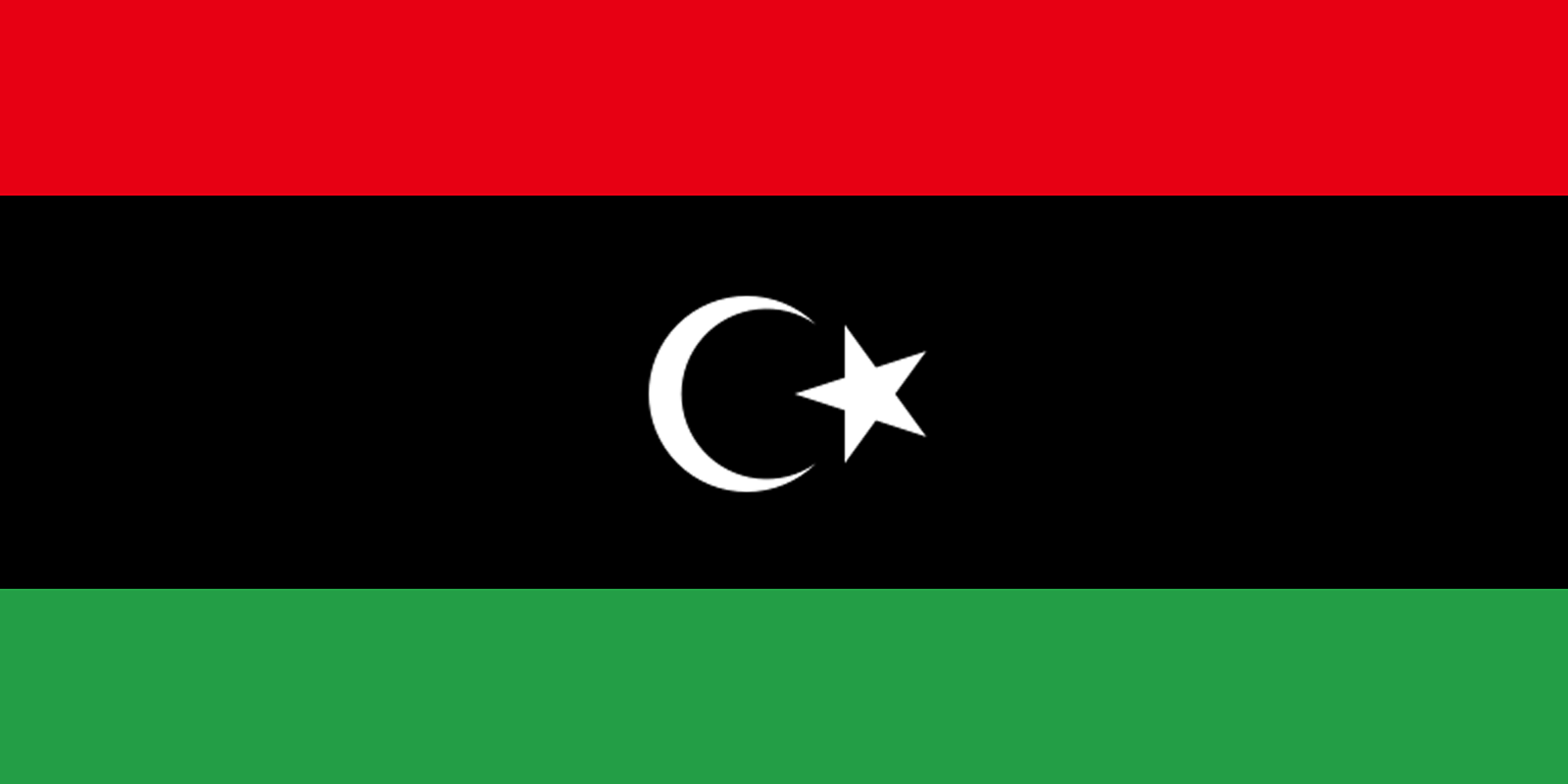
- Political leader: Nouri Abusahmain (2015–2016); Fayez al-Sarraj (2016–2021)
- Dates active: 2015–2021
- Country: Libya
- Groups: Libyan Army; Libyan Air Force; Libyan Navy
- Headquarters: Tripoli, Libya
- Wars: Second Libyan Civil War

The Government of National Accord (GNA; Arabic: حكومة الوفاق الوطني) was an interim government for Libya that was formed under the terms of the Libyan Political Agreement, a United Nations–led initiative, signed on 17 December 2015. The agreement was unanimously endorsed by the United Nations Security Council, which welcomed the formation of a Presidency Council for Libya and recognized the Government of National Accord as the sole legitimate executive authority in Libya. On 31 December 2015, Chairman of the Libyan House of Representatives, Aguila Saleh Issa declared his support for the Libyan Political Agreement. The General National Congress has criticized the GNA on multiple fronts as biased in favor of its rival parliament the House of Representatives.

As of 2016, the Government of National Accord had 17 ministers and was led by the Prime Minister. The first meeting of the cabinet of the GNA took place on 2 January 2016 in Tunis. A full cabinet consisting of 18 ministers was announced in January 2016.

The Prime Minister of the GNA, Fayez al-Sarraj, and six other members of the Presidential Council and proposed cabinet arrived in Tripoli on 30 March 2016. The following day, it was reported that GNA has taken control of the prime ministerial offices.

After March 2016, conflict between the two rival parliaments, the Libyan House of Representatives and the General National Congress (GNC), intensified. Despite previously supporting it, the Libyan House of Representatives withdrew its recognition of GNA by voting against it in the summer of 2016 and becoming their rival for governing the country. Despite being backed by only parts of the GNC and without formal approval from the Libyan House of Representatives, who called for new elections to be held by February 2018, the GNA continued to be recognized by the United Nations as Libya's legitimate government as late as September 2020.

From 2015 to 2016, GNA struggled to assert its authority and was largely unsuccessful in unifying Libya. The Government of National Accord's ultimate viability was uncertain given that the country remained greatly divided across political, tribal and ideological lines.

The mandate and legality of the Government of National Accord expired in 2017 according to the Libyan Political Agreement, Parliament and the United Nations which endorsed it.

On 10 March 2021, the House of Representatives formally approved the formation of a Government of National Unity led by Mohamed al-Menfi as chairman of the Presidential Council and Abdul Hamid Dbeibeh as Prime Minister with the aim of unifying the Government of National Accord with the rival Tobruk-based Government.

== Background ==
Ever since a NATO supported popular uprising toppled leader Muammar Gaddafi in 2011 during the Libyan Civil War, Libya has experienced a period of political instability. Immediately after Gaddafi's death in 2011, an interim leadership council known as the National Transitional Council took control of the country until the General National Congress was democratically elected in 2012.

=== Division under the GNC ===
Following the 2012 creation of the GNC, several factions have expressed concern with its actions. While the majority of elected officials in the GNC were moderate or liberal, there was a strong minority of representatives of Islamist parties, including the elected president, Nouri Abusahmain, causing unrest among liberals and exasperating political divides in Libya. Further decisions to impose exclusionary rules that prevent those who served under Gaddafi from holding office in the GNC, to impose sharia law, and to extend the mandate of the GNC another year, postponing general elections also caused dissent towards the GNC. On February 14, 2014, Khalifa Haftar called for the dissolution of the GNC, and creation of a president's council that could better organize a constitution and free elections and in May he led a militia offensive called Operation Dignity which seized control of Tripoli.

On June 25, 2014, elections were held for the new Libya legislative body, the House of Representatives or Libyan House of Representatives, even as Haftar's militia continued its campaign with attacks in Benghazi. Moderate and liberal groups became the majority of the Libyan House of Representatives, but because of low turnouts (estimated as low as 18% of the electorate), Islamist groups rejected the results. Meanwhile, Islamist militias began attacks and bombings in major cities, including the assassination of Salwa Bughaighis, a women's rights activist, in Benghazi and a car bombing in al-Bayda. Islamist militias soon seized control of Misrata and created its own campaign, called Operation Libya Dawn. This led the Libyan House of Representatives to flee from Tripoli to Tobruk.

The results of these conflicts were a renewed civil war and a divided Libyan government, with anti-Islamist groups in Tripoli, Islamist groups in Misrata, and the internationally backed Libyan House of Representatives relocated to Tobruk. As this civil war continued, efforts to create a new national unity government began.

== History ==
=== Creation ===
Efforts to mend divisions in Libya began in early 2015. On January 15, 2015, Operation Dignity forces agreed to a ceasefire with Operation Libya Dawn, while the Tobruk government agreed to talks with the Libya Dawn backed GNC, but several key members of Libya Dawn and its GNC government did not attend the planned talks in Geneva. Throughout the first half of 2015, the United Nations facilitated talks between factions to draft a plans for a unity government that would bring an end to the civil war, but those proposals met resistance from all factions, with a fourth draft being rejected by the Libyan House of Representatives on June 9.

After continued talks throughout the remainder of 2015, a peace agreement between the two factions was signed on December 17 in Skhirat, Morocco. The agreement created a Presidential Council and the High Council of State and established the Government of National Accord. Despite bipartisan support of the agreement, both factions also had members who did not support the deal and it was feared that well-armed militias would not comply to deal. After an endorsement by the United Nations Security Council, the GNA was almost immediately recognized by the international community as Libya's legitimate government. Federica Mogherini, the EU foreign policy chief, called the agreement an “essential step” and said that only a unity government would be equipped to “end political divisions, defeat terrorism, and address the numerous security, humanitarian, and economic challenges the country faces."

The GNA held its first meeting in Tunis on January 8, 2016, had nominated ministers to all positions by February and received a vote of confidence from the Libyan House of Representatives in on March 12, 2016. On March 30, 2016, the Government of National Accord moved its Presidential Council to Tripoli despite threats from militant groups in the city. The Presidential Council is currently operating out of a naval base in the city. Support for the GNA has since continued to grow. Elders from the Tuareg and Toubou peoples have expressed support for the GNA.

=== Conflict with the Tobruk government ===
Despite the early deals that were made, the Tobruk-based Libyan House of Representatives voted against approving the GNA during the summer of 2016 and became their rival for governing Libya. In the early months of 2017, cooperation between the two governments broke down completely. In February, a meeting between Field Marshal Khalifa Haftar and Prime Minister Sarraj took place in Cairo, but despite Egyptian and Russian pressure the two sides were unable to come to an agreement. In March, the pro-GNA Benghazi Defense Brigades seized control of the oil facilities in the Gulf of Sidra region from the eastern parliament's Libyan National Army, which had captured them back in September 2016. The LNA launched a counterattack and the Tobruk government demanded the GNA to condemn their acts. The Libyan House of Representatives later withdrew its recognition of the GNA and called for new elections to be held by early 2018.

During early 2017, the GNA still lacked popular support due to its weak military force and inability to control Tripoli. However, in late April and early May a meeting occurred between Prime Minister Sarraj and Field Marshal Haftar in Abu Dhabi. They met for two hours and sources suggest that their meeting was positive, with the premier later stating that they both agreed on the need for a peaceful solution. Reportedly the meeting materialized thanks to pressure on Haftar by the UAE. They also agreed to form a new Presidential Council as part of a power-sharing agreement and hold elections in March 2018.

In May 2018, talks occurred in Paris, France, where leaders of the Government of National Accord and representatives of Haftar's Libyan National Army agreed on establishing a legal framework by 16 September 2018 to hold a general election in December. The election did not occur before December, with another series of talks known as the Palermo Conference in November 2018 promising an election to take place either in early 2019 or in June of that year.

On 16 September, Fayez al-Sarraj stated that he will be stepping down from his position by the end of October 2020. This has come after one month of protests in Tripoli. However, on 31 October 2020, al-Sarraj rescinded his decision to resign and plans to remain in office until national elections can be arranged and a new presidential council is selected. Elections are one of the issues scheduled to be discussed during intra-Libyan dialogues on 9 November 2020.

== Key documents ==
=== Libyan Political Agreement ===
The Government of National Accord is codified in the Libyan Political Agreement signed on 17 December 2015 at a conference in Skhirat, Morocco. This agreement has been unanimously endorsed by the United Nations Security Council which has recognized that the Government of National Accord as the sole legitimate government of Libya. It also establishes the High Council of State, a consultative body independent of the GNA.

According to the original document, the Libyan Political Agreement is founded on four main principles: “Ensuring the democratic rights of the Libyan people, the need for a consensual government based on the principle of the separation of powers, oversight and balance between them, as well as the need to empower state institutions like the Government of National Accord so that they can address the serious challenges ahead, respect for the Libyan judiciary and its independence."

The Libyan political agreement expired in 2017 and so was the legal mandate for the GNA.

=== Declaration of Principles ===
During the same time that the Libyan Political Agreement was signed, the two rival parliaments, the Libyan House of Representatives and the GNC, signed a Declaration of Principles between them in Tunis aimed at bringing about a national unity government. Despite occurring parallel to the Libyan Political Agreement, this new deal was separate to the U.N.-led agreement, a peace-process that has struggled to prove acceptable to either the GNC or the Libyan House of Representatives. This new declaration involved establishing a 10-person committee, 5 from each side, that together would select an interim prime minister and two deputies with full legislative elections taking place within two years.

Given that the GNC has refused to put forward candidates for a unity government under the U.N. process, this new deal was seen as a reaction and domestic response to the pressure exerted from the international community insisting that the U.N.-backed Government of National Accord was the only way forward in Libya. Many Libyans saw the U.N. process as a top-down agreement forced on them. With no signs of the U.N. incorporating this new deal into its peace process, U.N. special envoy to Libya, Martin Kobler, said the agreement was a good first step and insisted that the U.N.-backed Libyan Political Agreement represents the only means of uniting the country and requires a “rapid endorsement” by both sides.

== Institutions influencing the GNA ==
=== House of Representatives ===
Democratically elected in 2014, the Libyan House of Representatives was Libya's internationally recognized government prior to the creation of the GNA. Backed by the United Arab Emirates, Egypt and Russia, the House of Representatives is also supported by the Libyan National Army and its leader, Field Marshal Khalifa Haftar, who is behind the government's refusal to approve of the GNA.

Haftar has been steadily gaining power in Libya since the launch of his successful military campaign against jihadist and Islamist groups in Libya in 2014 and his successful seizure of four vital oil export terminals from the Petroleum Facilities Guard in Eastern Libya which have increased the country's oil production to its highest level in years.

Unlike his opponents in the GNA who have been steadily losing legitimacy, Haftar maintains a large and growing influence over the country, especially in the East. With the House of Representatives having withdrawn its recognition of the GNA, some security experts argue that if any potential changes to the Libyan Political Agreement do not meet Haftar's demands, it is unlikely that the unification process will succeed. Given Haftar's growing legitimacy in the country, the international community has indeed recognized that his participation is essential in establishing a viable government in Libya with British Foreign Secretary Boris Johnson having urged for his inclusion in any government in the future.

=== General National Congress ===
When elected in 2012 to replace the National Transitional Council, the GNC was made up of a majority of moderate officials with only the President, Nouri Abusahmain, and a few other officials representing Islamist parties. Many factions of the GNC later broke away from the group as they grew concerned with the government's actions especially as violence, caused by Islamist militias supported by leaders of the group, began to escalate. Currently, the GNC is backed by hardline Islamist groups and militias in Tripoli and Misrata, with little foreign support.

=== Egypt ===
Leader of the Libyan National Army, Haftar's refusal to negotiate with GNA Prime Minister al-Sarraj in February 2017 has disappointed the Egyptian government, who has supported his role of governing Libya. President Abdel Fattah al-Sisi has been strongly pushing for a settlement between the Libyan House of Representatives and the GNA in order to end the civil war and contain the spread of the Islamist and jihadist movement it has created. Egypt has expressed concerns that a continuation of the conflict will give Islamist groups in Libya, such as the Muslim Brotherhood, greater influence in the country. Apart from supplying Tobruk's government with significant arms deals, for Egypt, having the Eastern part of Libya under the role of a leader friendly to the country, in this case Haftar, would create a buffer zone with ISIS and any opposition to Sisi's government in Cairo.

=== Russia ===
Despite being opposed to the move by NATO to topple ex-leader Muammar Gaddafi, Russia did not block the UN resolution calling for an intervention in Libya in 2011. Since then, Russia has frequently used Libya as "an example of Western failures in the Middle East." The Russian government has affirmed that it intends to play a role in restoring a strong regime in the country. Days ahead of al-Sarraj's visit to Russia in March 2017, Putin's spokesman said, “Russia is interested in Libya finally becoming a working state after this barbaric intervention that was conducted from outside, that led to catastrophic consequences from the point of view of the Libyan state and the future of the Libyan people. That is why we are interested in the swift development of a durable power in Libya that can begin the process of restoring and recreating the state.” Russia has also recently met with al-Sarraj's rival factions where earlier last year, Haftar also paid a visit to Russia.

=== United States ===
The United States, together with the European Union was one of the first parties to recognize and welcome the GNA as Libya's new unity government. At the December 24, 2015 United Nations Security Council meeting, Ambassador Samantha Power said that "The United States urges all Libyans to unite behind the Libyan Political Agreement, and to take advantage of the opportunity presented by the formation of the GNA by working together toward peace, stability, and the rule of law.” The U.S. also issued a joint statement with the EU that described the new body as the “only legitimate government in Libya”. This came before an admission by former U.S. President Barack Obama in April 2016 that the “worst mistake” of his presidency was the failure to prepare for an aftermath of Gaddafi's overthrow.

Since 2015, the U.S. has carried out three air strikes in Libya in what it called a sustained air campaign that would help local anti-Islamic State forces fight the group. While there were plans in early 2016 to send 6,000 troops from a number of NATO countries, such as France and the United Kingdom, to train these local troops in fighting IS-affiliated groups, the GNA was reluctant to allow such a presence. In December 2016, U.S. Special Envoy to Libya, Jonathan Winer, told Congress that the United States remained at the forefront of efforts to “broaden support” for the GNA.

On 27 June 2020, the GNA called for the United States and the European Union to impose sanctions over the activities of Russian mercenaries such as the Wagner Group and other foreign actors after they force their way into the Sharara oilfield.

=== Turkey ===
Recep Tayyip Erdoğan voiced his support for the GNA, saying that Turkey would "spare no effort in confronting the conspiracy against the Libyan people." Hence, Turkey has provided drones, armored vehicles and munitions to the GNA. Moreover, a controversial memorandum of understanding (MoU) on maritime boundaries was signed between the two sides, which caused political turmoil in the region between Turkey Cyprus, Greece and Egypt. On 2 January 2020, the Turkish Grand National Assembly voted 325–184 to send troops to help the GNA during the Western Libya offensive. Turkish support for the Government of National accord caused tensions in the region related to the Aegean dispute.

The Greek, Egyptian, United Arab Emirates, French, German, Syrian, and well as wider European governments, as well as members of the Libyan public voiced strong opposition to the Turkish intervention resulting in the expulsion of diplomats belonging to the GNA over Turkish-GNA agreements involving sovereign changes to maritime borders stating that they are illegal.

Furthermore, on 12 December 2019, the European Council stressed(2) that the Turkey-Libya memorandum of understanding on the delimitation of maritime jurisdictions in the Mediterranean Sea infringes upon the sovereign rights of third States, does not comply with the Law of the Sea and cannot produce any legal consequences for third States. The European Council also reconfirmed the European Union’s position on Turkey’s illegal drilling activities in Cyprus’ Exclusive Economic Zone.

— High Representative of the European Union for Foreign Affairs and Security Policy and Vice President of the European Commission

According to international law, Libyan political agreement, and the elected House of Representatives / Parliament, the Government of National Accord is an interim / transitional government that is not within responsible and legal capability to agree to agreements involving sovereign changes to territory, as well as accept any weapons sales. However Turkey has continuously bypassed & disregarded UN arms sanctions, Arms sales, and Signed Military agreements with disregard for international law, as well as Libyan law arms sale and transfer sanctions, and counter-agreeing with Memorandums of Understanding with the opposing eastern Tobruk parliament, raising serious tensions in the region and ultimately resulting in a near military confrontation between the Greek, Egyptian Navy and the Turkish Navy over the "Mavi Vatan", RV MTA Oruç Reis maritime research vessel and Aegean dispute incident resulting in a Greek navy ship ramming a Turkish navy military ship and calls for an international effort to calm tensions resulting in the Libyan civil war 2019-2020 ceasefire efforts.

Turkey has sent between 5000 and 15,000 Syrian Mercenaries to 'bolster' the Government of National Accord to occupy and maintain a presence in major bases in the Tripoli region, including: Al-Yarmouk base, Sidi Bilal base, Mitiga airport, Tripoli naval base, Al Watiya Airbase, and more.

=== Qatar ===
Qatar has provided support for the GNA, as well as the GNC and its very controversial members such as Sadiq Al Ghariani since the beginning of the First Libyan Civil War in the toppling of Muammar Gaddafi with weapons, funds, special forces and agreements to occupy bases, in its continuous visits by special forces Brigadier General Hamad bin Abdullah Al-Fetais al-Marri and 'signing military agreements' with so called 'Defense Minister' of the GNA. In Alliance with Turkey, Qatar has agreed to establish a base in North Africa ( Libya ) by providing weapons, arms and funds in support for the Government of National Accord according to their 'Defense agreements'. Saudi Arabia wants Hamad Bin Fattis, the UAE, Egypt and Bahrain for terrorism, issued in a list of 59 individuals and 12 entities.

=== United Arab Emirates ===
The UAE provided aerial support in the Libyan Civil War in support of The House of representatives of Tobruk and parliament, of which General Haftar's Libyan National Army fought in the 2019–20 Western Libya campaign conflict with the GNA. Al-Jazeera reported that the UAE "has, by some estimates, carried out as many as 850 strikes in support of the Libyan national army led by Haftar since operation launched on Tripoli [in 2019]."

The GNA condemned the peace agreement between Israel and the United Arab Emirates as an "unsurprising betrayal from the UAE."

=== Algeria and Tunisia ===
Unlike other regional powers, Algeria and Tunisia have not built a network of proxies in Libya but have instead been vocal supporters of reconciliation and a political solution while closely coordinating with each other to contain the spillover from the Islamic State's presence in Libya.

=== Islamic State ===
In October 2014, the Islamic Youth Shura Council (IYSC) declared that Derna, a small town on the northeastern coast and some 720 km (450 miles) from Tripoli, had become the first Libyan town to join the global caliphate. In late 2014, Abu Bakr al-Baghdadi recognised the presence of ISIS in Libya, declaring three wilayats: Barqa (eastern Libya), with Derna as its base; Tarablus (Tripoli), with Sirte as its base; and Fezzan (southwestern Libya).

As another rival to the GNA and made up of foreign fighters, defectors from local jihadi groups and local returnees from Syria, the Islamic State was driven from its first headquarters in Derna in 2015 by anti-Haftar forces and began establishing a new base in Sirte. Sirte became the Islamic State's stronghold in Libya until May 2016 when a coalition of Misrata-dominated forces loyal to the GNA known as Bunyan al-Marsous (BAM) declared war on the Islamic State there. On April 2, 2016, these Misrata-based militias had declared their loyalty to the GNA in order to legitimize themselves as a military force fighting for the country's internationally backed government. The BAM operation in May was accompanied by over 400 U.S. air strikes over a six-month period. On December 6, 2016, the Libyan National Army aligned with the GNA to capture Sirte with victory being declared that month. While the Islamic State lost Sirte, it is believed that many of its fighters remain in Libya operating sleeper cells in Tripoli and other cities and towns across the country.

U.S. Special Envoy to Libya, Jonathan Winer, warned the United States House Committee on Foreign Affairs on November 30, 2016, that the Islamic State could cause more trouble in Libya. “If Libyans choose to fight each other instead of uniting, they risk increasing the probability that ISIL and other violent extremists in its mould will be back," he said.

== Structure and ministers ==
The Government of National Accord under the Libyan Political Agreement comprises a Cabinet of Ministers and a Presidential Council. The Presidential Council, made up of nine members and chaired by the Prime Minister, acts collectively as head of state and supreme commander of the armed forces, appointing thus the country's military leadership. According to the agreement, the Presidential Council presides over the Cabinet of Ministers, also based in Tripoli, and also appoints its members.

The Cabinet of the Government of National Accord, which acts as the government's executive branch, has 17 ministers and is led by Prime Minister Fayez al-Sarraj and two Deputy Prime Ministers, Ahmed Maiteeq and Musa Al-Koni. Ministers in the cabinet need to be unanimously approved by the Prime Minister and his deputies and ministers can likewise only be removed with a unanimous decision of the Prime Minister and his deputies.

The Government of National Accord is granted a one-year term from the date the Libyan House of Representatives grants it a vote of confidence, but this term will be automatically extended an additional year if a new constitution is not completed and implemented during the term. The GNA can also be dissolved by a vote of no confidence from the Libyan House of Representatives, or by the death, vacancy, or resignation of the Prime Minister.

The following ministers were proposed in January 2016:

Incumbent	Office	Former allegiance	Website	Since	Until
Fayez al-Sarraj	Prime Minister of Libya; Minister of Defense		www.pm.gov.ly	5 April 2016; 6 September 2018	
Ahmed Maiteeq	Deputy Prime Minister			30 March 2016	
Musa Al-Koni	Deputy Prime Minister			30 March 2016	2 January 2017
Fathi Al-Mijabri	Deputy Prime Minister				
Fakhr Muftah Bufernah	Minister of Finance		www.mof.gov.ly		30 June 2016
Juma Abdullah Drissi	Minister of Justice		www.aladel.gov.ly		30 June 2016
Omar Bashir Al-Taher	Minister of Health		www.health.gov.ly		
Al-Aref al-Khoga	Minister of Interior	Libya Dawn	www.moi.gov.ly	May 2014	15 February 2018
Abdussalam Ashour	Minister of Interior		www.moi.gov.ly	15 February 2018	7 October 2018
Fathi Bashagha	Minister of Interior			7 October 2018	
Mohamed Khalifa Al-Azzabi	Minister of Education		www.edu.gov.ly		
Mohamed Taha Siala	Minister of Foreign Affairs		www.foreign.gov.ly	January, 2016	
Al-Mahdi Al-Barghathi	Minister of Defense	Libyan House of Representatives	www.defense.gov.ly	January, 2016	29 July 2018
Al-Hadi Al-Taher Al-Juhaimi	Planning Minister		www.planning.gov.ly		2 January 2016
Faida Mansour El-Shafi	Minister of Social Affairs		www.socialaffairs.gov.ly		
Abdulmutaleb Ahmed Abu Farwa	Minister of Economy & Industry		www.industry.gov.ly		30 June 2016
Ali Galma Mohamed	Minister of Labour		www.labour.gov.ly		27 January 2017
Asma Mustafa Usta	Minister of State for Women's Affairs and Development				
Muhannad Said Younis	Minister of State for Martyrs, Wounded and Missing				
Iman Mohammed Ben Younes	Minister of State for Institutional Reform				
Abdeljawad Faraj Al-Obaidi	Minister of State for National Reconciliation				30 June 2016
Yousef Abubakr Jalalah	Minister of State for Migrants and Displaced				

Prime Minister Fayez al-Sarraj was born into a prominent local family, whose father, Mustafa Sarraj was also involved in politics and described by Al-Jazeera as "one of the founders of the modern state of Libya after its independence from Italy". After Gaddafi's fall in 2011, Fayez al-Sarraj became a member of the National Dialogue Commission, which worked to establish national consensus and unity in Libya. His nomination as Prime Minister was seen as a compromise between the rival parties as he is not affiliated to any party involved in the power struggle.

Deputy Prime Minister, Ahmed Maiteeq, served as prime minister for a short time and in the GNA represents the city of Misrata, which is the biggest political and military backer of the GNA. Misrata's militias were crucial in Gaddafi's downfall and have taken the lead in the fight against ISIS in Sirte. Misrata's militias and the Libyan National Army are the two most relevant military forces in the country.

The Central Bank of Libya and the National Oil Corporation (NOC), also based in Tripoli, have both pledged loyalty to the Presidential Council of the GNA even though the NOC has had good working relations with Haftar and his Libyan National Army after it seized eastern oil ports from Islamists. The government in Tobruk has also established its own Central Bank and its own Oil Corporation even though they are not recognized internationally.

== Calls for possible renegotiation of Libyan Political Agreement ==
On December 6, 2016, the UN special envoy to Libya Martin Kobler hinted before the United Nations Security Council meeting at the possibility of renegotiating the Libyan Political Agreement, which he said is “not set in stone”. He later said that the agreement “stands firm, but stuck”.

Western powers have become increasingly concerned that if infighting between the different political factions continues and the GNA is not recognized soon by the GNC, further turmoil will evolve and allow the Islamic State and other Islamist groups to gain further territory in the country.

A report published by the International Crisis Group in November 2016 has said that the Libyan Political Agreement has failed to calm the turbulence and warned that the country may descend into a "free-fall" if the country's peace process is not "reset". “The accord’s roadmap, the idea that a caretaker government accommodating the two parliaments and their allies could establish a new political order and reintegrate militias, can no longer be implemented without change," said the report.

Since its inception, the GNA has also been criticized domestically for focusing little on national reconciliation and improving the lives of the population and instead focusing on maintaining broad international support. Critics pushing for a negotiation of the Libyan Political Agreement are calling for changes in the setup of the GNA itself and the future role of Haftar in the government. Haftar's role in the new government remains one of the most contentious points in the Agreement. Haftar enjoys wide public support for successfully combating Islamists in eastern Libya, liberating four key oil ports from Islamist control and bringing relative security to Benghazi. Haftar supporters argue that dismissing him from any future government would not bring peace to the country while bringing him into the government can help the GNA seek a compromise with the Libyan House of Representatives that backs him.

== Criticism ==
Since its December 2015 inception, the GNA has made little progress in unifying the country and has proved ineffective in areas such as national security, the economy, and, most importantly, Libya's overall governance.

A number of media outlets have expressed doubt that the GNA will ever be able to assert itself as a true authority figure and garner support from its citizens, as various militias continue to hold vast control in Libya.

=== Negative perception ===
Martin Kobler, Head of the United Nations Support Mission in Libya (UNSMIL) and one of the organizers of the GNA, publicly challenged the government via Twitter just months after its installment. In June 2016, Kobler tweeted "Worried about the continued power cuts in large parts of tripoli. Urge #Gna to tackle energy supply for the population." In February 2017, Kobler acknowledged the GNA's shortcomings and said there was a growing consensus to reconfigure the Presidential Council.

In November 2016, writing in Foreign Affairs, Emadeddin Zahri Muntasser of the Libyan American Public Affairs Council and lobbyist for the General National Congress, said, "the GNA’s days are numbered. Very soon, Libyans might have to find yet another path."

In a November 2016 piece titled "A Western-backed deal to salvage Libya is falling apart", The Economist wrote, "The latest peace accord has merely reconfigured the conflict, not solved it." Specifically, it noted that:

"The GNA, for its part, has done little to win over the public. Services are sporadic at best, while the economy is teetering […] Prices have soared. The government is months behind on paying salaries."

Additionally, the GNA received a no confidence vote from the House of Representatives based in Tobruk. Out of 101 total deputies, only one person voted in favor of GNA. The government and General Haftar – backed by Parliament – have feuded since GNA's inception, creating an even more unstable political arena since Gaddafi's fall.

On 23 August 2020, protests erupted in the capital city of Tripoli, where hundreds protested the Government of National Accord for living conditions and corruption within the Government.

=== Leadership resignations ===
In January 2017, Deputy Prime Minister of GNA, Musa al-Koni, formally resigned, stating the government had "failed to tackle urgent problems arising from years of conflict and political disarray", Reuters reported. Specifically, al-Koni stated:

"I announce my resignation due to the failure of the Presidential Council, because it holds responsibility for the killing, kidnapping, and rape that happened over the past year."

In an August 2017 article, The National pointed out that nine of the original presidency members have subsequently quit since GNA took power, including the ministers for justice, reconciliation and finance.

== See also ==
- Presidential Council (Libya)
- House of Representatives (Libya)
- High Council of State (Libya)
