= Abdullah al-Theni =

Libyan politician

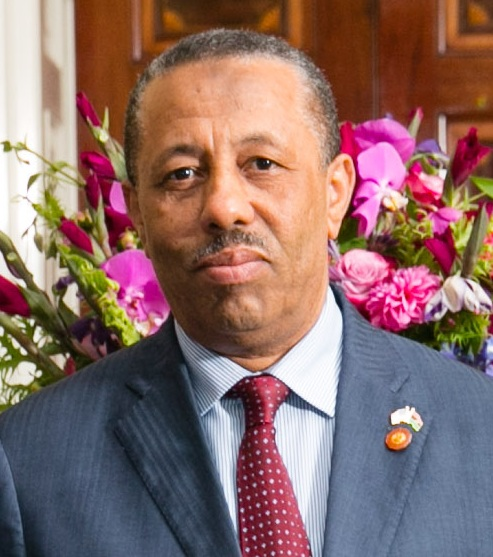
- al-Theni in 2014

26th Prime Minister of Libya
- In office 11 March 2014 – 15 March 2021*; Acting: 11 March 2014 – 8 April 2014
- President: Nouri Abusahmain (Note: as President of the General National Congress); Abu Bakr Baira (Note: as Acting Speaker of the House of Representatives); Aguila Saleh Issa (Note: as Speaker of the House of Representatives)
- Preceded by: Ali Zeidan
- Succeeded by: Fayez al-Sarraj (Note: as Chairman of the Presidential Council of Libya under the Government of National Accord, internationally recognized)); Abdul Hamid Dbeibeh (Note: as Chairman of the Presidential Council of Libya under the Government of National Unity)

Personal details
- Born: 7 January 1954 (age 72) Ma'tan as-Sarra, Libya
- Party: Independent
- Education: Benghazi Military University Academy
- *Theni's premiership was disputed by Ahmed Maiteeq, Omar al-Hassi, Khalifa al-Ghawil, and Fayez al-Sarraj.

Abdullah al-Theni (Arabic: عبد الله الثني Libyan pronunciation: [ʕæbˈdɑllɑ tˈtini, -ˈθæni]) is a Libyan politician who served as the prime minister of Libya, from 2014, when he took over in an interim capacity after the dismissal of Ali Zeidan, to 2021. In the context of the second Libyan civil war, he served as prime minister under the Tobruk-based government. His government received widespread international recognition until 2016 as well as backing from both the Libyan House of Representatives and the Libyan National Army. He was previously the defence minister in the government of Zeidan.

== Premiership ==
In April 2014, al-Thani negotiated the reopening of two out of four oil ports seized by rebels. Also, after he threatened to resign, the Congress officially confirmed him as prime minister in a permanent capacity and vested him with greater powers to deal with Libya's problems.

However, al-Thani submitted his resignation as prime minister of the interim government on 13 April 2014, although he was asked to stay on as a caretaker until the election of a successor. Ahmed Maiteeq was eventually elected as the new prime minister, but Maiteeq's election was voided on 9 June and al-Thani was reinstated as caretaker.

After the election of a House of Representatives to govern Libya, al-Thani attended the opening ceremony of the new parliament in Tobruk on 4 August 2014. He and his cabinet again resigned on 29 August 2014, citing a need to give the controversial new parliament a chance to choose a new, inclusive government after Islamist lawmakers convened a new meeting of the General National Congress in Tripoli and declared al-Thani dismissed, although he defended the elected House of Representatives as "the only legitimate authority in the country". The next week, however, the Tobruk-based lawmakers reappointed al-Thani as prime minister and tasked him with forming a "crisis government".

With Libya sliding into civil war between the two rival governments, al-Thani ordered General Khalifa Haftar to "liberate" Tripoli in October 2014. In March 2015, following the start of a military intervention in support of the internationally recognised government in Yemen, al-Thani compared the situation in his country to the situation in Yemen and said Libya would call on the Arab League to "restore legitimacy".

On 26 May 2015 he survived an assassination attempt when gunmen fired on his convoy in Tobruk.

Abdullah al-Thani offered to resign as prime minister on 11 August 2015, over a year into the Second Libyan Civil War, saying his "exit is the solution."

Al-Thani and the House of Representatives promoted Haftar to the rank of Field Marshal in recognition for his leadership in the Operation Surprise Lightning, capturing the four key oil ports (Sidra, Ra's Lanuf, Brega and Zuwetina) in the Gulf of Sirte from the Petroleum Facilities Guard (PFG) during the ongoing Libyan Civil War.

Al-Thani offered the resignation of his government on 13 September 2020 in response to the 2020 Libyan protests.

== See also ==
- First Al-Thani Cabinet
- Second Al-Thani Cabinet

== Notes ==
Political offices
| Preceded by Ali Zeidan | Prime Minister of Libya; 2014–2021 | Succeeded by Abdul Hamid Al-Dabaib |
