= Ali Zeidan =

Libyan politician (born 1950)

Ali Zeidan علي زيدان
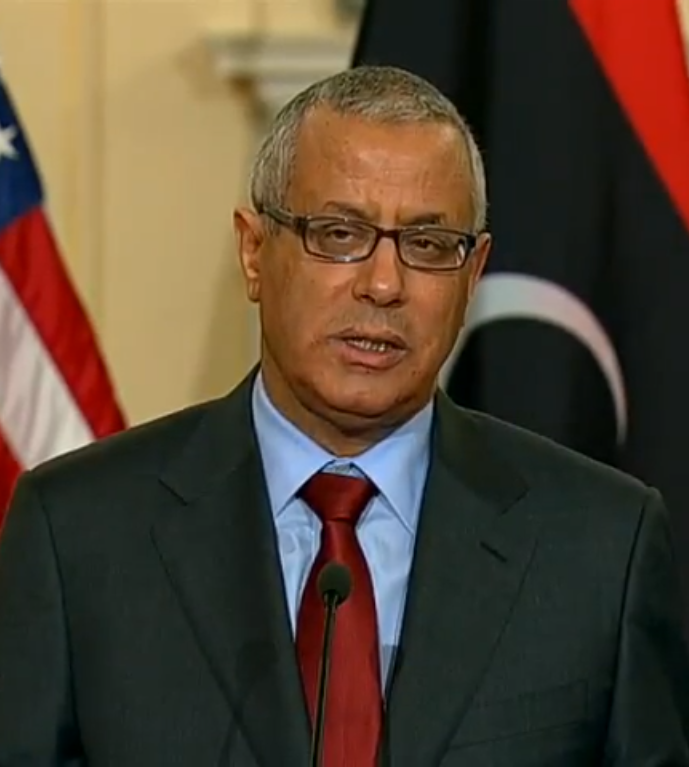
- Zeidan at the US State Department, 2013

Prime Minister of Libya
- In office 14 November 2012 – 11 March 2014
- President: Mohammed Magariaf; Juma Ahmad Atigha (Acting); Nouri Abusahmain
- Preceded by: Abdurrahim El-Keib
- Succeeded by: Abdullah al-Theni

Personal details
- Born: 5 December 1950 (age 75) Waddan, Fezzan-Ghadamès (now Libya)
- Citizenship: Libya; Germany
- Party: National Party For Development and Welfare
- Education: Jawaharlal Nehru University
- Religion: Sunni Islam

Ali Zeidan (sometimes written as Zidan; Arabic: علي زيدان; born 5 December 1950) is a former prime minister of Libya. He was appointed by the General National Congress on 14 October 2012, and took office on 14 November after Congress approved his cabinet nominees. Prior to the Libyan Civil War, Zeidan was a Geneva-based human rights lawyer. According to the BBC, he is considered by some local observers as a strong-minded liberal. He was ousted by the parliament committee and fled from Libya on 14 March 2014. However, he told a press conference in Rabat, Morocco, that the ousting was invalid.

== Career ==
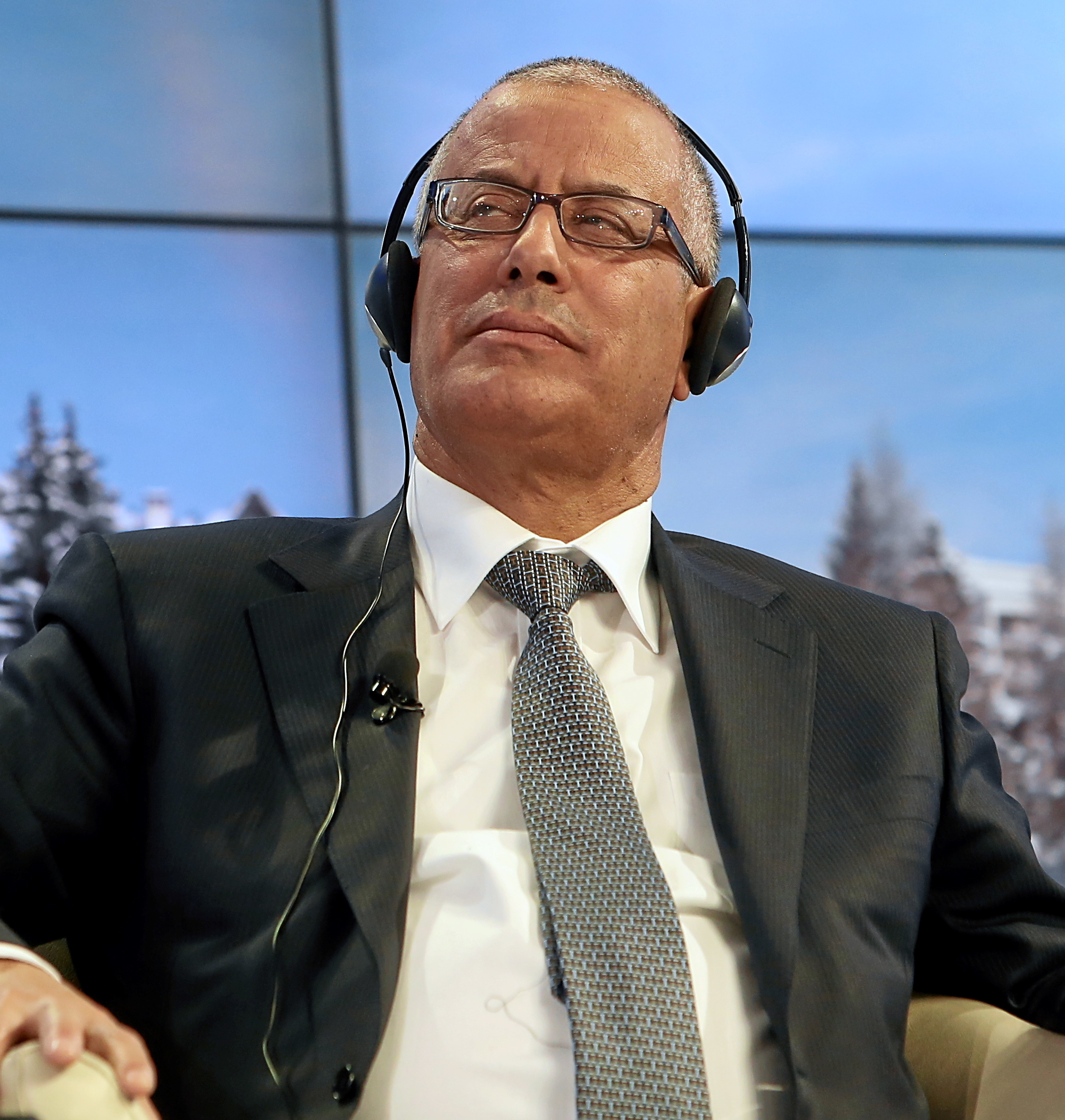
Zedan during the World Economic Forum 2013

Ali Zeidan was born in 1950, and grew up in the town of Waddan. He served as a diplomat for Libya during the 1970s, serving in India under Ambassador Mohammed Magariaf. Both men defected in 1980 and went on to form the National Front for the Salvation of Libya. Zeidan spent nearly three decades in exile in Geneva after the defection.

During the revolution, Zeidan served as the National Transitional Council's Europe envoy, and is credited for playing a key role in persuading French president Nicolas Sarkozy to support the anti-Gaddafi forces.

=== Congressman ===
On 7 July 2012, Zeidan was elected as an independent congressman for Jufra in the 2012 Congressional election. He ran for the position of Speaker of the Congress, but ultimately lost out to his former opposition colleague Mohammed Magariaf, obtaining 85 votes. On 10 October 2012, Zeidan resigned his seat in Congress.

=== Prime minister ===
Following Mustafa Abushagur's unsuccessful attempt to form a government, Zeidan resigned his seat in Congress and ran for the position of prime minister against the Justice and Construction Party's favoured candidate, Mohammed Al-Harari. Zeidan was elected prime minister-designate by a vote of 93 to 85, with two weeks to submit his proposed new government for approval by Congress. Zeidan was reported to have been supported by members of Congress belonging to the generally liberal National Forces Alliance (organized by Mahmoud Jibril), as well as by certain independents informally affiliated as the Workers group (with 20 members) and the Southern group (with 31).

Zeidan's cabinet was approved by Congress on 31 October 2012, although six of its members were referred for investigation into alleged links to the former Gaddafi regime. All six were subsequently cleared of the charges and Zeidan's government was sworn in on 14 November. Zeidan's cabinet avowedly aimed at geographical as well as political balance, including ministers from the National Forces Alliance, the Justice and Construction Party, and independents.

Zeidan was quoted as promising at his swearing-in that his government would abide by the Constitutional Declaration and "give its utmost best to the nation based on the rule of law, human rights, democracy, rights, and the belief in God, His Prophet and a state based on Islam".

== Kidnappings ==
=== 2013 ===
Zeidan was kidnapped by armed militants from the Corinthia Hotel in Tripoli during the early morning of 10 October 2013 and taken to an undisclosed location.

The group Joint Operations Room of Libya's Revolutionaries said they abducted Zeidan as a reaction to his government's alleged involvement in the American capture of Anas al-Liby, and his statements in late September calling for international assistance in building an official army and police force.

Zeidan was freed hours later.

=== 2017 ===
Zeidan was kidnapped again on 14 August 2017, by an armed group, being taken from a hotel in the Libyan capital of Tripoli. On 22 August, he was released without any reasons given by his kidnappers after being held for ten days in Tripoli and was taken near to Mehary Radisson Blu hotel.

== Dismissal ==
On 11 March 2014, the rogue oil tanker Morning Glory left the rebel port of Sidra, Libya, with Libyan oil that had been confiscated by the rebels. Ali Zeidan had promised to stop the departure, but failed. The same day, Zeidan was reported to have been ousted by the parliament committee and then to have fled to Europe, although fleeing the country was banned for him. However, he told the press conference in Rabat, Morocco, that the ousting was invalid.

== Alleged flight to Malta ==
On 8 June 2014, the Maltese government denied a Maltese blogger's claim that Ali Zeidan was residing in Malta, under the protection of the Maltese government.

Political offices
Preceded by Abdurrahim El-Keib	Prime Minister of Libya; 2012–2014	Succeeded by Abdullah al-Thani
