= Council of Cyrenaica in Libya =

Claimed regional government in Libya

Council of Cyrenaica in Libya مجلس برقة في ليبيا
- Abbreviation: CCL
- Leader: Abu Bakr Baira (House of Representatives)
- President: Ahmed al-Senussi
- Founded: 6 March 2012
- Headquarters: Benghazi, Libya
- Membership: 3,000
- Ideology: Federalism
- Colors: Black White

The Council of Cyrenaica in Libya (CCL; Arabic: مجلس برقة في ليبيا), formerly known as the Cyrenaica Transitional Council (CTC; Arabic: مجلس إقليم برقة الانتقالي), is a Libyan federalist political organisation that claims to be the devolved government of the region of Cyrenaica. It calls for the restoration of the federalist 1951 constitution, with the creation of a regional parliament of Cyrenaica that would hold devolved control over domestic affairs and security policy. Since 2012, it has been led by Ahmed al-Senussi, who was elected president of Cyrenaica at its founding conference of 3,000 members. Since 2014, its leader in the House of Representatives has been Abu Bakr Baira. Its military branch is the Army of Cyrenaica (AC; Arabic: جيش برقة), which is led by Colonel Hamid Hassi and supports the Libyan National Army of Khalifa Haftar.

== History ==
In the aftermath of the 2011 Libyan civil war, fears emerged in Cyrenaica—the eastern region of Libya—that the region would once again become marginalised and neglected by the new Western-based government, as was commonly seen to be the case under the previous regime of former longtime leader Muammar Gaddafi. To address these concerns, around 3,000 political, military, and tribal leaders from the region met in Benghazi on 6 March 2012 and declared the formation of the Cyrenaica Transitional Council (CTC) to serve as the autonomous regional government of Cyrenaica. Prominent individuals involved in the declaration included Abu Bakr Baira and Ahmed al-Senussi, the latter of whom was elected as the leader of the council and as the claimed president of Cyrenaica by the delegates. The council's founding declaration dedicated it to the promotion of Cyrenaican autonomy within a unified Libyan state as well as the restoration of the 1951 constitution, which outlined a federalist system between the three provinces of Libya. The legal status of the new council was disputed, with the National Transitional Council (NTC) rejecting the declaration and the CTC's authority and threatening to restore order in the region by force if necessary.

The formation of the council was seen as causing a political crisis and challenging the authority of the NTC, which had been set up as an interim government for Libya after the end of the civil war. It also began the new Libyan federalist movement, which emerged in the aftermath of the civil war. The council's formation was met with significant anti-federalist backlash across the country, with the NTC warning that federalism was a "foreign plot" to partition Libya, while political parties condemned it, with critics viewing the council as a red herring for Cyrenaican independence, an accusation it denied. There was violent retaliation by Islamist and anti-federalist forces in some parts of the country, with pro-federalist demonstrators fired upon in the streets of Benghazi. In response, the CTC boycotted the post-war political process and withdrew its recognition of the NTC as Libya's legal government, choosing to pursue nonviolent resistance against the NTC. It refused to stand in the 2012 Libyan parliamentary election, protesting the NTC's decision to distribute seats by population rather than equally between the three provinces.

The decision to boycott the political process led to a loss of influence for the CTC. In 2013, a split emerged in the Cyrenaica federalist movement between the nonviolent CTC and forces supportive of violent resistance led by militia commander Ibrahim Jadhran, who declared his own rival regional government, the Political Bureau of Cyrenaica (PBC), and seized control of the region's ports and oil rigs, bringing the wider economy of Libya to a standstill. Ahmed al-Senussi tried to negotiate with members of the PBC to form a united front but failed to reach an agreement, with Senussi claiming that the PBC had proved "inflexible" and was intent on pursuing its own agenda. The CTC opposed Jadhran's violent approach, with Abu Bakr Baira stating that it was counterproductive and threatened federalist aims.

After failing to reach an agreement with the PBC, al-Senussi decided to distance the CTC from it. He changed the CTC's name to the Council of Cyrenaica in Libya (CCL) and ended its boycott of the political process. In October 2013, al-Senussi reaffirmed the CCL's claim to forming the regional government of Cyrenaica and also announced plans to establish a new regional parliament and shura council via peaceful and legal means. Nouri Abusahmain, head of the General National Congress, dismissed the CCL and PBC and rejected their legitimacy, accusing them of "representing nobody but themselves".

The CCL stood in the 2014 Libyan parliamentary election, with Abu Bakr Baira as its parliamentary leader. It won 30 of the 60 seats allocated to Cyrenaica and became one of the most influential blocs in the House of Representatives (HoR) under Baira's leadership, also benefiting from a boycott of the new parliament by politicians in the western region of Tripolitania. After the election, Baira served as the acting speaker of the HoR and ran to hold the position permanently but was narrowly defeated by independent member Aguila Saleh Issa.

== Army of Cyrenaica ==
The CCL has a military arm, the Army of Cyrenaica (AC), which was originally founded by the NTC during the 2011 civil war to defend Cyrenaica from forces loyal to former Libyan leader Muammar Gaddafi. The commander of the AC is colonel Hamid Hassi, who previously served as an officer in the air force during the Gaddafist regime. He is a member of the Hassi tribe, which is supportive of Cyrenaican federalism, with several senior members of the CCL's rival, the PBC, coming from the tribe. The army is made up of former Libyan army officers who grew disillusioned after they were marginalised by national militia leaders following the overthrow of Gaddafi, and it also draws support from most tribes in Cyrenaica. Since 2014, it has supported Khalifa Haftar's Libyan National Army.

In June 2012, the AC set up a blockade on the coastal motorway connecting Tripoli with Benghazi at Wadi al Ahmar, the historic boundary between Cyrenaica and Tripolitania, to promote Cyrenaican federalism. In November 2012, Hassi survived an assassination attempt in Benghazi. He survived another attempt on his life in Tripoli in July 2013. In February 2013, it was reported on the Facebook page of the General National Congress that Hassi was shot at in Tripoli, but this was quickly deleted; according to Hassi, he avoided an attempted arrest by an unknown militia in the city later that same month.
