= 2013 Libyan coup attempt =

Attempted overthrow of Prime Minister Ali Zeidan

- Part of the Arab Spring and Factional violence in Libya
Date	10 October 2013
Location	Corinthia Hotel Tripoli & Fornej, Tripoli, Libya 32°53′14″N 13°11′29″E
Result	Coup fails Prime Minister Ali Zeidan released

Belligerents
(Libya) Libyan Government; Pro-Government militias; Zintan Militia; 106 Brigade; First Support Brigade; Pro-Government protesters	Opposition; Libya Revolutionaries Operations Room; Counter Crime Agency; Opposition members of the GNC

Commanders and leaders
Ali Zeidan; Prime Minister of Libya Haitham al-Tajouri; First Support Brigade Commander	Mustafa Treiki; GNC Member; Mohamed al-Kilani; GNC Member; Abdelmonem al-Said; CCA Fornaj Commander; Abdul Hakkim Belazi; CCA Spokesperson Abdel-Moneim al-Hour; CCA Official

Strength
	~150 militiamen (at hotel)
- Location within Libya

The 2013 Libyan coup attempt was a coup d'état attempt by a group of members of the General National Congress to take control of the country from Libyan Prime Minister Ali Zeidan. Zeidan was kidnapped in the early hours of the 10 October by armed gunmen and was then released several hours later after a pro-government militia stormed the site where he was being held. Following his release Zeidan claimed the incident was an attempted coup orchestrated by two militias in line with members of the GNC opposed to Zeidan.

== Background ==
Following the Libyan Civil War, the new Libyan government lacks an effective police force and military. Whilst the government attempts to build up their own centralised security forces the Libyan Government has coopted and employed various militias. Although under the pay of the defence and interior ministries, many of these groups are not wholly under the control of or loyal to the Libyan Government.

On 5 October 2013 U.S. Army "Delta Force" operators captured Anas al-Liby in Tripoli, Libya. Al-Liby had worked as a computer analyst for al-Qaeda and was wanted in the United States for his part in the 1998 United States embassy bombings. A day after Al-Liby was captured, he was in military custody on the ship USS San Antonio in the Mediterranean Sea. He will be sent to New York City for criminal prosecution.

U.S. officials claimed that the Libyan government had approved of the raid, although the Libyan Government officially denied any involvement and called the incident a kidnapping. In spite of the Libyan government's official denials, many Libyans believed their government to have been involved, or to have at least approved of the raid. As a result of this, the Islamist government was strongly criticized, and an anti-government protest was held in Benghazi on Monday 7 of October.

== Events ==
=== Capture ===
In the early hours of Thursday 10 October 2013 Zeidan was kidnapped from the Corinthia Hotel in Tripoli by armed militants and taken to an undisclosed location. The group of up to 150 militants had seemingly arrived at the hotel in pick-up trucks, and then a large group had entered the building with some militants remaining in the reception whilst others headed to the 21st floor, where Zeidan was staying. The militants scuffled with Zeidan's bodyguards, before seizing him. Zeidan offered no resistance as he was being led away, and the militants led him out of the hotel at around 5:15 AM. Nobody was killed in Zeidan's seizure.

Zeidan later claimed that the kidnappers did not appear to have a fully developed plan, and that his kidnappers were unsure of where to take him following his abduction. Zeidan claimed that his kidnappers initially attempted to take him to Zawiya, but then decided to take him to Sha'ab sea front area of Tripoli, before finally settling on taking him to the CCA building in Fornaj. Zeidan also mention that the streets of Tripoli were devoid of security patrols during the episode.

=== Confusion ===
The kidnapping caused confusion for several hours, and many in Tripoli feared that a coup was underway. The Libyan Prime Ministers Office denied early reports of a kidnapping, and dispelled such claims as rumors on its Facebook page. The Office later acknowledged the kidnapping, and claimed that they had been coerced by the kidnappers to deny any reports. Police units left the Corinthia hotel area and the Prime Ministers Office, and were instead replaced with anti-government militiamen who claimed that Zeidan had been arrested. Abdel-Moneim al-Hour, an official with the interior ministry's anti-crime committee, also claimed that Zeidan was under arrest and would be charged with violating state security. In response to the developing crisis the Libyan Cabinet met for an emergency meeting at the Electricity Ministry.

The Zintan militia, one of the strongest armed groups in Libya, sided with the Government, and mobilised units and threatened to move on Tripoli and "level" the bases of the militias responsible for the kidnapping.

The group Libyan Revolutionaries Operations Room said they abducted Zeidan as a reaction to the government of Libya's involvement in the American capture of Anas al-Liby, and his statements in late September calling for an international force to be sent to Libya to disarm and liquidate the revolutionary militias that worked with NATO to overthrow and kill Libyan leader Muammar Gaddafi. The group also claimed that they had been acting "on the prosecutor's orders", although the public prosecutor's office denied having issued a warrant for Zeidan's arrest.

GNC President Nouri Abusahmain visited Zeidan and his kidnappers for some 20 minutes, attempting to persuade the kidnappers to release him. Deputy Defence Minister Khaled al-Sharrif arrived with Abusahmain, and remained at the building for several hours after Abusahmain had left, also trying to persuade the kidnappers to release Zeidan. Sharrif eventually left to report to the GNC.

=== Release ===
The building where Zeidan was being held was surrounded by local residents of Fornaj and pro-Government units, including the First Support Brigade under the command of Haitham Tajouri, and the 106 Brigade. The First Support Brigade attempted to negotiate with Zeidan's captors, however ultimately Zeidan was freed after the 106 Brigade and local residents stormed the building. By the time of his release, Zeidan had been held for less than six hours.

== Aftermath ==
The kidnapping was condemned by the US, UK, France, and the UN, who all also pledged their support for Libya's transition to democracy.

Following Zeidan's release the Libyan Government released a statement blaming the kidnapping on two groups of ex-rebels; the Operations Cell of Libyan Revolutionaries and Counter Crime Agency.

Despite having claimed earlier responsibility for the kidnapping, following Zeidan's release the group denied having played any role in the kidnapping, and claimed that any statements to the contrary in the media were untrue.

At a press conference later the same day GNC President Nouri Abusahmain claimed responsibility for establishing the Libyan Revolutionaries Operations Room in July 2013, claiming he had done so in order to protect Tripoli and various state institutions. Abusahmain denied however that LROR was acting under any orders from him.

A source in the Attorney General's Office revealed to Libya Herald on 10 October that Abdelmonem Al-Said, the head of the Counter Crime Agency in Tripoli's Fornaj district, was under investigation by the Attorney General for his role in the kidnapping of Zeidan. The source also claimed that the arrest warrant supposedly signed by the Attorney General was a forgery, and that several other security officials were believed to have been aware of the planned kidnapping in the week leading up to it, but had not acted.

=== Accusations of guilt ===
In a TV address to the nation on 11 October, Zeidan called the incident an attempted coup d'état, and blamed it on an unnamed political party in the GNC. Zeidan claimed that the party had previously failed to rally enough votes in the GNC to dismiss Zeidan from his post of Prime Minister by constitutional means, and so had instead resorted to force. Zeidan also vowed a strong response to his kidnappers, and signaled the possibility of an imminent crackdown by the Libyan Government. Zeidan also stated that a crisis committee, including revolutionaries, had been formed, and that previously delayed funds for police and security forces were now being dispensed by the Central Bank of Libya. Zeidan also denied that Nouri Abusahmain, the President of the GNC, had played any role in the kidnapping.

At a press conference on the afternoon of 20 October, Zeidan named several of those he accused as responsible for his kidnapping. Zeidan claimed that Mustafa Treiki and Mohamed al-Kilani, both of whom are Independent members of the General National Congress for Zawiya, were the political leadership behind the kidnapping. Kilani in particular is regarded as being a radical Islamist. During the Libyan Civil War both Kilani and Treiki had served in a rebel brigade known as the Zawiya Martyrs Brigade, with Kilani serving as the brigades commander whilst Treiki had been a leading member. The two have been considered close to the Libyan Islamic Fighting Group, although neither are members. Kilani had also previously been a key figure in the GNC who had pushed for the storming of Bani Walid in October 2012, and had also served in a military capacity during the siege.

Others named by Zeidan included Abdul Hakkim Belazi; the official spokesman for the Counter Crime Agency, and a man named Ramadan Zaamit. Zeidan also claimed that whilst he was being detained at the Counter Crime Agency building on Fornaj he was interrogated by Abdelmonem Al-Said; the local head of the CCA, as well as by Adel Al-Said and Abdulraouf Al-Minae.

Zeidan also claimed that his mobile phone had been taken during his detention, but that his service provider had helped recover it. The phone was eventually found on GNC premises, where it had been taken by one of Zeidan's kidnappers.

=== Response by alleged kidnappers ===
Treiki and Kilani in turn called a press conference for the evening of the 20 October to respond to Zeidan's claims, which they denied, calling Zeidan a "liar." Instead they claimed Zeidan was attempting to blame them in order to distract from his own failures, and claimed Zeidan was trying to emerge from the incident as a hero. Treiki and Kilani did however admit to having previously unsuccessfully attempted to organise a vote of no confidence in the GNC in order to topple Zeidan's Government.

Sharing the platform with Treiki and Kilani at the press conference was Abdelmonem al-Said (the commander of the CCA Fornaj unit). In contrast to Treiki and Kilani's denials of responsibility, al-Said claimed he was proud of having arrested Zeidan, and accused Zeidan of involvements in drugs and corruption. Said also claimed that drugs had been found in Zeidan's car some months prior, in June 2013, and that there was no evidence that Zeidan enjoyed any kind of political immunity from arrest and prosecution.

GNC members are entitled to immunity, meaning that no investigation or prosecution of a GNC member can take place until their immunity has been removed. The GNC can however vote to remove immunity from sitting members, such as in early October 2013 when immunity was removed from several GNC member's accused of defaming members of the Justice & Construction party.

=== Reactions ===
==== Domestic ====
Justice and Construction Party - In a speech responding to the kidnapping, Mohamed Sowan; the head of the Justice and Construction Party, called for Zeidan's resignation. Sawan accused Zeidan of mismanagement, and claimed that this was the real reason for the kidnapping. Sawan also claimed the GNC was looking to replace Zeidan, although criticized the kidnapping as "irresponsible behavior." Sawan also denied that Zeidan had been referring to the Justice and Construction Party when he referenced to an unnamed political party being behind the attempted coup. Sawan had in September demanded Zeidan's removal by means of a no-confidence motion, and blamed Zeidan for all of Libya's problems. Sawan had never spoken openly about withdrawing the Justice and Construction Party's 5 Ministers from the Government. There were reports that the Justice and Construction Party had failed in an attempt to gather the 120 votes needed to dismiss Zeidan from his office, and so had instead offered a truce.

Zintan Local Council - On 10 October the Council issued a call for all those involved in Prime Minister Zeidan's kidnapping to be arrested and punished. The Council also blamed the GNC and GNC President Nouri Abusahmain for establishing the Libyan Revolutionaries Operations Room.
