= Battle of Tripoli Airport =

2014 battle of the Second Libyan Civil War

- Part of the Second Libyan Civil War
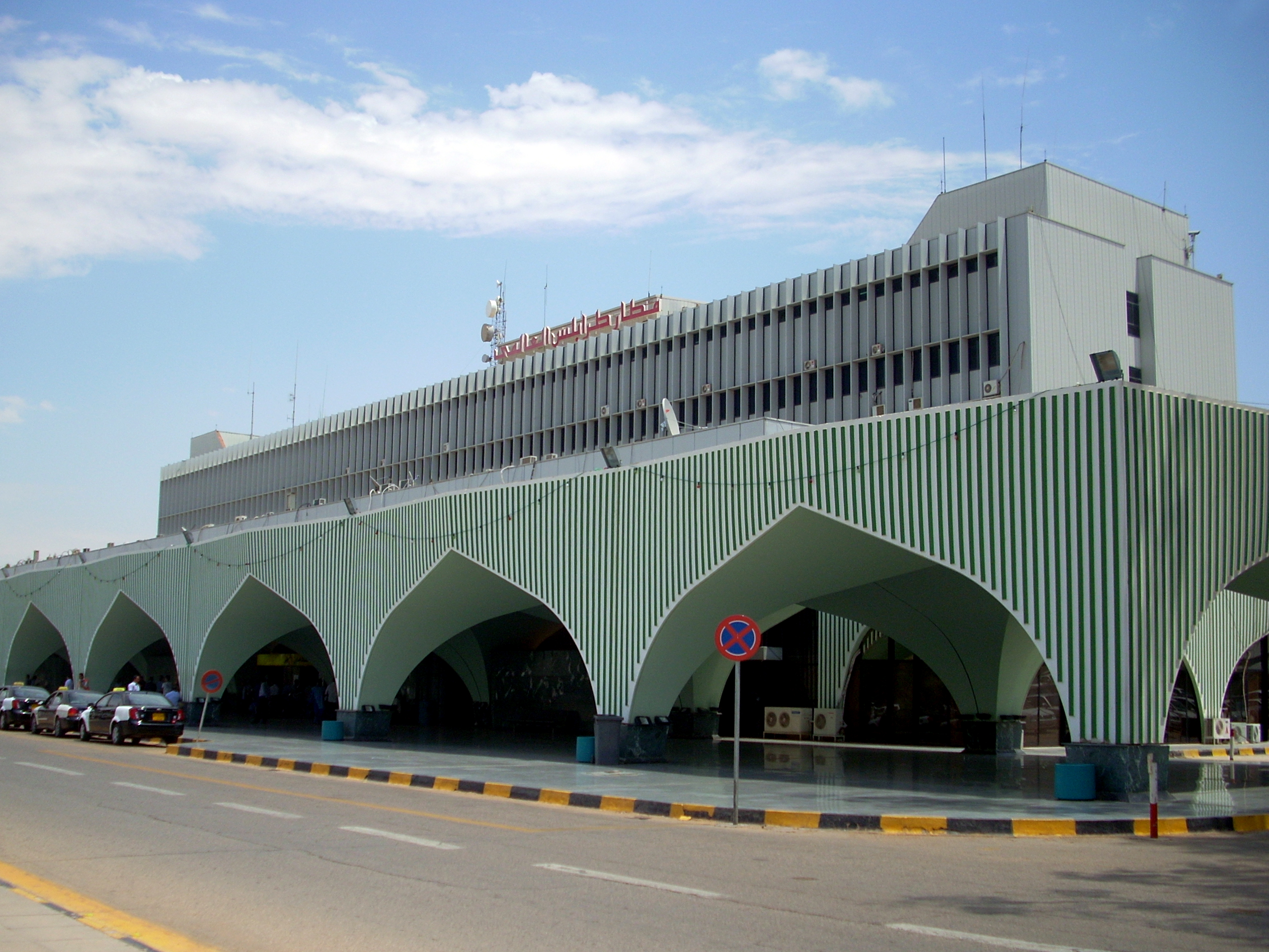
- Tripoli International Airport
Date	13 July – 23 August 2014 (1 month, 1 week and 3 days)
Location	Tripoli International Airport, Libya
Result	Libya Dawn victory: Zintani forces and their allies withdraw on orders of House of Representatives; Islamist armed groups take control of the airport; Airport now unused

Belligerents
(Libya) Zintani brigades; (Libya) Al-Qaqa battalion; (Libya) Al Sawa'iq battalion; (Libya) Warshefana battalions; Zintani Airport Security; Supported by: Egypt; United Arab Emirates; (Libya) Libyan National Army	Libya Dawn coalition; Libya Revolutionaries Operations Room; (Libya) Central Shield Misrata brigades; (Libya) Al Somoud Battalion; (Libya) Ghnewa Al Kikli Battalion; (Libya) Al Qabra Battalion; Ansar al-Sharia (Libya); LIFG; Supported by: Qatar

Commanders and leaders
	Nouri Abusahmain (President of the GNC, disputed); Sadiq Al-Ghariani (Grand Mufti); Mohammed Hadia (Operation Libya Dawn Commander) Shaaban Hadia (LROR Commander)

The Battle of Tripoli Airport was a major event that took place during the Second Libyan Civil War. It began on 13 July 2014 as part of a series of operations, dubbed "Libya Dawn" or " فجر ليبيا", conducted by a coalition of Islamist militias who led a coup d'état operation against the House of Representatives (Libya), following the 2014 Libyan parliamentary election, to recapture the airport and political institutions to gain control of the capital Tripoli. The battle ended in August 2014 with the capture of the airport and ultimately its destruction. The battle was fought between an Islamist New General National Congress and the Zintani brigades.

== Background ==
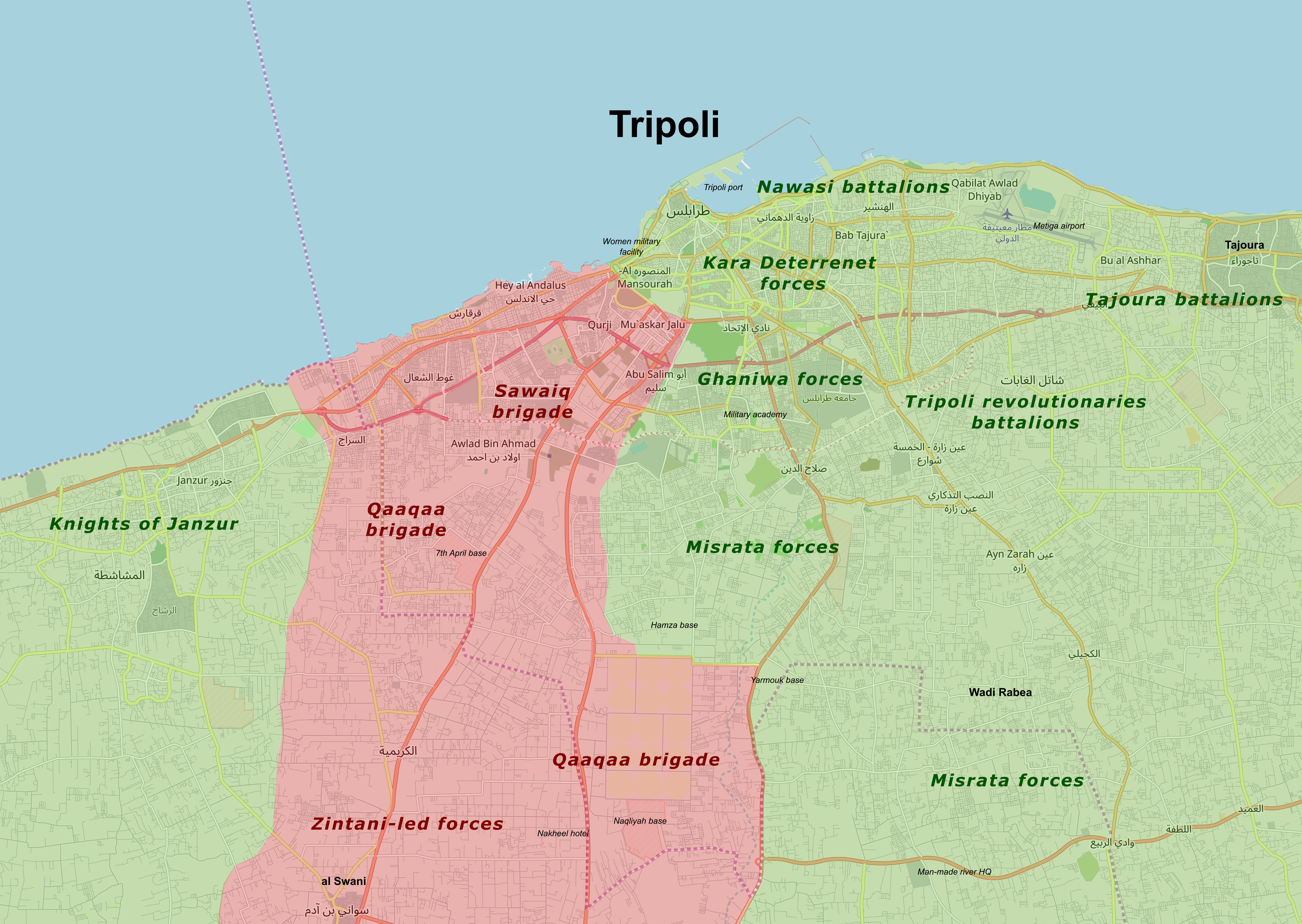
Situation in Tripoli mid June 2014; airport is further south

The Zintani Brigades had provided security for Tripoli International Airport since the 2011 War which overthrew Gadhafi.

After the defeat of Islamist politicians in the 2014 Libyan parliamentary election, the Libya Revolutionaries Operations Room and Misrata Brigades were faced with a largely anti-Islamist parliament. Their most powerful political ally, Nouri Abusahmain, was faced with an imminent loss of power, and they were likely to lose funding from the General National Congress. The anti-Islamist politicians who won the 2014 elections had previously tried to disband the Libya Revolutionaries Operations Room due to its attempted coup in 2013, and were able to do so after the election results.

== Combatants ==
The New General National Congress coalition, dubbed operation Libya Dawn was composed of the Libya Revolutionaries Operations Room included the following groups:

- Misrata's Al Somood battalion led by Salah Badi
- Ghnewa battalion led by Abdul Ghani Al-Kikli,
- Al-Qabra battalion led by Suleiman Al Shatwan.
- Supported by Qatari and Turkish military training, Intelligence and arms support.

The Zintani-led brigades consisted of the following groups:

- Al-Qaqa battalion led by Maj.Gen. Othman Al Mulaitaqa
- Al-Sawa'iq battalion led by Imad Mustafa Traboulsi
- Members of Warshefana battalions.
- Received materiel and Air support from the Libyan National Army

== Events ==
On 13 July, the Libya Dawn coalition launched their operation to seize the airport. Many aircraft were destroyed on the ground. The operation received public support from Grand Mufti Sadiq Al-Ghariani.

On 23 August 2014, Zintani forces withdrew from the airport. They claimed that they withdrew because they had been instructed to do so by the parliament. This was later confirmed by parliamentary sources.

== Aftermath ==
In the immediate aftermath of the battle, large fires, and plumes of smoke arose from 4 large kerosene fuel containers that were struck by rocket attacks, polluting the surrounding grounds and the air quality. Roads infrastructure on the exterior of the airport facility was damaged as well as inside the airport with mortar explosions and shrapnel. Residential areas near to the airport were also damaged in the fighting, as some residences were used in the fighting as firing positions by all involved parties. Residential areas surrounding the airport were also damaged during the battle, mostly from light weapons 7.62x32, heavy weapons damage from ZU-23-2 projectiles, RPG-7 and on rare occasions larger damage from T-72 rounds. There have been reports of violations against civilians, and GRAD rocket systems being used on civilian residential areas, with civilians caught in the crossfire despite many of them being displaced.

The airport main reception and customs building succumbed to catastrophic fire damage after an intense assault was launched by Islamist Libya Dawn and Al Somood militias to capture the facility during the final days of the battle which resulted in the defending Zintani forces withdrawing from the airport. The entirety of the interior of the reception building that housed offices and processing areas, containing flammable materials completely burned off, rendering the mail building unusable.

The assault on the airport and deteriorating security in Libya, prompted UN agencies to relocate its staff to neighboring countries. UNSMIL "United Nations Support Mission in Libya" to condemn the violence and the destruction of Civilian infrastructure., resulting in the UN to reiterate its support for a civilian government within Libya and strongly condemned attacks on civilians and infrastructure by adapting resolution 2174 (2014), including later placing sanctions on Salah Badi in 2018 for his roles in the assault on Tripoli Airport.

More than 20 civilian aircraft were damaged or destroyed, of which 13 belonged to Afriqiyah Airways and 7 belonged to Lufthansa. The Airport's air traffic control tower, radar, four major fuel storage containers, main customs and reception building and terminals were destroyed.

On August 6, 2014, Amnesty International, UNSMIL and OHCHR reported a civilian death toll of 214 and 981 injured due to indiscriminate shelling and violence inflicted by militias.OHCHR and UNSMIL reported that:

UNSMIL believes that the casualty figures are an underestimate of the actual situation. ...Libyan health officials do not distinguish between fighters and civilians in issuing casualty figures, which makes it difficult to track the number of civilians killed in the conflict. This challenge is exacerbated because armed group members do not usually wear recognizable uniforms or carry distinctive insignia.

Financial losses suffered by the Airline Sector in Libya were roughly estimated to be around $3.5 billion for the destroyed aircraft alone, in addition to huge sums in damage incurred on the airport facility amounting to an estimated $US 70 million dollars for 90% of the facility's destruction. Libyan Airlines a state owned company reported that its losses amounted to $US 200 million reported by its Manager, Ahmed Al Qadiri in a Statement to The New Arab news agency.

On July 13, 2014, The Zintani forces within the airport withdrew on Orders from the parliament thus ending the battle at the airport.

On September 8, 2014, Human rights watch released a statement condemning violence by both main Militia parties and stated that actions taken by Militias may amount to war crimes.

By April 2019, the non-functional Tripoli international Airport was captured by the Libyan National Army and is used as a strategic staging ground for the LNA operation against Libya Dawn Islamist in Tripoli.

The airport changed hands when Libya's UN-backed Government of National Accord (GNA) declared itself in full control of Tripoli after recapturing the capital's airport on 4 June 2020 with intensified military support from Turkish government forces, who drove Gen Haftar's forces back from the frontlines.
