= Amal Bayou =

Libyan microbiologist and politician (died 2017)

- أمل بايو

Member of the House of Representatives for Benghazi
- In office 4 August 2014 – 24 October 2017

Personal details
- Born: 1957–1959
- Died: 24 October 2017 (aged 58–60)
- Party: Independent

Amal Bayou (Arabic: أمل بايو, romanized: 'amal bayu; c. 1957/1959 – 24 October 2017) was a Libyan microbiologist and politician who served in the House of Representatives from 2014 until her death in 2017. Bayou was a prominent advocate for women's rights and social change in Libya, and was considered to be an "extremely popular" politician in the country.

== Biography ==
Amal Bayou was born between 1957 and 1959. She received a doctoral degree in microbiology from a university in Germany, and spent "a long time" in the country. At some point, Bayou returned to Libya, becoming a professor of microbiology at the University of Benghazi in 1995; she held this position until her death in 2017.

In the 2014 Libyan parliamentary election, Bayou was elected to the Libyan House of Representatives, representing one of Benghazi's reserved seats for women. Bayou received 14,086 votes, the third highest vote-count in the entire election. The House of Representatives, which was one of two major factions in the Second Libyan Civil War – fighting against the Government of National Accord – controlled eastern Libya and met in the city of Benghazi. Bayou was a supporter of keeping the de facto capital in Benghazi, as she stated that the local militias would protect the House of Representatives similar to how they protected the National Transitional Council during the 2011 civil war. However, after her nephew was killed during a missile strike on the city in early 2015, Bayou joined the rest of the House of Representatives in fleeing to the eastern port city of Tobruk.

Considered to be "extremely popular", Bayou was a strong critic of the power-structures in Libya during her tenure. A staunch opponent of Abdullah al-Thani, the House of Representatives-backed claimant for the prime ministership of Libya, she disputed claims that he was the victim of an assassination attempt in 2015, alleging that it was a "farce in an attempt to whitewash [him]". Later in 2015, when al-Thani offered his resignation to the House of Representatives due to the worsening situation in the country, Bayou stated that his government was weak and had been a "failure", and that he was "incompetent". She also criticized Sadiq Al-Ghariani, the grand mufti of Libya, whom the House of Representatives accused of supporting Islamist militias and terrorist groups; Bayou stated that "the parliament will not hesitate to take decisive measures towards the mufti".

Throughout her life, Bayou supported "various social and political initiatives", and was a prominent advocate for women's rights in the country. One of 32 women elected to the House of Representatives in 2014, Bayou was a proponent for reserved seats for women in parliament, stating: "I was initially opposed to the introduction of a women's quota in the national elections. But now I think it is necessary. Libyan society is simply not yet ready for equality". She also criticized the slow-progress in advancing women's rights in the country following the Libyan Revolution, and stated that women were still being considered "second-class citizens". In 2015, she spoke at a conference held by the European Parliament Committee on Women's Rights and Gender Equality, discussing "challenges and opportunities in women's political participation". Bayou also provided aid to families whose relatives had been killed or were went missing during the Libyan Crisis, and co-founded a youth initiative called "Youth of Benghazi Libya".

Bayou died of cancer on 24 October 2017, and she is buried in the Hawari cemetery. Following her death, members of the House of Representatives from across the political spectrum offered condolences. The Libya Herald wrote that her death "robs [the House of Representatives] of an active campaigner who tried to promote compromise between the different factions, notably between those who boycotted the House of Representatives and those who joined in". As Bayou died in office, a by-election would typically have been called to elect her replacement; however, due to the political situation of Libya, it is unknown if the High National Election Commission was able to organize the by-election.
