= Human rights in Libya =

Human rights in Libya is the record of human rights upheld and violated in various stages of Libya's history. The Kingdom of Libya, from 1951 to 1969, was heavily influenced by the British and Y.R.K companies. Under the King, Libya had a constitution. The kingdom, however, was marked by a feudal regime. Due to the previous colonial regime, Libya had a low literacy rate of 10%, a low life expectancy of 57 years, with many people living in shanties and tents. Illiteracy and homelessness were chronic problems during this era, when iron shacks dotted many urban centres in the country.

From 1969 to 2011, the history of Libya was marked by the Libyan Arab Jamahiriya (where jamahiriya means "state of the masses"), a "direct democracy" political system established by Muammar Gaddafi, who nominally stepped down from power in 1977, but remained an unofficial "Brother Leader" until 2011. The country's literacy rate rose to 90%, and welfare systems were introduced that allowed access to free education and free healthcare. In 2008, the General People's Congress had declared the Great Green Charter of Human Rights of the Jamahiriyan Era. The Great Manmade River was also built to allow free access to fresh water across large parts of the country. As a result, Libya's Human Development Index in 2010 was the highest in Africa and greater than that of Saudi Arabia.

Throughout Gaddafi's rule, international non-governmental organizations routinely characterized Libya's human rights situation as poor, citing systematic abuses such as political repression, restrictions on political freedoms and civil liberties, and arbitrary imprisonment; the American government funded Freedom House's annual Freedom in the World report, consistently giving it a ranking of "Not Free" and gave Libya their lowest possible rating of "7" in their evaluations of civil liberties and political freedoms from 1989 to 2010. Gaddafi also publicly bragged about sending hit squads to assassinate exiled dissidents, and Libyan state media openly announced bounties on the heads of political opponents. Civilians were routinely executed publicly by hanging for simply speaking out against the regime. From 1977 to 1984, an annual festival created by Gaddafi would publicly hang civilians every year on April 7th, the anniversary of the 1976 student protests.

The Gaddafi regime was also accused of the 1996 Abu Salim prison massacre. In 2010, Amnesty International published a critical report on Libya, raising concerns about cases of enforced disappearances and other human rights violations that remained unresolved, and that Internal Security Agency members implicated in those violations continued to operate with impunity. In January 2011, the United Nations Human Rights Council published a report analysing the Libyan Arab Jamahiriya's human rights record with input from member nations, most of which (including many European and most Asian, African and South American nations) generally praised the country's progressive efforts in human rights, though some (particularly Australia, France, Israel, Switzerland, and the United States) raised concerns about human rights abuses concerning cases of disappearance and torture, and restrictions on free press and free association; Libya agreed to investigate cases involving disappearance and torture, and to repeal any laws criminalizing political expression or restricting a free independent press, and affirmed that it had an independent judiciary.

== Libya under Gaddafi ==
=== Revolutionary Committees ===
In the early 1970s, Gaddafi created the Revolutionary Committees as conduits for raising political consciousness, with the aim of direct political participation by all Libyans. In 1979, however, some of these committees had eventually evolved into self-appointed, sometimes zealous, enforcers of revolutionary orthodoxy. During the early 1980s, these committees had considerable power and became a growing source of tension within the Jamahiriya, to the extent that Gaddafi sometimes criticized their effectiveness and excessive repression, until the power of the Revolutionary Committees was eventually restricted in the late 1980s.

The Revolutionary Committees had been resembling similar systems in totalitarian countries; reportedly, 10 to 20 percent of Libyans worked in surveillance for these committees, a proportion of informants on par with Ba'athist Iraq under Saddam Hussein or Juche Korea under Kim Jong Il, with surveillance taking place in government, in factories, and in the education sector. They also posted bounties for the killing of Libyan critics charged with treason abroad. Opposition activists were occasionally executed publicly and the executions were rebroadcast on public television channels.

In 1988, Gaddafi criticized the excessive measures taken by the Revolutionary Councils, stating that "they deviated, harmed, tortured" and that "the true revolutionary does not practise repression." That same year, the Libyan Arab Jamahiriya issued the Great Green Document on Human Rights, in which Article 5 established laws that allowed greater freedom of expression. Article 8 of The Code on the Promotion of Freedom stated that "each citizen has the right to express his opinions and ideas openly in People’s Congresses and in all mass media." A number of restrictions were also placed on the power of the Revolutionary Committees, leading to a resurgence in the Libyan state's popularity by the early 1990s. In 2004, however, Libya posted a $1 million bounty for journalist Ashur Shamis, under the allegation that he was linked to Al-Qaeda and terror suspect Abu Qatada.

=== Foreign languages and migrant workers ===
Until 1998, foreign languages were not part of the school curriculum. One protester in 2011 described the situation as: "None of us can speak English or French. He kept us ignorant and blindfolded". The US State Department claimed that ethnic, Islamic fundamentalist and tribal minorities suffer discrimination, and that the state continues to restrict the labour rights of foreign workers. In 1998, CERD expressed concern about alleged "acts of discrimination against migrant workers on the basis of their national or ethnic origin", which the United Nations Human Rights Council also expressed concern about in 2010. Human Rights Watch in September 2006 documented how migrant workers and other foreigners were subjected to human rights abuses, which have increased drastically against black Africans under the National Transitional Council following the Libyan Civil War.

=== Criticism of allegations ===
The Libyan Arab Jamahiriya rejected the allegations against the country. They pointed to how their country is founded on direct people's democracy that guaranteed direct exercise of authority by all citizens through the people's congresses. Citizens were able to express opinions of the congresses on issues related to political, economic, social, and cultural issues. In addition, there were information platforms such as newspapers and TV channels for people to express their opinions through. Libyan authorities also argued that no one in the Libyan Arab Jamahiriya suffered from extreme poverty and hunger, and that the government guaranteed a minimum of food and essential needs to people with low incomes. In 2006, an initiative was adopted for providing people with low incomes investment portfolios amounting to $30,000 to be deposited with banks and companies.

=== HIV trial ===
The HIV trial in Libya (or Bulgarian nurses affair) concerns the trials, appeals and eventual release of six foreign medical workers charged with conspiring to deliberately infect over 400 children with HIV-tainted blood in 1998, causing an epidemic at El-Fatih Children's Hospital in Benghazi. On 6 May 2004, a Libyan court sentenced the workers to death. They were eventually remanded to Bulgarian custody in 2007, and subsequently pardoned. The Libyan government filed complaints about the matter with the Arab League before the government's overthrow in 2011.

=== Abu Salim Prison massacre ===
In 2006, Amnesty International called for an independent inquiry into unconfirmed deaths that occurred in Abu Salim maximum security prison during the 1996 riot. In 2009, Human Rights Watch believes that 1,270 prisoners were killed. However, Human Rights Watch states that they were unable to independently verify the allegations. The claims cited by Human Rights Watch are based on the testimony of a single former inmate, Hussein Al Shafa’i, who stated that he did not witness a prisoner being killed: "I could not see the dead prisoners who were shot..."

The figure of 1200 killed was arrived at by Al Shafa’i allegedly calculating the number of meals he prepared when he was working in the prison's kitchen. At the same time, Al Shafa'i stated "I was asked by the prison guards to wash the watches that were taken from the bodies of the dead prisoners..." Al Shafa’i lives in the United States, where he applied for asylum, Hussein al-Shafa'i said he entered Abu Salim from 1988 to 2000 on political charges.

The Libyan Government rejected the allegations about Abu Salim. In May 2005, the Internal Security Agency head of the Great Socialist People's Libyan Arab Jamahiriya told Human Rights Watch that the prisoners captured some guards and stole weapons from the prison cache. The prisoners and guards died as security personnel tried to restore order, and the government opened an investigation on the order of the Minister of Justice. The Libyan official stated that more than 400 prisoners escaped Abu Salim in four separate break-outs prior to and after the incident: in July 1995, December 1995, June 1996 and July 2001. Among the escapees were men who then fought with Islamist militant groups in Afghanistan, Iran, and Iraq.

In 2009, the Libyan government stated that the killings took place amid confrontation between the government and rebels from the Libyan Islamic Fighting Group, and that some 200 guards were killed as well. In August 2009, several were granted amnesty by the government. Those released included 45 members of the Libyan Islamic Fighting Group (LIFG), most of whom had been in prison since the mid-1990s after being sentenced in unfair trials for an attempt to overthrow then-jamahiriya leader Muammar Gaddafi. The releases came after the group renounced violence in August 2009. Authorities at Abu Salim prison also released 43 "members of other jihadist groups," a press release said.

In January 2011, the Libyan Arab Jamahiriya confirmed that it was carrying out an investigation into the incident along with international investigators.

The Libyan insurgents claimed that 1270 people were buried at a supposed mass grave they discovered. However, investigators from CNN and other organizations found only what appeared to be animal bones at the site.

=== Torture ===
In January 2011, the Libyan Arab Jamahiriya stated that the practice of torture and ill treatment was forbidden in article 434 of the Penal Code, which stated that public officials who had ordered the torture of a person or had committed an act of torture were sentenced to 3 to 10 years' imprisonment. Gaddafi openly condemned the use of torture, as a criticism against several Revolutionary Committees that had condoned the use of torture.

Torture was allegedly used by Libya's security forces to punish rebels, as well as civilians, after the rebellion hit north west Libya during the civil war. Gaddafi troops were responsible for the deaths of many Libyans, such as in the Yarmuk massacre, where 124 civilians were tortured, raped, murdered, and burnt.

== Civil war ==
Various states and supranational bodies have condemned the use of military and mercenaries against Libyan civilians during the Libyan Civil War, an allegation that Saif al-Islam Gaddafi denies.

After an emergency meeting on 22 February, the Arab League suspended Libya from taking part in council meetings and Moussa issued a statement condemning the "crimes against the current peaceful popular protests and demonstrations in several Libyan cities." Libya was suspended from the UN Human Rights Council by United Nations General Assembly Resolution 65/265, which was adopted by consensus and cited the Gaddafi government's use of violence against protesters. A number of governments, including Britain, Canada, Switzerland, the United States, Germany and Australia took action to freeze assets of Gaddafi and his associates. The move was criticised as double-standard as numerous similar human right abuses in Bahrain, Yemen or elsewhere produced no action at all.

Luis Moreno Ocampo, chief prosecutor of the International Criminal Court, estimated that between 500 and 700 people were killed by Gaddafi's security forces in February 2011, before the rebels even took up arms. "Shooting at protestors was systematic," Moreno-Ocampo stated, discussing the Libyan government's response to the initial pro-democracy demonstrations.

Moreno-Ocampo further stated that during the ongoing civil war, "War crimes are apparently committed as a matter of policy" by forces loyal to Gaddafi. This is further supported by claims of Human Rights Watch, that 10 protesters, who had already agreed to lay down arms, were executed by a government paramilitary group in Bani Walid in May.

On 26 February 2011, the United Nations Security Council voted unanimously in a resolution to impose strict sanctions, including targeted travel bans, against Gaddafi's government, as well as to refer Gaddafi and other members of his regime to the International Criminal Court for investigation into allegations of brutality against civilians, which could constitute crimes against humanity in violation of international law. There are many reports of these sanctions being broken where support against Libyan government forces is the case.

Rebel forces have been criticized for a number of human rights violations, with some being accused of being responsible for the torture and killing of African Mercenaries who were targeting civilians in Misrata, Benghazi, and Zawiyah.

According to the Amnesty investigation, the number of casualties was heavily exaggerated, and that "some of the protesters may have been armed," "there is no proof of mass killing of civilians on the scale of Syria or Yemen," and "there is no evidence that aircraft or heavy anti-aircraft machine guns were used against crowds." It also doubted claims from the media that the protest movement was "entirely peaceful" and "presented no security challenge."

However, in a later report from Amnesty International it was found that "al-Gaddafi forces committed serious violations of international humanitarian law (IHL), including war crimes, and gross human rights violations, which point to the commission of crimes against humanity. They deliberately killed and injured scores of unarmed protesters; subjected perceived opponents and critics to enforced disappearance and torture and other ill- treatment; and arbitrarily detained scores of civilians. They launched indiscriminate attacks and attacks targeting civilians in their efforts to regain control of Misrata and territory in the east. They launched artillery, mortar and rocket attacks against residential areas. They used inherently indiscriminate weapons such as anti-personnel land mines and cluster bombs, including in residential areas."

In July 2011, Saif al-Islam Gaddafi had an interview with Russia Today, where he denied the ICC's allegations that he or his father Muammar Gaddafi ordered the killing of civilian protesters. He pointed out that he is not a member of the government or the military, and therefore has no authority to give such orders. According to Saif, he made recorded calls to General Abdul Fatah Younis, who later defected to the rebel forces, in order to request not to use force against protesters, to which Fatah responded that they are attacking a military site, where surprised guards fired in self-defense.

In August 2011, Physicians for Human Rights released a report documenting severe violations of human rights and evidence of war crimes and possible crimes against humanity in Misrata. In December 2011, PHR released another report documenting evidence of a massacre at a warehouse in Tripoli in which soldiers of Khamis Qaddafi’s 32nd Brigade unlawfully detained, raped, tortured and executed at least 53 detainees. PHR’s medico-legal investigation and resulting report provided the first comprehensive account of the 32nd Brigade massacre, and provided forensic evidence needed to secure accountability for crimes according to international legal standards.

In January 2012, independent human rights groups published a report describing the human rights violations committed by all sides, including NATO, anti-Gaddafi forces, and pro-Gaddafi forces. The same report also accused NATO of war crimes. During and after the war, the National Transitional Council implemented a new Law 37, restricting freedom of speech, where any praise of glorification of Gaddafi or the previous government is punishable with imprisonment, with sentences ranging from three to fifteen years. The law was eventually revoked in June 2012.

According to Human Rights Watch annual report 2016, journalists are still being targeted by the armed groups in Libya. One of the victims was Muftah Al-Qatrani, who worked for media production company, he was killed in Benghazi in April 2015. In other case, the fate of two Tunisian journalist, Sofiane Chourabi and Nadhir Ktari, is still unknown since September 2014. Later, in April 2015, Groups affiliated with ISIS claimed the responsibility of killing them. In November 2015, the NGO Reporters Without Borders (RSF) claimed that journalists in Libya were targeted in 31 incidents during 2015. The organization added that Libya has very low rank in the 2015 press freedom index as it occupied 154 out of 180 countries.

August 2016, Euro-Mediterranean Human Rights Monitor warned from the illicit spreading of weapons among Libyan population. According to the monitor, dozens of loosely formed, armed groups have formed, which makes a "chaos of weapons". The spreading of weapons represents a major obstacle to the reconstruction of Libya. It is also paves the way to murder, drug, arm trafficking and kidnapping. The monitor calls central authorities in Libya to act urgently, with the UN support to put an end to this chaos.

December 2016, Euro-Mediterranean Human Rights Monitor issued a report regarding the violation of human rights in Libya. According to the report, since July 2014, Ganfoda has been besieged by Khalifa Haftar’s Libyan National Army forces; the civilian has suffered long-month power cut, resulting in shortage of food, water, and medicine. As the civilians have been prevented from access to food and medical aid, more than 170 families were evacuated, yet the children are being used as bait by the Libyan army forces in order to prevent their families fleeing away to use them as a part of their militant operations. They are, therefore, at risk of detention and prolonged investigation, in case of attempting to cross the checkpoints. It also showed ambulance crews cannot enter the town due to ground and air attacks; and the Libyan Red Crescent Society cannot provide any humanitarian relief for the people.

On September 21, 2020, the European Union Council imposed sanctions on three companies and two people, which were responsible for human rights abuses in Libya and violated the UN arms embargo. The sanctions consisted of asset freeze and a travel ban for persons, and asset freeze for the companies.

On 25 July 2022, Martha Ama Akyaa Pobee, UN Assistant Secretary-General for political affairs and peace operations stated that the overall situation in Libya remains “highly volatile”, while clashes in and around Tripoli surged. Frustrated Libyans demonstrated over the lack of progress on elections and poor State services, prolonging tensions and fuelling insecurity.

The Libya Crimes Watch Organization monitors the human rights situation in Libya, and interacts with violations daily by publishing on its Facebook and Twitter platforms, as well as publishing data on the website and monthly reports summarizing the human rights violations that have been monitored and documented throughout Libya.

== Women's rights ==
As in many modern revolutions, women played a major role in the 2011 Libyan Revolution. After the revolution, concerns were raised by human rights groups about attempts to sideline women in Libya's political and economic environments as well as a lack of strong protections for women's rights in the new constitution.

GNC opponents argue that it supported Islamist actions against women. Sadiq Ghariani, the Grand Mufti of Libya, is perceived to be linked closely to Islamist parties. He has issued fatwas ordering Muslims to obey the GNC, and fatwas ordering Muslims to fight against Haftar's forces.

Later in 2013, lawyer Hamida al-Hadi al-Asfar, advocate of women's rights, was abducted, tortured and killed. It is alleged she was targeted for criticising the Grand Mufti's declaration. No arrests were made.

In June 2013, two politicians, Ali Tekbali and Fathi Sager, appeared in court for "insulting Islam" for publishing a cartoon promoting women's rights. Under sharia law they were facing a possible death penalty. The case caused widespread concern although they were eventually acquitted in March 2014. The GNC yielded to pressure for organising new elections, voting 124 out of 133 in favour of a new Electoral Law on 30 March 2014. In the 25 June 2014 elections, Ali Tekbali was elected to the new House of Representatives in the seat of Tripoli Central, with 4777 votes. Out of 200 seats, Article 16 of the Electoral Laws reserved 30 seats for women.

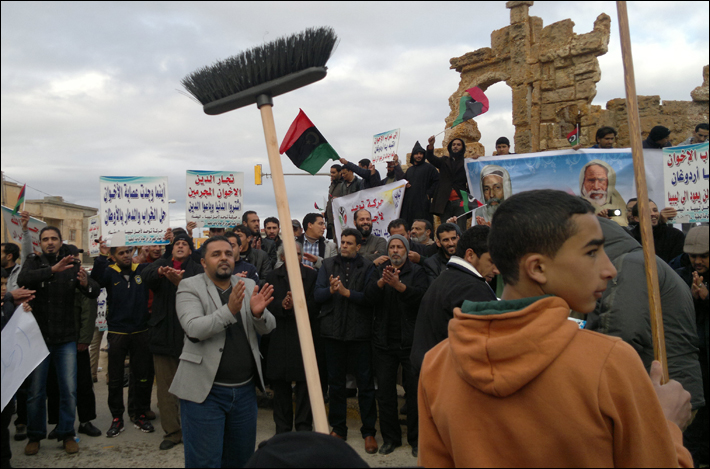
Protesters stage a large demonstration in Shahat against the GNC's mandate extension plan.

During Nouri Abusahmain's presidency of the GNC and subsequent to GNC's decision to enforce sharia law in December 2013, gender segregation and compulsory hijab were being imposed in Libyan universities from early 2014, provoking strong criticism from women's rights groups.

On 17 July 2020, Amnesty International urged the Libyan National Army to reveal the whereabouts of Siham Sergiwa, a Libyan politician and women’s rights defender who was violently abducted from her home a year ago.

== Slavery ==
19th-century caravan routes in Libya

Slavery in Libya has a long history and a lasting impact on the Libyan culture. It is closely connected with the wider context of slavery in North Africa and trans-Saharan slave trade.

Since ancient history, the territory of modern Libya was a transit area for the slave trade from Sub-Saharan Africa across the Sahara desert to the Mediterranean Sea. The Trans-Saharan slave trade was known from antiquity and continued until the 20th century. Slavery in Ottoman Libya was nominally prohibited in the 19th century, but the abolition laws were not enforced.

During the Italian colonial period (1912–1951) the slavery and slave trade was finally suppressed in practice. Abolition was, however, a gradual and slow process, and the institution of slavery continued long into the colonial period, particularly in the interior desert areas, where the Italian control was weak. The Trans-Saharan slave trade in the interior of Libya was still in operation as late as the 1930s.

In the 21st century, after the killing of Muammar Gaddafi, the Libyan slave trade of Africans across the Sahara resumed, with open-air slave markets reported in a number of cities in Libya, including the capital city, Tripoli.

== Capital punishment ==
Capital punishment in Libya remains a legal practice in the region and is implemented in both civil and military law. Libyan law states that every person sentenced to death will be executed by a firing squad. It was commonly used by the government of Muammar Gaddafi (who was himself ultimately summarily executed). However, the application of the death penalty in Libya has been inconsistent due to political uncertainty and conflict starting in 2011. The death penalty makes up more than 30 articles of Libya's penal code, providing a wide array of offenses punishable by death, including some that are related to freedom of speech and association.

== Libyan coastguard's violation of migrants' rights ==
The Euro‑Med Human Rights Monitor published a report condemning the Libyan coastguard officers’ whipping of a group of migrants rescued near Libya’s Sabratha. In September 2014, nearly 450 migrants drowned in the Mediterranean. In 2016, more than 4,578 migrants drowned there, following an agreement between the EU and Turkey and the closure of the Balkan route. According to the report, the migrants smuggled into Libya are subject to human trafficking, torture, forced labour, sexual exploitation, and arbitrary detention through their way. The Libyan forces were caught on video while humiliating migrants, including women and children. Besides, Human Rights Watch documented similar cases in which Libyan coastguard forces assaulted them verbally and physically in July 2016.

According to the United Nations High Commissioner for Refugees figures, as of March 2019, 879 people had been rescued at sea by the Libyan Coast Guard in 10 operations in 2019. Around 6,000 migrants and asylum-seekers are being held in Detention Centres in Libya . More than 3,000 are at risk of getting involved in the fight over Tripoli.

As per the report published by Amnesty International, migrants in Libya’s detention camps faced unabated human rights violations during the first six months of 2021. Diana Eltahawy, Amnesty’s Middle East and North Africa director, was quoted as saying: “The report also highlights the ongoing complicity of European states that have shamefully continued to enable and assist Libyan coastguards in capturing people at sea and forcibly returning them to the hellscape of detention in Libya, despite knowing full well the horrors they will endure.”

On 11 October 2022, the Office of the United Nations High Commissioner for Human Rights (OHCHR) human rights office reported that migrants in Libya were often compelled to accept ‘assisted return’ to their home countries in conditions that may not meet international human rights laws and standards. Additionally, the report finds that many migrants were returned to the same adverse drivers and structural conditions which compelled their movement in the first place, putting them in precarious and vulnerable situations upon their return. Such returns were unlikely to be sustainable from a human rights perspective.

Updates since 2023

Recent data and analyses show the situation has worsened further:

- In 2024 the International Organization for Migration (IOM) reported that the Libyan Coast Guard intercepted and returned more than 21,000 migrants to Libya in that year. Multiple organizations document that migrants and refugees intercepted at sea and returned to Libya are exposed to arbitrary detention, trafficking, forced labour, sexual exploitation and other rights abuses. A 2025 press release from the International Commission of Jurists (ICJ) condemned collective expulsions, arrests, violent attacks and increasing hate-speech against migrants, refugees and asylum-seekers in Libya.

These updates underline that the mix of military, militia, coastguard and state-actors in Libya continues to yield a transit-system for migrants which is rife with abuse, and where European policies of externalisation and cooperation with the Libyan coastguard reinforce a regime of rights violations rather than protection.

== Historical situation ==
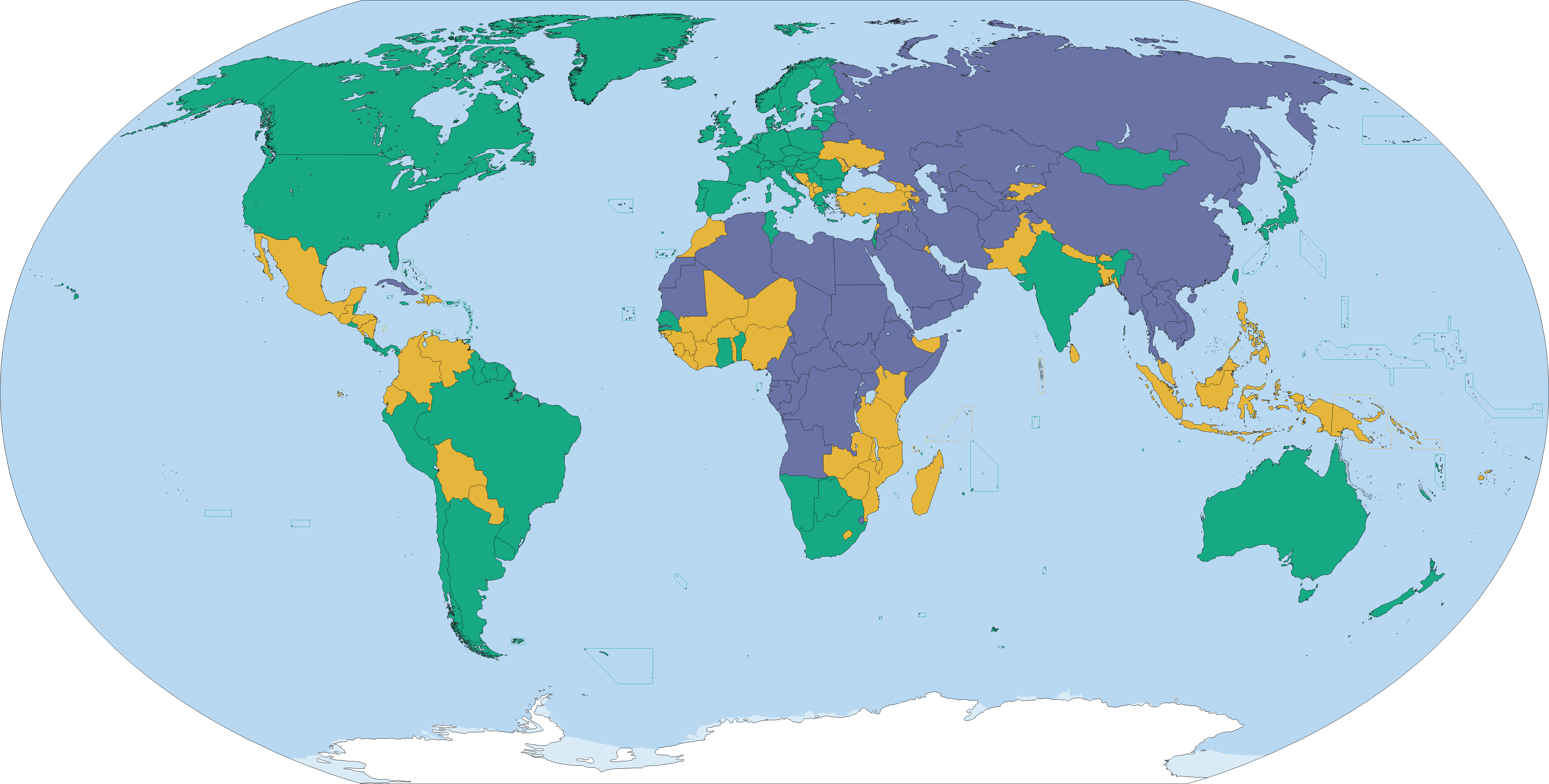
Country ratings from Freedom House's Freedom in the World 2016 survey, concerning the state of world freedom in 2015. Free (86) Partly Free (59) Not Free (50)

The following table shows Libya's ratings since 1972 in the Freedom in the World reports, published annually by the US government-funded Freedom House. A score of 1 is "best"; 7 is "worst".

Historical ratings

Year^{1}	Political Rights	Civil Liberties	Status	Head of State^{2}
1972	7	6	Not Free	Muammar Gaddafi
1973	7	7	Not Free	Muammar Gaddafi
1974	7	7	Not Free	Muammar Gaddafi
1975	7	6	Not Free	Muammar Gaddafi
1976	7	6	Not Free	Muammar Gaddafi
1977	6	6	Not Free	Muammar Gaddafi
1978	6	6	Not Free	Muammar Gaddafi
1979	6	6	Not Free	Muammar Gaddafi
1980	6	7	Not Free	Muammar Gaddafi
1981	6	6	Not Free	Muammar Gaddafi
1982^{3}	6	6	Not Free	Muammar Gaddafi
1983	6	6	Not Free	Muammar Gaddafi
1984	6	6	Not Free	Muammar Gaddafi
1985	6	6	Not Free	Muammar Gaddafi
1986	6	6	Not Free	Muammar Gaddafi
1987	6	6	Not Free	Muammar Gaddafi
1988	6	6	Not Free	Muammar Gaddafi
1989	7	7	Not Free	Muammar Gaddafi
1990	7	7	Not Free	Muammar Gaddafi
1991	7	7	Not Free	Muammar Gaddafi
1992	7	7	Not Free	Muammar Gaddafi
1993	7	7	Not Free	Muammar Gaddafi
1994	7	7	Not Free	Muammar Gaddafi
1995	7	7	Not Free	Muammar Gaddafi
1996	7	7	Not Free	Muammar Gaddafi
1997	7	7	Not Free	Muammar Gaddafi
1998	7	7	Not Free	Muammar Gaddafi
1999	7	7	Not Free	Muammar Gaddafi
2000	7	7	Not Free	Muammar Gaddafi
2001	7	7	Not Free	Muammar Gaddafi
2002	7	7	Not Free	Muammar Gaddafi
2003	7	7	Not Free	Muammar Gaddafi
2004	7	7	Not Free	Muammar Gaddafi
2005	7	7	Not Free	Muammar Gaddafi
2006	7	7	Not Free	Muammar Gaddafi
2007	7	7	Not Free	Muammar Gaddafi
2008	7	7	Not Free	Muammar Gaddafi
2009	7	7	Not Free	Muammar Gaddafi
2010	7	7	Not Free	Muammar Gaddafi
2011	7	6	Not Free	Mustafa Abdul Jalil
2012	4	5	Partly Free	Mohammed Magariaf
2013	4	5	Partly Free	Nouri Abusahmain
2014	6	6	Not Free	Aguila Saleh Issa

== International treaties ==
Libya's stances on international human rights treaties are as follows:

International treaties
Treaty	Organization	Introduced	Signed	Ratified
Convention on the Prevention and Punishment of the Crime of Genocide	United Nations	1948	-	1989
International Convention on the Elimination of All Forms of Racial Discrimination	United Nations	1966	-	1968
International Covenant on Economic, Social and Cultural Rights	United Nations	1966	-	1970
International Covenant on Civil and Political Rights	United Nations	1966	-	1970
First Optional Protocol to the International Covenant on Civil and Political Rights	United Nations	1966	-	1989
Convention on the Non-Applicability of Statutory Limitations to War Crimes and Crimes Against Humanity	United Nations	1968	-	1989
International Convention on the Suppression and Punishment of the Crime of Apartheid	United Nations	1973	-	1976
Convention on the Elimination of All Forms of Discrimination against Women	United Nations	1979	-	1989
Convention against Torture and Other Cruel, Inhuman or Degrading Treatment or Punishment	United Nations	1984	-	1989
Convention on the Rights of the Child	United Nations	1989	-	1993
Second Optional Protocol to the International Covenant on Civil and Political Rights, aiming at the abolition of the death penalty	United Nations	1989	-	-
International Convention on the Protection of the Rights of All Migrant Workers and Members of Their Families	United Nations	1990	-	2004
Optional Protocol to the Convention on the Elimination of All Forms of Discrimination against Women	United Nations	1999	-	2004
Optional Protocol to the Convention on the Rights of the Child on the Involvement of Children in Armed Conflict	United Nations	2000	-	2004
Optional Protocol to the Convention on the Rights of the Child on the Sale of Children, Child Prostitution and Child Pornography	United Nations	2000	-	2004
Convention on the Rights of Persons with Disabilities	United Nations	2006	2008	-
Optional Protocol to the Convention on the Rights of Persons with Disabilities	United Nations	2006	-	-
International Convention for the Protection of All Persons from Enforced Disappearance	United Nations	2006	-	-
Optional Protocol to the International Covenant on Economic, Social and Cultural Rights	United Nations	2008	-	-
Optional Protocol to the Convention on the Rights of the Child on a Communications Procedure	United Nations	2011	-	-

== See also ==
- Al-Gaddafi International Prize for Human Rights
- Detention Centres in Libya
- Health in Libya
- Internet censorship in Libya
- LGBT rights in Libya
- Women in Libya

== Notes ==
1.Note that the "Year" signifies the year the report was issued. The information for the year marked 2009 covers the year 2008, and so on.
2.As of 1 January.
3.The 1982 report covers 1981 and the first half of 1982, and the following 1984 report covers the second half of 1982 and the whole of 1983. In the interest of simplicity, these two aberrant "year and a half" reports have been split into three-year-long reports through interpolation.
