= Exeter Mosque =

Mosque in Devon, England

Exeter Mosque & Cultural Centre
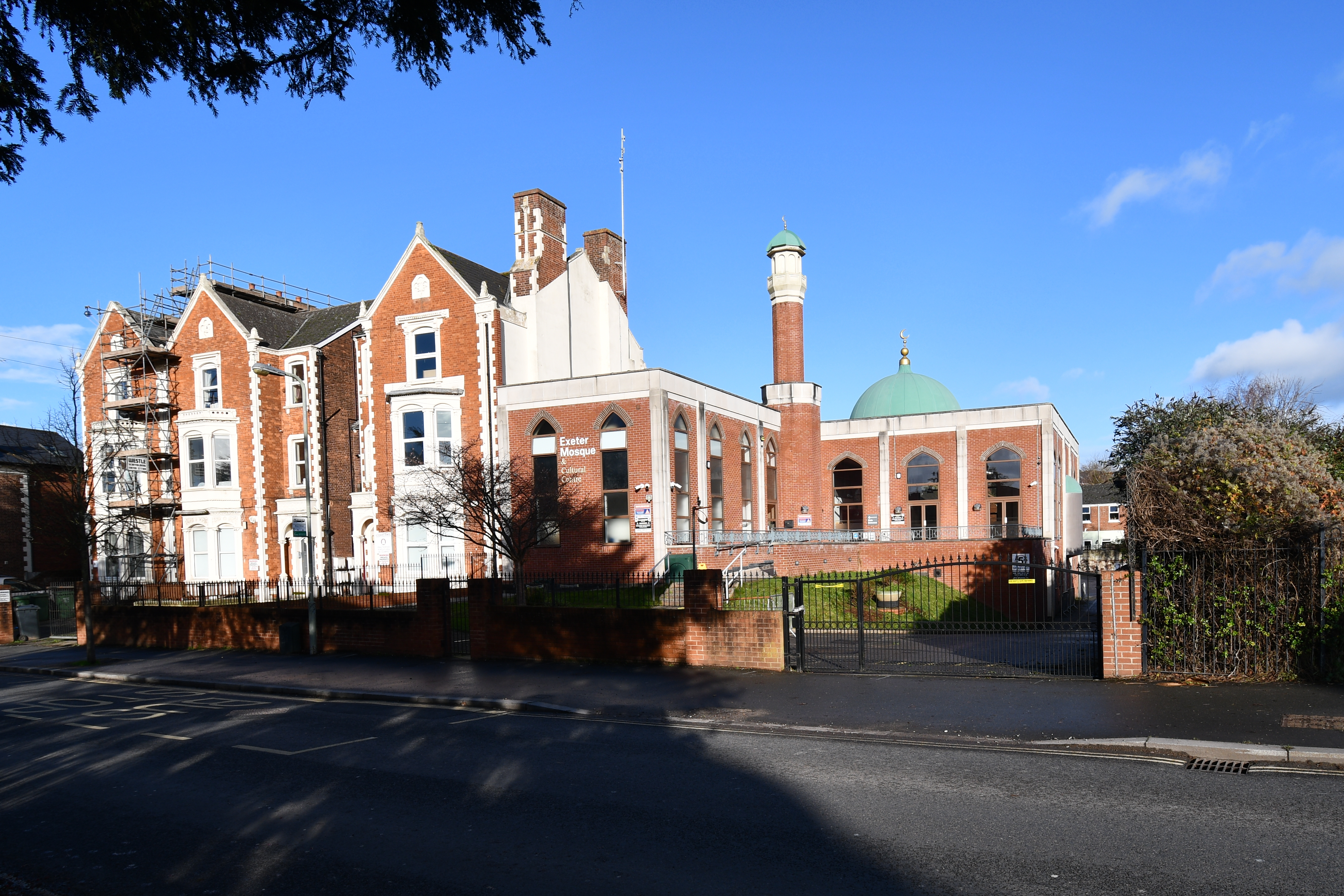

- Location in Devon

Religion
- Affiliation: Islam

Location
- Location: 12-13 York Road, Exeter
- Country: England
- Interactive map of Exeter Mosque & Cultural Centre
- Coordinates: 50.729272°N 3.525023°W

Exeter Mosque & Cultural Centre is a mosque in the City of Exeter, in Devon, England.

== History ==
The mosque's history began in 1976 when 15 York Road was purchased for use as a permanent place for meeting and prayer. Over time, as more space was needed 14 York Road was also purchased. Following a purchase of land from the adjacent school in the late 2020s, work began on a purpose-built mosque for Exeter's Muslim community. The current mosque opened in 2020 following three years of construction work, which cost approximately £1.7 million.

In 2018, the trustees of the mosque faced questions from the media regarding donations received from the cleric Sadiq Al-Ghariani.

Following the 2019 Christchurch mosque shootings, Exeter Mosque was one of the mosques where people stood guard in solidarity with the Muslim community.
