= Giuma Ahmed Atigha =

Libyan politician

- جمعة أحمد عتيقة
- Atigha in 2008

Head of State of Libya
- In office 28 May 2013 – 25 June 2013
- Prime Minister: Ali Zeidan
- Preceded by: Mohammed Magariaf
- Succeeded by: Nouri Abusahmain

President of the General National Congress
- Acting; 28 May 2013 – 25 June 2013
- Deputy: Saleh Essaleh
- Preceded by: Mohammed Magariaf
- Succeeded by: Nouri Abusahmain

Member of the General National Congress
- In office 8 August 2012 – 16 July 2013
- Preceded by: Congress established
- Succeeded by: Congress abolished
- Constituency: Misrata

Personal details
- Born: 1950 (age 75–76) Misrata
- Party: Independent

Giuma Ahmed Atigha (Arabic: جمعة أحمد عتيقة; born 1950) is a Libyan politician who has served as Deputy President of the General National Congress of Libya since 2012, and Acting President of the General National Congress of Libya from the resignation of Mohamed Yousef el-Magariaf on 28 May 2013 to 25 June 2013.

== Political career ==
On 7 July 2012, Giuma Ahmed Atigha was elected as an independent congressman in the 2012 Congressional election. On 10 August, he was elected as deputy president of the General National Congress. Atigha became the acting president of the Congress after the resignation of Mohammed Magariaf. As caretaker head of state, he became the Commander-in-chief of the army.

Political offices
Preceded by Mohammed Magariaf	President of the General National Congress of Libya; Acting; 2013	Succeeded by Nouri Abusahmain
