= Justice and Construction Party =

Political party in Libya

Justice and Construction Party حزب العدالة والبناء Hizb Al-Adala Wal-Bina
- Chairperson: Emad al-Banani
- Spokesperson: Mohamed Gaair
- Founder: Mohamed Sowan
- Founded: 3 March 2012; 14 years ago
- Headquarters: Tripoli, Libya
- Ideology: Islamic democracy; Islamism; Pan-Islamism
- Political position: Right-wing
- Religion: Sunni Islam
- International affiliation: Muslim Brotherhood
- Colours: Azure and gold
- General National Congress: 17 / 200

Website
- www.ab.ly

The Justice and Construction Party (JCP) or Justice and Development Party (Arabic: حزب العدالة والبناء, Hizb Al-Adala Wal-Bina) is a political party in Libya associated with the Muslim Brotherhood. It was officially founded on 3 March 2012 in Tripoli.

Emad al-Banani of Misrata is the head of the party, and Mohamed Gaair is its spokesman. While it finished second in the election of 2014, it is believed to have attracted enough independents to have become the majority, and infighting in the National Forces Alliance has allowed the Brotherhood's political arm to gradually consolidate control over Libya. The party backed the election of Nouri Abusahmain, a Berber and moderate Islamist, over the secular candidates, who were defeated. This gave the Brotherhood a strong position so that once Ali Zeidan was ousted from politics over his mishandling of Morning Glory oil shipments, the Brotherhood had a speaker-president, Abusahmain, with so much authority that they could eventually appoint a moderate Islamist and pro-business politician, Ahmed Maiteeq, as prime minister. The Brotherhood is continuing to consolidate its power; by backing a Berber as president, the JCP has gained stronger support from Libya's ethnic minorities.

== History ==
The Libyan branch of the Muslim Brotherhood was founded in 1949; however, it did not operate openly until after the Libyan Civil War. A public conference was held for the first time in Libya on 17 November 2011 and attended by Libyan Muslim Brotherhood leader Suleiman Abdelkader and Tunisian politician Rashid Ghannouchi. On 24 December 2011, the Libyan Muslim Brotherhood announced its intent to form a political party to contest the Public National Conference election scheduled for June 2012.

The official founding of the party was declared on 3 March 2012 despite the lack of electoral laws governing the foundation of political parties to run in elections. It was launched in Tripoli at a convention attended by 1,400 representatives, many of whom were previously jailed or exiled, from 18 cities. Former political prisoner Mohamed Sowan of Misrata was chosen as the inaugural head of the party. Amongst the party's other original representatives were several more rebel leaders from the civil war and wealthy Libyan expatriates who returned after the war. According to Al Jazeera, the JCP was the country's most organised political force even at the time of its founding, similar to the Egyptian Muslim Brotherhood, which won a plurality in the 2011–12 Egyptian parliamentary elections after its own revolution, which ousted Hosni Mubarak from power.

Justice and Construction competed in the 2012 Libyan General National Congress election, receiving 10% of the vote and winning 17 of the 80 party-list seats. It placed second behind the National Forces Alliance. Furthermore, 17 of the 120 independents in the congress who were associated with the party were elected.

In 2014, the Justice and Construction Party announced that it was withdrawing from government in Libya after failing to secure enough votes to unseat Prime Minister Ali Zeidan. All five of the party's ministers resigned as a result of the futile effort.

== Ideology ==
The Muslim Brotherhood's spokesman Mohamed Gaair stated that the party would seek "to work on security and stability. We are still a new founded party, but we will work on the basis of Islamic principles and that doesn't mean the shallow meaning of religion most people think of like banning women from leaving home." This followed an announcement by the National Transitional Council's interim government, which promoted sharia law as the foundation for new Libyan legislation. The party has also called for a nationally united government to end sectarianism and further conflict through civil dialogue in post-revolutionary Libya.

== Criticism ==
A 2014 article by Foreign Policy described the JCP as a "party bruised" and noted that the Muslim Brotherhood's local Libyan party had not garnered high levels of public support.

In November 2016, former prime minister Khalifa al-Ghawil stated in an interview that the JCP was ruining the country. He had made similar statements before, ultimately claiming that the Muslim Brotherhood had an "agenda that was against the interests of Libyans".

In June 2017, the Libyan House of Representatives (HoR) composed a list of terrorists inside Libya with links to Qatar, a widely purported sponsor of terrorism. The list was signed by Talal Almaihub, chairman of the Defense and National Security Committee of the HoR. Multiple Muslim Brotherhood members were named in the list, including executive member Nizar Kiwan; major donor Abdulrazaq al-Aradi and Ali Salabi, who was called "the man considered to the ideological brains of the Muslim Brotherhood" by the Libya Herald. In response the JCP deemed the list defamation.

=== Protests ===
In July 2013, angry protesters stormed the party's offices in Tripoli following the assassination of prominent Libyan political activist Abdelsalam al-Mismari, who was purportedly killed by the Brotherhood. Mismari was one of the original activists who helped drive a movement to overthrow Gaddafi and had been highly critical of the Muslim Brotherhood's affiliate party in Libya thereafter.

Agence France-Presse interviewed one of the protesters, who proclaimed, "We want all political parties to be dissolved. ... They're the cause of all our problems. First we need a constitution, then laws regulating political life before parties can begin operating [again]."

== See also ==
- List of Islamic political parties
