= LGBTQ rights in Libya =

- Libya
- Legal status: Illegal since 1953
- Penalty: Up to 5 years imprisonment
- Gender identity: No
- Military: No
- Discrimination protections: No

Family rights
- Recognition of relationships: No recognition of same-sex unions
- Adoption: No

Lesbian, gay, bisexual, transgender, and queer (LGBTQ) people in Libya face legal and social challenges not experienced by non-LGBTQ residents. Homosexual activity is criminalised for both men and women within Libya, and homophobic attitudes are prevalent throughout the country. Since the fall of the Gaddafi regime in 2011, the discriminatory laws regarding homosexuality in Libya remain unchanged.

== Legality of same-sex sexual activity ==
The country's criminal code prohibits all sexual activity outside of a lawful marriage. Under Article 407(4) of the Penal Code (1953), private homosexual acts between consenting adults are illegal.

The criminal code is still technically in operation, although much of Libya is run by competing militias who may choose to execute LGBTQ people. ISIS in Libya has publicly executed men for purported homosexuality.

Vigilante executions, in lieu of the penal code, are more commonplace in ISIS-controlled territories.

=== Transitional Government ===
The Transitional post-Gaddafi government continues to oppose LGBTQ rights. In February 2012, a Libyan delegate sparked outrage after telling a United Nations human rights panel that gay people threaten the future of the human race.

==== Interim Constitution ====
The Transitional Constitution stipulates that Islam is the official religion and a source of law. The Transitional Constitution also pledges to respect the people's right to private life.

== Enforcement ==
In 2010, the Gay Middle East blog reported that two adult men had been charged with "indecent acts", which meant cross-dressing and homosexual conduct.

Female homosexuality would also appear to be illegal, as is making any sort of public acknowledgment that a person is gay. In 2010 a French asylum case involved a Libyan girl who sought asylum after being jailed, raped and then returned to her family for a forced marriage after she made a public statement online that she was gay.

There have been reports of armed groups arresting and executing people accused of homosexual activity since 2011. In 2023 Amnesty International reported that the Internal Security Agency in Tripoli and other armed militias arrested tens of individuals based on their sexual orientation. In March 2023 the Office of the Public Prosecutor referred 19 individuals on charges of "homosexuality" and "atheism".

== History ==
In the 1990s, the General People's Congress began to approve "purification" laws designed to enforce a harsh view of Islamic law on the population. Libyan courts were given the power to use amputation, flogging and other punishments against persons found to be violating traditional Islamic morality.

=== Gaddafi government ===
The Gaddafi government did not permit the public advocacy of LGBTQ rights. When discussed, it was always in a negative manner, in keeping with traditional Islamic morality.

In 2003, Gaddafi stated that he believed that it was "impossible" to contract AIDS–HIV through unprotected, heterosexual vaginal sex.

== Organizations ==
As of 2026, Libya is represented by only two LGBTQ+ non-governmental organizations: Kun Libya, and Sawt. These entities operate within a highly challenging environment, as members of Libya's LGBTQ+ community face pervasive security and social pressures to remain closeted. This hostile climate has been substantially exacerbated by the political instability, security vacuum, and broader breakdown of state institutions following the outbreak of conflict and fall of the central state in 2014.

== Summary table ==
| Same-sex sexual activity legal | No (Penalty: Up to 5 years in jail.); In areas under control of militia groups, including Islamic State, LGBTQ people are executed, subject to forced disappearances, torture and other violence. |
| Equal age of consent | No |
| Anti-discrimination laws in employment only | No |
| Anti-discrimination laws in the provision of goods and services | No |
| Anti-discrimination laws in all other areas (incl. indirect discrimination, hate speech) | No |
| Same-sex marriages | No |
| Same-sex civil unions | No |
| Recognition of same-sex couples | No |
| Step-child adoption by same-sex couples | No |
| Joint adoption by same-sex couples | No |
| Gays and lesbians allowed to serve openly in the military | No |
| Right to change legal gender | No |
| Access to IVF for lesbians | No |
| Commercial surrogacy for gay male couples | No |
| MSMs allowed to donate blood | On Libya's blood donation page, it states that donations from men who have sex with men are restricted due to the risk of HIV. However, on the page that lists when blood donation is prohibited, MSM are not listed. |

== See also ==
- Human rights in Libya
- LGBTQ rights in Africa
