= Al-Salhin El-Obeidi =

Libyan civil engineer and politician

- الصالحين العبيدي
- El-Obeidi in 2026

Speaker of the House of Representatives
- Incumbent
- Assumed office 6 October 2026
- Deputy: 1st Deputy Speaker Fawzi Al‑Nuwairi; 2nd Deputy Speaker Mesbah Doma
- Preceded by: Aguila Saleh Issa

Member of the House of Representatives
- Incumbent
- Assumed office 4 August 2014
- Constituency: Tobruk

Personal details
- Born: Al-Salhin Abdelnabi Mohammed Saad El-Obeidi; 2 December 1964 (age 61) Tobruk, Libya
- Party: Independent
- Occupation: Civil Engineer, and Politician

Al-Salhin Abdelnabi Mohammed Saad El-Obeidi (Arabic: الصالحين عبدالنبي محمد سعد العبيدي; born 2 December 1964) is a Libyan civil engineer. He was elected Speaker of the Libyan House of Representatives on October 6, 2026, succeeding Aguila Saleh, who had held the position for over 12 years following amendments to the parliament's internal regulations that limited the speakership to a single one-year term.

Following a vote held by members of the House of Representatives at the assembly's headquarters in Tobruk, Al-Salhin El-Obeidi was selected to lead the parliament during its new phase, amidst efforts to organize legislative work and move past previous disputes regarding the conduct of sessions.

== Biography ==
Al-Salhin El-Obeidi holds a master's degree in Civil Engineering and is a prominent parliamentary and political figure representing the city of Tobruk. He held various roles within the Council prior to his election as its Speaker.

== Speaker of the House of the Representatives ==
In early October 2026, amidst mounting parliamentary discontent and a recognized need to regulate decision-making mechanisms and amend internal bylaws to end long-term monopolies on the position and limit the Speaker’s tenure to one year a pivotal parliamentary election took place, resulting in MP Al-Salhin El-Obeidi winning the presidency of the Libyan House of Representatives, succeeding Aguila Saleh.

Political offices
Preceded by Aguila Saleh Issa	Speaker of the House of Representatives of Libya; 2026–Present	Incumbent
