= Abu Bakr Baira =

Libyan politician (1941–2026)

Abu Bakr Baira أبوبكر بعيرة
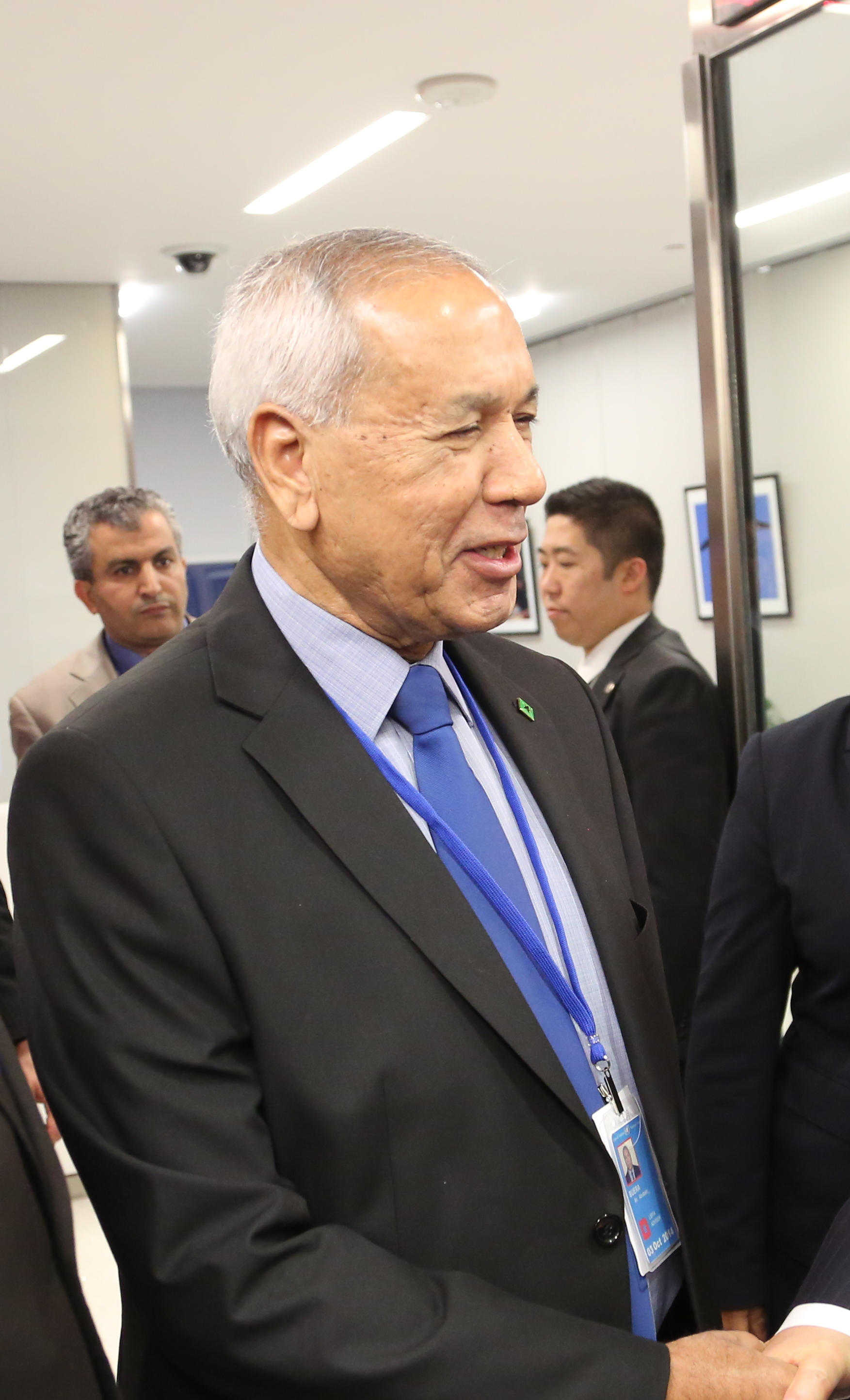
- Baira in 2014

Speaker of the House of Representatives
- Acting; 4 August 2014 – 5 August 2014
- Preceded by: Nouri Abusahmain (as President of the General National Congress)
- Succeeded by: Aguila Saleh Issa

Member of the House of the Representative
- In office 4 August 2014 – 3 November 2026
- Constituency: Benghazi

Head of State of Libya
- In office 4 August 2014 – 5 August 2014*
- Prime Minister: Abdullah al-Theni
- Preceded by: Nouri Abusahmain
- Succeeded by: Aguila Saleh Issa

Personal details
- Born: July 21, 1941
- Died: November 3, 2026 (aged 85)
- Party: Independent
- Education: University of Benghazi; University of California, Los Angeles; University of Missouri, Columbia
- *Baira's position as head of state was disputed by Nouri Abusahmain

Abu Bakr Mustaffa Baira (Arabic: أبوبكر مصطفى بعيرة; 21 July 1941 – 3 November 2026) was a Libyan politician who was the Acting Speaker of the House of Representatives (also known as the Libyan House of Representatives-HoR Arabic: مجلس النواب) of Libya, a role he held as the oldest member of Libya's legislature until Aguila Saleh Issa was appointed permanent chair.

== Biography ==
Baira became a professor of Management and Marketing at the American University of Nigeria (ABTI) as well as a senate member of the same university in Nigeria. He is a former candidate as Prime Minister of Government of National Accord-GNA in Libya (Presidential Council of Libya).

He died on 3 November 2026.

== Work ==
Baira has been Chairman of the Management Department in the Faculty of Economics and Commerce at the University of Benghazi (Garyonis) from 1975 to 1982. From 1982 on, he was the professor of management at this university. He also served in a number of board memberships in different Libyan major organizations.

He was Senior Management Advisor and Head of Research and Studies Dept at the Arab Organization for Administrative Sciences in Amman (Arab League) from 1982 to 1984. From 1984 to 1985, Buera was dean for Academic Affairs, Faculty of Economics and Commerce at the Garyonis University. Later, from 1985 to 1987 he was dean at the Higher Institute for Administrative Sciences in Libya; and again in 1991. He served as training director at the Arab Organization for Administrative Development from 1987 to 1991 and as director general at the Manpower Information Centre in Libya in 1999.

He was elected as a member of the Academic Promotions Committee within the College of Commerce & Economics at Sultan Qaboos University (SQU in Oman) in 2003, as well as a member of the College Board at the same college from 2003 to 2005.

Baira served as MP (elected) in the Libyan House of Representatives-HoR, from August 2014. He was a founding member (elected) of the Libyan political dialogue (Libyan Political Agreement) in Skhirat but he resigned in October 2015 due to breaking the original (fourth) draft of the Libyan Political agreement (agreed at the UN General Assembly September 2015 in New York).

== Publications ==
- Principles of Management, 6th edition, (Banghazi: University of Garyonis, 2011) (in Arabic)
- Principles of Marketing (Banghazi: University of Garyonis, 1991) (in Arabic)
- Multinational Management, 2nd edition, (Tripoli: The Open University, 1999) (in Arabic)
- Modernizing University Administration (Amman: Union of Arab Universities, 1990); a co-authored mimeograph (in Arabic)
- Training Needs Assessment Guide (Benghazi: Higher Institute for Administrative Sciences, 1992) (in Arabic)
- Democratic Management: A Comparative Approach (Tripoli: National Institute of Administration, 1988) (in Arabic)
- Management Encyclopedia (Benghazi: University of Benghazi/Garyounis, 1990) (in Arabic)
- Administrative Control (Amman: Arab Organization for Administrative Sciences, 1993)
- International Business in the Middle East (London: Croom Helms Publishers, 1986); co-author.
- Management Elites: A Comparative Approach (Tripoli: Arab Development Institute, 1982)
- The Administrative Development policy in Libya : A Macro Approach (Chapter in book) in : Public Policy in Libya, Proceedings of the first national conference on public policies in Libya, Center for Research and Consultation, University of Benghazi, Libya, 2009 (in Arabic)

Political offices
Preceded by Nouri Abusahmain as President of the General National Congress of Libya	President of the House of Representatives of Libya; Acting; 2014	Succeeded by Aguila Saleh Issa
