= Aguila Saleh Issa =

Libyan jurist and politician (born 1940)

- عقيلة صالح عيسى
- Saleh in 2024

Speaker of the House of Representatives
- In office 5 August 2014 – 6 October 2026
- Deputy: 1st Deputy Speaker Fawzi Al‑Nuwairi; 2nd Deputy Speaker Mesbah Doma
- Preceded by: Abu Bakr Baira (a.i.)
- Succeeded by: Al-Salhin El-Obeidi

Member of the House of Representatives
- Incumbent
- Assumed office 4 August 2014
- Constituency: Al Qubbah

Head of State of Libya (Note: as Speaker of the House of Representatives)
- In office 5 August 2014 – 15 March 2021*
- Prime Minister: Abdullah al-Theni
- Preceded by: Abu Bakr Baira
- Succeeded by: Fayez al-Sarraj (Note: as Chairman of the Presidential Council under the Government of National Accord, internationally recognized; Mohamed al-Menfi as Chairman of the Presidential Council under the Government of National Unity)

Personal details
- Born: 1 June 1942 (age 84) Al Qubbah, Libya
- Party: Independent
- *Issa's position as head of state was disputed by Nouri Abusahmain from 5 August 2014 to 30 March 2016, then by Fayez al-Sarraj from 30 March 2016 to 15 March 2021.

Aguila Saleh Issa Gueider (Arabic: عقيلة صالح عيسى اقويدر; born 1 June 1942) is a Libyan jurist and politician who served as the Speaker of the Libyan House of Representatives from 2014 to 2026. In that capacity, he also served as the head of state of Libya from 2014 to 2021 under the Tobruk-based second Cabinet of Prime Minister Abdullah al-Theni, which, from its formation in 2014 to the formation of the Tripoli-based Cabinet of Fayez al-Sarraj in 2016, was recognized by the international community as the legitimate government of Libya during the second Libyan civil war. He is also a representative of the town of Al Qubbah, in the east of the country.

== Biography ==
Issa was born on 1 June 1942, in the town of Al Qubbah, Libya.

Following the 2014 Libyan parliamentary election, Issa was elected as Parliament Speaker but was forced to flee to Tobruk along with the rest of the Libyan House of Representatives after Tripoli was seized by militias.

On 20 February 2015, Issa's residence was the target of bombing by ISIL militants in the town of Al Qubbah. In what became known as Al Qubbah bombings, bombs also targeted a petrol station and a police station. It was one of the deadliest attacks in Libya since the end of the 2011 Civil War, resulting in a total of at least 40 people killed, although it was not clear how many died in the attack on his residence. ISIL said that the attacks were carried out in retaliation for the 2015 Egyptian military intervention in Libya.

On 20 September 2021, Issa announced his intention to temporarily withdraw from parliament in order to run as a candidate for president in the 2021 Libyan general election.

On 7 October 2026, the House of Representatives removed Issa as speaker.

== Notes ==
Political offices
Preceded by Abu Bakr Baira; Acting	Speaker of the House of Representatives of Libya; 2014–2026	Succeeded by Al-Salhin El-Obeidi
