= Mohamed Sowan =

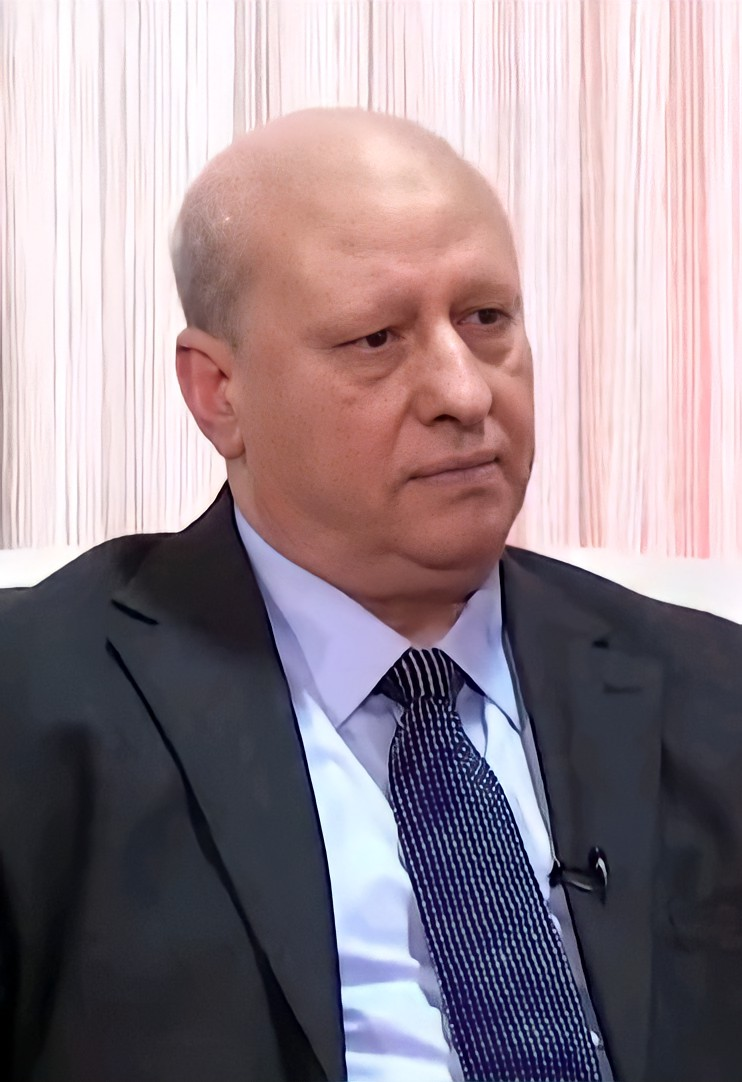

Chairman of Democratic Party
- Incumbent
- Assumed office 1 July 2021
- Preceded by: Ahmed Shebani

Chairman of Justice and Construction Party
- In office 3 March 2012 – 21 June 2021
- Preceded by: Office established
- Succeeded by: Emad al-Banani

Personal details
- Party: Justice and Development Party (2012-2021); Democratic Party (2021-present)
- Profession: Hotel manager

Mohamed Sowan (Arabic: محمد صوان) is a Libyan Islamist activist and politician. He has been the leader of the Justice and Development Party since its foundation in March 2012. The Justice and Development Party is the political wing of the Libyan Muslim Brotherhood. Sowan is from the city of Misrata. He was imprisoned by the deposed Libyan Arab Jamahiriya government, until he was released in 2006 and subsequently worked as a hotel manager.

== Personal life ==
Sowan is of Turkish origin.
