= 2014 Libyan parliamentary election =

Parliamentary election in Libya

- 25 June 2014
- 191 of the 200 seats in the House of Representatives
Party	Vote %	Seats	+/–
Independents	100	191	+71
This lists parties that won seats. See the complete results below.
Prime Minister before	Prime Minister
Abdullah al-Theni; Independent	Abdullah al-Theni; Independent

Parliamentary elections were held in Libya on 25 June 2014 for the House of Representatives. Whilst all candidates ran as independents, the elections saw nationalist and liberal factions win the majority of seats, with orthodox muslim groups being reduced to only around 30 seats. Election turnout was very low at 18%.

After the election was complete, two constitutional claims were brought before the Libyan Supreme Court (LSC). On 7 November 2014 the LSC ruled the amendment to Article 11 of paragraph 30 of the Constitutional Declaration invalid, which set out the road map for Libya's transition and the House elections. This in extension invalidated the entire legislative and elective process leading to the establishment of the House including the election. Therefore, this meant the House was effectively dissolved.

Due to controversy about constitutional amendments the House refused to take office from General National Congress (GNC) in Tripoli, which was controlled by powerful militias from the western coastal city of Misrata. Instead, they established their parliament in Tobruk.

The international community through the United Nations Support Mission in Libya (UNSMIL) announced recognition of the House and thus ignored the Supreme Court ruling. It was seen as unrealistic at the time to dissolve the House.

== Background ==
The General National Congress was elected in July 2012, with the responsibility of forming a constituent assembly to write the constitution. However, the National Transitional Council decided that Libyans would instead directly elect the constituent assembly. The General National Congress came to agreement on 10 April 2013 that constituent assembly members would be elected; the election for most of the constituent assembly took place on 20 February 2014.

On 25 May 2014, the General National Congress set 25 June 2014 as the date for elections to the House of Representatives. Article 16 of the Electoral Law voted by the GNC on 30 March 2014 with 124 votes in favour out of 133, allocated 30 seats for women, and 200 seats overall, with individuals able to run as members of political parties, but without party lists, and declared Libyans with a second nationality to be eligible.

== Electoral system ==
The 200 seats were elected in 13 constituencies divided into 75 sub-constituencies. In an attempt to reduce tensions, all candidates contested the election as individuals, instead of running on party lists.

== Conduct ==
=== Turnout ===
I didn't bother to register this time around, and that should tell you everything. My friends were killed in the revolution, we paid in blood for this democracy, but what was the result of the [previous] election? Candidates make big promises, but when they get the power, nothing.

— Mohammed Abu Baker, 21-year-old student

Turnout was a mere 18%, down from 60% in the first post-Gaddafi election of July 2012, with only 630,000 people voting. Barely a third of Libya's 3.4 million eligible voters had registered for the country's Constitutional Assembly election in February. "Declining enthusiasm reflects growing disgust with the authorities' failure to govern," said The Economist.

No voting took place in Derna, which had been the scene of a campaign of bombings and assassinations from radical Islamist groups based there. Some polling stations were also closed in Kufra and Sabha for security reasons.

=== Violence ===
There were several instances of violence on the day of the election, with at least five people dying in clashes between government forces and militants in Benghazi. According to security officials the deaths happened when insurgents opened fire on a local security headquarters, with the violence resulting in at least another 30 people being wounded.

In a separate incident Human Rights activist Salwa Bughaighis was shot dead at her Benghazi home after having returned home from voting. Her attackers were reportedly hooded and were wearing military uniforms. Bughaighis, a native of Benghazi, was a lawyer by profession and had three children. She had played an active role in the overthrow of Gaddafi and had served as a member of Libya's interim National Transitional Council.

== Results ==
The results were announced on 22 July 2014. All 1,714 candidates stood as independents as party lists were forbidden under the electoral system. Of the 200 seats up for election, 188 were announced on 22 July, with the announcement for the other 12 being delayed due to boycott or insecurity in some electoral districts. Most of the seats were taken by secular factions, with the orthodox muslim faction only winning around 30 seats. Some analysts immediately feared the results could reinvigorate fighting between secular and Islamist forces.

On 12 August 2014, the parliament voted in favor of the Libyan head of state being directly elected, as opposed to being appointed by the House of Representatives. Of the Representatives present 141 voted in favour, with 2 opposing and 1 abstaining.

After the Islamist coup of 23 August 2014, the parliament moved to the Operation Dignity stronghold of Tobruk.

Party	General seats			Women seats			Total seats
Party	Votes	%	Seats	Votes	%	Seats	Total seats
Independents	570,939	100.00	161	346,735	100.00	30	191
Vacant			7			2	9
Total	570,939	100.00	168	346,735	100.00	32	200

=== Votes by constituency ===
District	Constituency	General seats		Women seats	
District	Constituency	Votes	Seats	Votes	Seats
1. Tobruk	Tobruk	24,851	4		
1. Tobruk	Al Quba	7,125	2	6,440	1
1. Tobruk	Derna	(Note: No election was held. Three seats left vacant.)		(Note: No election was held. One seat left vacant.)	
2. Al Bayda	Shahat	5,156	2	24,149	1
2. Al Bayda	Al Bayda	14,800	3	24,149	1
2. Al Bayda	Al Marj	10,551	3	24,149	1
2. Al Bayda	Qasr Libya	7,440	1	6,354	1
3. Benghazi	Benghazi	65,717	16	58,626	4
3. Benghazi	Tokra	3,901	2		
3. Benghazi	Al Abyar	6,472	2		
3. Benghazi	Qaminis	2,926	1		
3. Benghazi	Suluq	3,147	1		
4. Ajdabiya	Ajdabiya	12,800	3	11,716	1
4. Ajdabiya	Brega	1,769	1	11,716	1
4. Ajdabiya	Awjilah	1,381	1	4,050	1
4. Ajdabiya	Jalu + Ajkhra	2,835	1	4,050	1
4. Ajdabiya	Tazirbu	1,269	1		
4. Ajdabiya	Kufra and surrounding towns	3,789	3		
5. Sirte and Jufra	Sidra	3,009	2		
5. Sirte and Jufra	Sirte	5,992	3	7,205	1
5. Sirte and Jufra	Jufra	5,088	2	4,482	1
6. Sabha and Wadi Al Shati	Sabha	15,517	7	12,294	2
6. Sabha and Wadi Al Shati	Wadi Al Shati	16,035	6	13,148	1
7. Ubari	Ubari	11,502	5	8,462	1
7. Ubari	Ghat	2,873	2		
7. Ubari	Wadi Etba	2,656	1		
7. Ubari	Murzuq	6,341	1	6,349	1
7. Ubari	Traghen	964	1		
7. Ubari	Umm Al Aranib	784	1		
7. Ubari	Zawila	1,257	1		
7. Ubari	Qatrun	2,323	1		
8. Gharyan	Gharyan	10,185	3	6,577	1
8. Gharyan	Al Asabaa	2,920	1		
8. Gharyan	Kikla + Al Qalaa	481	1		
8. Gharyan	Yafran	3,847	1		
8. Gharyan	Rayayna	1,271	1		
8. Gharyan	Ruhaybat	1,952	1		
8. Gharyan	Al Rajban	1,341	1		
8. Gharyan	Jadu				
8. Gharyan	Zintan	1,332	2		
8. Gharyan	Mizda	4,590	1		
8. Gharyan	Nalut	951	1		
8. Gharyan	Batn Al Jabal	2,262	1		
8. Gharyan	Kabao	1,419	1		
8. Gharyan	Ghadames	2,189	1		
9. Misrata	Tawergha	1,787	1		
9. Misrata	Misrata	45,492	7	35,596	1
9. Misrata	Bani Walid	3,785	2		
9. Misrata	Zliten	14,428	4	10,948	1
10. Al-Khums	Tarhuna	6,623	3	4,899	1
10. Al-Khums	Msallata	6,551	2		
10. Al-Khums	Al Khums Al Sahel	6,921	2		
10. Al-Khums	Al Khums Al Madina	3,422	2		
10. Al-Khums	Qasr Al Akhyar	3,915	1		
11. Tripoli	Garabulli	3,563	1	2,819	1
11. Tripoli	Tajoura	12,565	3		
11. Tripoli	Souq Al Juma	28,368	4	19,198	1
11. Tripoli	Central Tripoli	23,967	2	19,689	1
11. Tripoli	Hay Al Andalus	17,952	3	14,041	2
11. Tripoli	Janzour	12,811	2	11,483	1
11. Tripoli	Abu Salim	9,329	3	7,968	1
11. Tripoli	Ain Zara	8,471	3	5,938	1
12. Al Aziziyah	Al Maya	5,371	1	21,298	1
12. Al Aziziyah	Al Nasiriyah	3,296	1	21,298	1
12. Al Aziziyah	Al Aziziyah	5,063	2	21,298	1
12. Al Aziziyah	Suwani Bin Adam	4,654	1	21,298	1
12. Al Aziziyah	Qasr Bin Ghashir	7,384	2	21,298	1
12. Al Aziziyah	Mishehel + Al Saieh + Esbea	6,046	1	21,298	1
13. Zawiya	Al Zawiya	29,279	7	23,006	1
13. Zawiya	Sabratha	5,155	2		
13. Zawiya	Al Ajaylat	4,384	2		
13. Zawiya	Surman	5,347	1		
13. Zawiya	Zuwara				
13. Zawiya	Al Jamil				
13. Zawiya	Riqdalin + Zaltan				
Total		570,939	161	285,522	30

Key results include the following.

Constituency (* indicates women's list)		Votes
1. Tobruk	Saleh al-Tayeh	3,008
1. Tobruk	Nureddin Abdulhamid	1,879
1. Tobruk	Salhin Saad	1,611
1. Tobruk	Muftah al-Sharri	1,389
2. al-Qubbah (Guba)	Agila Gwaider (Saleh Issa)	913
2. al-Qubbah	Talal al-Maihub	623
2. *al-Qubbah	Muna al-Ghaithi	2,559
8. Benghazi	Younis Fanoush	4,838
8. Benghazi	Ibrahim Ameish	4,599
8. Benghazi	Ali Abuzakuk	3,932
8. Benghazi	Tariq al-Jarush	2,863
8. Benghazi	Abubakr Bahira	2,853
8. Benghazi	Adel al-Tira	2,080
8. Benghazi	Ziyad Daghim	2,007
8. Benghazi	Muftah Akuidir	1,792
8. Benghazi	Ahmed al-Wahdi	1,512
8. Benghazi	Aisa al-Arabi	1,417
8. Benghazi	Jalal al-Shweidi	1,307
8. Benghazi	Ramadan Shambesh	1,220
8. Benghazi	Essam al-Jihani	1,073
8. Benghazi	Ibrahim al-Dresi	1,072
8. Benghazi	Saad al-Jazwi	1,057
8. Benghazi	Badr Musa	977
8. *Benghazi	Amal Bayou	14,086
8. *Benghazi	Aisha al-Tablaghi	8,003
8. *Benghazi	Seham Sergiwa	5,883
8. *Benghazi	Asmahan Belaoun	5,452
20 Sirte	Zaid Abubakr	1,093
20 Sirte	Hassan Zarga	875
20 Sirte	Abubakr Mohammed	723
20 *Sirte	Azziza Busetta	2,300
22. Sabha	Ibrahim Ali	1,319
22. Sabha	Misbah Awhida	1,189
22. Sabha	Ahmed Arhuma	912
22. Sabha	Mohamed Arifa	898
22. Sabha	Mohamed Ajdeed	782
22. Sabha	Mohamed al-Hadiri	713
22. Sabha	Yousef Saidi	713
22. *Sabha	Fatima Abu Saada	2,642
22. *Sabha	Ahlam Khalifa	2,326
40. Zintan	Abdussalam Nassiyah	486
40. Zintan	Omar Abu Kadr	374
47. Misrata	Suleiman al-Fagieh	11,166
47. Misrata	Fathi Bashagha	6,589
47. Misrata	Mohamed Raied	2,690
47. Misrata	Abdurrahman Sewehli	2,129
47. Misrata	Mohamed Durrat	2,085
47. Misrata	Mohamed Hneish	1,753
47. Misrata	Kamal al-Jamel	1,646
47. *Misrata	Hanan Shalouf	15,882
49. Zliten	Mohamed Ben Khalil	1,277
49. Zliten	Abdulghani Alftaisi	1,160
49. Zliten	Ezzedden Gwereb	1,105
49. Zliten	Aamar al-Ablag	1,047
49. *Zliten	Naima Dalef	4,420
56. Tajura	al-Sadiq al-Kahaili	1,596
56. Tajura	Abulkair Bilkhair	1,351
56. Tajura	Khaled al-Usta	1,172
58. Tripoli Central	Hamuda Siyala	6,023
58. Tripoli Central	Ali al-Tikbali	4,777
58. *Tripoli Central	Fawzia Abu Ghalia	7,330
59. Hay al-Andalus	Fayez al-Sarraj	3,771
59. Hay al-Andalus	Ali Sbai	2,757
59. Hay al-Andalus	Musab Abulgasim	2,566
59. *Hay al-Andalus	Hana Abudeeb	3,503
59. *Hay al-Andalus	Rabia Aburas	2,775
69. Zawiya	Mohamed al-Hanish	2,271
69. Zawiya	Ali Abu Zariba	2,169
69. Zawiya	Amar Shaibaru	1,880
69. Zawiya	Imhemed Shaib	1,350
69. Zawiya	Salim Ganidi	1,286
69. Zawiya	Abdulnabi Abdulmuali	922
69. Zawiya	Abdallah Alafi	893
69. *Zawiya	Aisha Shalabi	6,533

== Aftermath ==
In November, the Supreme Court annulled the election after an appeal by a group of unnamed MPs on unclear grounds. However, the appealing MPs asserted unconstitutionality as the parliament does not sit in Tripoli or Benghazi and that it had overstepped its authority by calling for foreign military assistance against the national infighting with the militias. Though it cannot be appealed, the Tobruk-based parliament rejected the ruling on the claim that it was delivered "under the threat of arms." MP Abu Bakr Baira added that the ruling was "baseless" and "a step towards dividing the country," he further said that the Tobruk-based parliament would not comply with it. It was met with celebratory gunfire in Tripoli, the seat of the rival and competing Islamist-dominated government.

In further developments, former leader Gaddafi's cousin, Ahmed Gaddaf al-Dam, said that once the "government's" forces regain control of major cities many of the exiled supporters of Gaddafi, who were in talks with parliament, would return to get "Libya back from this mess" and support a national reconciliation programme.
