= Libya Revolutionaries Operations Room =

- غرفة عمليات ثوار ليبيا
- Logo of the Libya Revolutionaries Operations Room
- Leaders: General Chief of Staff of the Libyan Armed Forces (Officially); November 2013–present Nouri Abusahmain (as President of the GNC); May–November 2013; Shaaban Hadia (LROR Commander) Adel Gharyani (LROR Commander)
- Dates active: May 2013–present
- Headquarters: Tripoli, Libya
- Active regions: Tripoli; Benghazi
- Ideology: Islamist leaning
- Wars: the Post-civil war violence in Libya

The Libya Revolutionaries Operations Room (abbreviated LROR; Arabic: غرفة عمليات ثوار ليبيا) is an armed group loyal to Nouri Abusahmain. It has been declared a terrorist organization by the Libyan parliament. It was heavily involved in the Second Libyan Civil War.

The LROR was established in 2013 by Nouri Abusahmain, who had recently been elected GNC President. He formed the LROR by uniting existing militias under his command. Its official task was to keep order in Tripoli. He allegedly misappropriated 900 million Libyan Dinars (US $720 million) to the benefit of the LROR, but this was not investigated as Abusahmain himself suppressed the inquiry. Soon after being formed, the LROR attempted an Islamist coup when the group kidnapped Prime Minister Ali Zeidan in October 2013. The LROR later set up a branch in Benghazi, purportedly to deal with the deteriorating security situation.

== History ==
=== Formation and kidnapping of Prime Minister Ali Zeidan ===
The LROR was created in the fall of 2013 by GNC President Nouri Abusahmain, who tasked it with providing security to Tripoli. The LROR was later involved in the 10 October kidnapping of Prime Minister Ali Zeidan, who it charged with corruption. Zeidan was later rescued the same day after the building where LROR was keeping him was surrounded by a mixture of local protesters and pro-Zeidan militias.

=== Attempts to disestablish ===
On 27 October 2013, Zeidan supporters walked out of a GNC session in protest to last minute changes to the agenda made by Abusahmain. In the changes Abusahmain cancelled a request by GNC members to disestablish the LROR, and also cancelled a request to establish a committee to investigate the allocation by Abusahmain of 900 million Libyan Dinars ($720 million) to the LROR and various other militias. The GNC members had claimed that the allocations made by Abusahmain had been against GNC rules.

On 3 November 2013, the GNC voted to withdraw the LROR's mandate to provide security for Tripoli. In response to the vote LROR forces surrounded the building where the GNC was meeting in an attempt to intimidate members of the GNC. In a compromise vote the GNC agreed to maintain the LROR's mandate for Tripoli, on the terms that the LROR was brought under the control of the General Chief of Staff of the Armed Forces.

== See also ==
- 2013 Libyan coup d'état attempt
- Libyan Civil War (2014–present)
