= Sadiq al-Gharyani =

Grand Mufti of Libya (born 1942)

- الصادق الغرياني
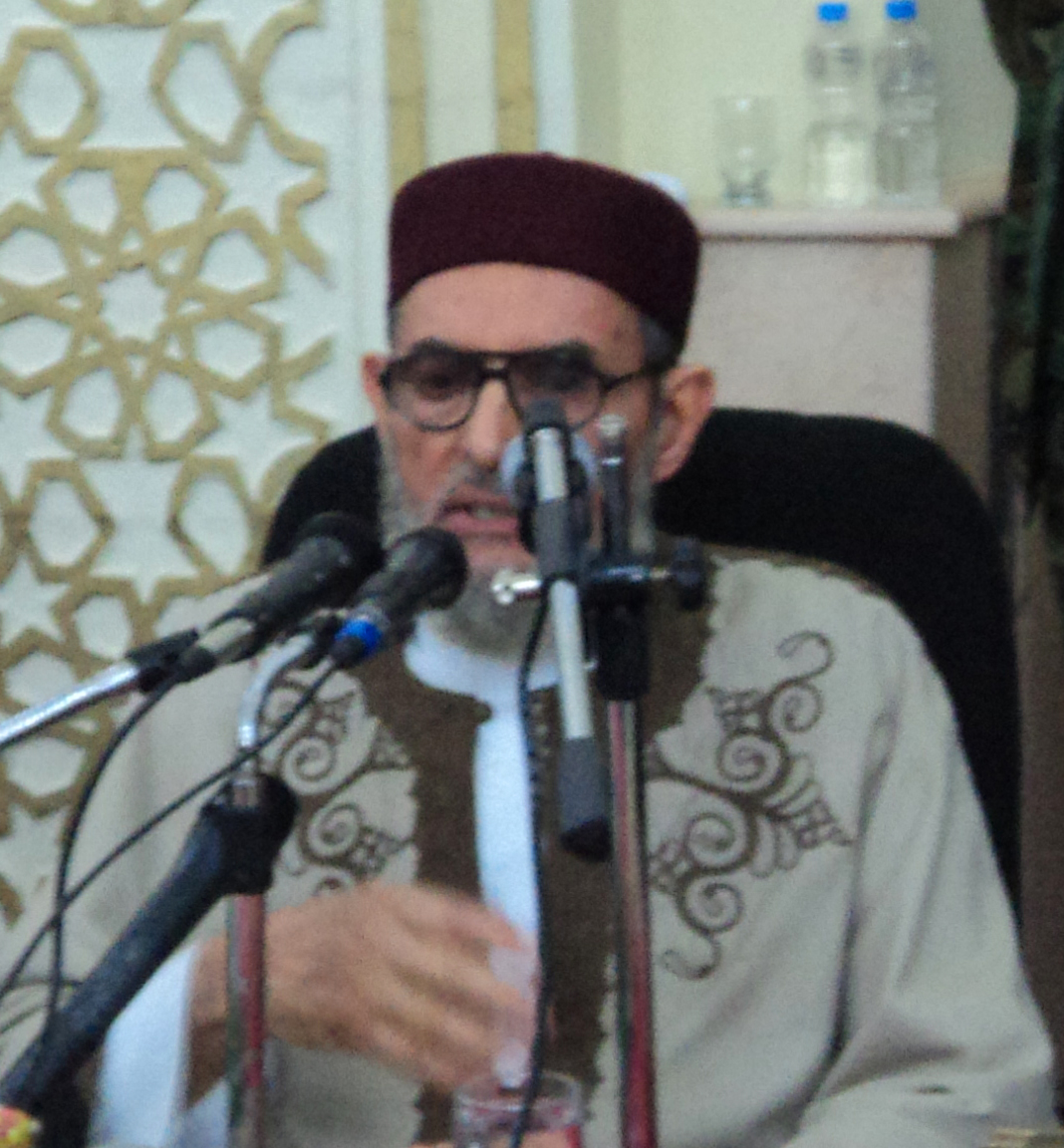

Grand Mufti of Libya
- Incumbent
- Assumed office February 2012
- Preceded by: Muhammad al-Madni al-Shwayrif
- In office 1995–2009
- Succeeded by: Muhammad al-Madni al-Shwayrif

Personal details
- Born: 8 December 1942 (age 83) Tripoli, Italian Libya
- Education: University of Mohammed bin Ali al-Sanusi (BA) al-Azhar University (Msc & PhD); University of Exeter (PhD)
- Profession: Grand Mufti of Libya
- Website: sadiqalghiryani.ly

Religious life
- Religion: Islam
- Denomination: Sunni
- Jurisprudence: Maliki
- Creed: Ash’arism

Sadiq ibn Abd al-Rahman ibn Ali al-Gharyani (Note: Arabic: صادق بن عبد الرحمن بن علي الغرياني, romanized: Ṣādiq ibn ʻAbd al-Raḥmān ibn ʻAlī al-Gharyānī) (born 1942) is a Libyan Islamic cleric and politician who has served as the Grand Mufti of Libya since 2012. A follower of the Maliki school of Sunni Islam, he is a seated professor in the College of Sharia in the University of Tripoli since 1969 and distinguished contributor the Maliki school of thought with his numerous publications. His family originates from the village of Intataat near the city of Gharyan, hence the surname al-Gharyani.

Ideologically an Islamist, Al-Gharyani became more prominent after the 2011 Libyan Revolution and subsequent civil war due to his widely supported fatwas against Muammar Gaddafi and public opposition to Gaddafi's rule on Al Jazeera. Al-Gharyani supported Islamist militias in Libya and has been a fierce critic of Khalifa Haftar. Al-Gharyani has often opposed efforts by Salafi militants to eliminate their opposition and force the creation of a extremist Islamic state. As Grand Mufti and head of the Dar al-Ifta, the office in Libya responsible for religious rulings, his fatwas are not law, but they nevertheless exert an important moral force in government policy and decision-making.

In June 2017, Al-Gharyani was placed on a terrorism watchlist, following accusations of links to terrorism, including allegedly supporting Qatari backing of international terrorism during the 2017 Qatar diplomatic crisis. A number of nations including Saudi Arabia, Bahrain, the UAE, and Egypt, named Al-Gharyani on their joint anti-terror list.

== Background ==
Al-Gharyani was born in 1942. He studied Sharia law at an educational institution in Bayda which is currently known as Omar Al-Mukhtar University. He graduated in 1969 and started teaching there in 1970.

In 1972, he obtained a master's degree with distinction in 'Comparative Jurisprudence' from the Faculty of Sharia and Law, Al-Azhar University in Cairo, Egypt.

In 1979, he obtained his doctorate degree in 'Comparative Jurisprudence' from the Faculty of Sharia and Law at the University of Al-Azhar, under the title (Alhukm Alsharie byna Alnaql wa Alaql) (Islamic Sharia ruling between Text and Mind).

In 1984, he received a doctorate in Arabic and Islamic Studies at the University of Exeter in the United Kingdom.

== Publications ==
Al-Gharyani has released several academic books that are well received by contemporaries in the academic community even by those that oppose him. Especially his most notable publication مدونة الفقه المالكي وأدلته which is praised for bringing complex concepts and making them more available to the less adept reader as well as including views of other schools of thought and talks over many topics including sources from hadeeth and evaluating their authenticity.

=== Aqidah ===
- في العقيدة والمنهج(In Doctrine and Methodology)
- العقيدة الإسلامية(The Aqidah of Islam)

=== Fiqh ===
- مدونة الفقه المالكي وأدلته (Maliki Jurisprudence Code and its Proofs)
- أحكام الميت وعادات المآتم(Rulings and Funeral Customs Concerning the Deceased )
- أحكام المعاملات المالية في الفقه الإسلامي(Rules of Financial Transactions in Islamic Jurisprudence)
- مناسك الحج والعمرة(Rituals of Hajj and Umrah)
- فتاوى وتحقيقات في مسائل فقهية تكثر الحاجة إليها(Fatwas and Investigations into Frequently Needed Jurisprudential Issues)
- فتاوى المعاملات الشائعة (Fatwas on Common Transactions)
- فتاوى المرأة المسلمة(Fatwas for Muslim Women)

=== Academia ===
- الحكم الشرعي بين النقل والعقل. _{(أطروحة دكتوراه الشيخ الأولى في جامعة الأزهر)}
- إيضاح المسالك إلي قواعد الإمام مالك للونشريسي، تحقيق. _{(أطروحة دكتوراه الشيخ الثانية في جامعة إكستر في جنوب غرب بريطانيا)}
- أساسيات الثقافة الإسلامية. _{(مقرر جامعي}

=== Others ===
- الأسرة أحكام وأدلة.
- قمع الحرص بالزهد والقناعة ورد ذل السؤال بالكَتْب والشفاعة، للقرطبي، تحقيق.
- تطبيقات قواعد الفقه عند المالكية من خلال إيضاح المسالك للونشريسي و شرح المنهج المنتخب للمنجور.
- عدة المريد الصادق للشيخ زروق، تحقيق.
- الصلاة بين السواري والقيام مع الإمام حتى ينصرف.
- تصحيحات في تطبيق بعض السنن.
- الزفاف وحقوق الزوجين.
- الأدعية والأذكار.
- الغلو في الدين -غلو التطرف وغلو التصوف.
- نصوص التراث في القديم والحديث.

== Libyan civil war (2011) ==
During the Libyan civil war of 2011, he declared a fatwa calling for jihad against Muammar Gadhaffi during a televised address. Al-Gharyani was later appointed as the Grand Mufti of Libya in February 2012 by the then Islamist dominated National Transitional Council.

Following the fall of Tripoli Airport in August 2014, he stood against the attempted Coup d'état he congratulated the Libya Dawn coalition, saying "I congratulate the revolutionaries in their victory, I give blessing to the martyrs" and keeping his support with the democratic elected government. In 2016, following the crackdown on the Islamist Shura Council of Benghazi Revolutionaries, he continued his full support for the fight against the rebels that attempted a military take over of the sitting democratic government.

== Political career 2011–2014 ==
As is natural in Muslim countries Sheikh Al-Gharyani has been advising the Libyan public over the years since after the February 17th revolution calling for peace and unity in the country and warning the public about issues that affect their religious rights and freedoms including answering questions as a Mufti to give Iftas on complex religious questions, all of these responses are meticulously documented the website Tanasuh. Al-Gharyani was observed to have supported the constitutional governments in Libya and apposing several attempts of democracy in Libya attempted by revolotionist Khalifa Haftar; and consistently calls for the unity of Libyans in the face of threats from ISIS/Daesh in Sirte, Benghazi, and Derna

He is also a notable supporter of hardline Islamist militia Libya Dawn. British media reported that he "faces possible war crimes charges for urging followers to overthrow Libyan government" and that he is currently residing in the United Kingdom, where he gained his doctorate in 1984. However, this report was found to be incorrect and The Guardian later apologized and admitted that the source of the information was dubious.

The Tanasuh TV channel was attacked on numerous occasions, with one incident involving armed men barging in and looting the recording equipment and sacking the broadcasting office in Libya. Reported by Libya Herald and a number of Libyan news outlets.

Al-Gharyani has also been observed to have contacted numerous political parties such as the Tripoli-based GNC requesting to hand over power to "the other body it chooses", implying that Al-Gharyani has the status and power to declare the political future of Tripoli. - Lana News agency '22-07-2016'

On 31 March 2016, Al-Gharyani warned the Presidential Council (Libya) that the doors of jihad will open for at least 10 years if the presidency council under Seraj were to stay in Tripoli, and concluded by advising the Presidency Council to not arrive; and leave Tripoli.

On 22 July 2016, Cleric Sadek Al-Gharyani along with Misrata militia leader Salah Badi and former Islamist-GNC-regime prime minister Omar al-Hassi were found to have facilitated the orchestration of a pro-Islamic based protest against the Presidential Council (Libya) in Tripoli over the presence of French special forces that were recently killed in the downing of their chopper over Benghazi. The protest was initially planned to be symbolic as protesters along western coast cities from Zuwara to Tripoli have set fire to French flags. However the protest turned political as the protesters demanded the UN agreed upon Presidential Council (Libya) (PC) headed by Fayez al-Sarraj to be dismantled or sacked and replaced by the more Islamic supreme revolutionaries’ council.

On 4 August 2016, Clerik Sadek Al-Gharyani stated that the US airstrike in Sirte was illegal in a press conference even though it was requested by the UN agreed upon Presidency Council (led by Chairman Faiez Seraj based in Tripoli as the sole legitimate government of Libya). Al-Gharyani has dismissed the anti-Daesh air strike as a political stunt for US electoral purposes in helping the democratic candidate Hillary Clinton. He has likewise dismissed the presidency council as "illegitimate", coming very close to endorsing the Islamic State in Libya. He has also evidently attacked the RADA special forces in Tripoli (responsible for dealing with rampant crime and Kidnappings ) for "Carrying out crimes of arrest and seizure against Islamist Benghazi Revolutionaries" Al-Gharyani claimed, who have been evidently linked to the Islamic State and terrorist practices via video prisoner confessions that the RADA special forces released.

== Controversial declarations ==
Al-Gharyani's conservative teachings have long been a subject of controversy, and he was criticized in late August 2014 by then Prime Minister Abdullah al-Thani with Quote "Ageing grey Mufti: has no shame in issuing political edicts" on 20 Oct, 2014, for issuing false fatwas and called on Libya's House of Representatives to remove him from his post.

- In March 2013, Cleric Al-Gharyani has issued a fatwa prohibiting Libyan women from marrying foreign men. He has also displayed strong opposition to the "UN Report on Violence Against Women and Girls" and has organised a protest with a number of Libyan women at the UN Headquarters that demanded Sharia Law, and has simultaneously issued a "fatwa against a UN Commission on the Status of Women's report because it urged governments to protect women and girls against violence". Meanwhile, there were also women who have protested in support of the UN commissioned document on Violence against women.

- In February 2014 Al-Gharyani forbade opposition to the General National Congress which was refusing to stand down and hold elections. He called for its enemies to be "eliminated".

- In April 2019 he called for a Hajj and Umrah boycott as a form of protest against Saudi government policies of “killings of Muslim brothers and sisters”.

- In April 2020 Al-Gharyani declared on Libyan Al-Tanasuh TV that suicide bombings are permitted by sharia law.

== Opposition ==
Due to Al-Gharyani's recent political endeavors in Libyan politics in such a crucial time of "the moulding" of the state of Libya, multiple reports emerged that he awaits arrest by Tripoli Militia leader Haithem Tajouri.

Militia leader Haithem Tajouri ordered the "seizure of predominantly Islamic - Muslim brotherhood supporting - Misuratan Intelligence personnel" with support of Intelligence officers Opposing the "Islamic Domination of Intelligence apparatus" News agencies have thus reported on August 14, 2016.

Leaflets have appeared in the streets of Tripoli reportedly showing "NO to the Muslim Brotherhood" with Al-Gharyani's photograph marked with a red Denial symbol.

== Tanasoh TV channel ==
The TV channel Tanasoh is believed to be owned and supported by Sadiq Al-Gharyani and his supporters, and has been branded a radical Islamist propaganda outlet on numerous occasions. Political subjects are usually discussed and often express inflammatory rhetoric. It is believed that the Tanasuh / Tanasoh TV channel was attacked in the past. The British government investigated Sadiq Al-Gharyani for 'inciting Islamic insurgency' in Libya, which eventually led to his ban from the country. The Tanasoh TV channel, leniency towards ISIS and Ansar-Al-Sharia; Sadiq Al-Gharyani and the sudden radical-Islamist surge in Tripoli and its domestic politics can be attributed to the very potential presence of the Muslim Brotherhood and the broad presence of a growing radical Islamist threat in Libya.

== Designation of links to terrorism ==
In June 2017, following the 2017 Qatar diplomatic crisis, a number of nations including Egypt, Bahrain, Saudi Arabia, United Arab Emirates, Yemen, Maldives, Mauritania, Senegal, Comoros, Chad, Somaliland, and Libya's Tobruk government, agreed to designate Sadiq Al-Gharyani as having Links to Qatari-backed terrorism sponsorship and terrorism-related activities following Al-Gharyani's claimed spreading of radical propaganda in Libya, in addition to fatwas inciting violence.

The list has recently been expanded with more radical individuals from Libya such as Ali Muhammad al-Sallabi who is considered to be the leading member of the Muslim Brotherhood in Libya. The Libya Herald stated that "Sadiq al Ghariani has Qatari residence permit and is said to be involved in numerous Qatari organizations, although based in Misrata".

== Notes ==
Religious titles
Preceded by	Grand Mufti of Libya; 2012-Present	Succeeded by
