= Libya Herald =

English-language newspaper in Tripoli

- Type: Online newspaper
- Founder(s): Michel Cousins and Sami Zaptia
- Editor-in-chief: Michel Cousins
- Managing editor: Sami Zaptia
- Founded: February 17, 2012
- Language: English
- Headquarters: Tripoli, Libya
- Website: libyaherald.com

The Libya Herald (Arabic: ليبيا هيرلد) is an English-language newspaper based in Tripoli, Libya, launched on 17 February 2012.

== Creation ==
The Libya Herald was launched on 17 February 2012, the first anniversary of the outbreak of the Libyan Civil War, and currently publishes news through its website, though plans are in place to launch a print edition in the near future. The Libya Herald was the initiative of Michel Cousins, a British journalist raised in Libya who has worked in the Arab world for much of his career. Cousins co-founded the paper together with Sami Zaptia, a Libyan journalist who worked for the state-owned Tripoli Post for ten years but resigned upon the outbreak of the Libyan Civil War, frustrated at the Gaddafi regime's strict censorship.

== Editors ==
Until January 2013, the paper's deputy editor was George Grant, a British journalist who also worked as Libya correspondent for The Times newspaper. Grant was subsequently forced to leave Libya following an abduction threat from suspected Islamists in Benghazi following an investigation he was conducting into a death list in the city.
