= General National Congress =

Legislative authority of Libya (2012–2016)

General National Congress المؤتمر الوطني العام

Type
- Type: Unicameral

History
- Founded: 8 August 2012; 25 August 2014
- Disbanded: 4 August 2014; 5 April 2016
- Preceded by: National Transitional Council
- Succeeded by: House of Representatives; High Council of State

Leadership
- President: Mohammed Magariaf (2012–13); Nouri Abusahmain (2013–16)
- Deputy presidents: First Deputy: Giuma Ahmed Atigha (2012–13); Ezzidine Mohammed Al-Awami (2013–2014); Saleh Makhzoum (2014–16); Second Deputy: Saleh Essaleh

Structure
- Seats: 200
- Political groups: National Forces Alliance (39) Justice and Construction (17); National Front (3); Union for the Homeland (2); National Centrist (2); Wadi Al-Hayah (2); Other parties/blocs (15) Independents (120)

Elections
- Voting system: Parallel voting: 80 seats through party-list proportional representation and 120 seats through multiple-member districts
- Last election: 7 July 2012

Meeting place
- Al Nasr Convention Centre; Tripoli, Libya

The General National Congress or General National Council (GNC; Arabic: المؤتمر الوطني العام) was the legislative authority of Libya for two years following the end of the First Libyan Civil War. It was elected by popular vote on 7 July 2012, and took power from the National Transitional Council on 8 August.

Tasked primarily with transitioning Libya to a permanent democratic constitution, it was given an 18-month deadline to fulfill this goal. When the deadline passed with work on the new constitution only just having gotten underway, Congress was forced to organise elections to a new House of Representatives, which took power and replaced it on 4 August 2014.

A non-reelected minority of former GNC members, supported by the LROR and Central Shield armed groups, met on 25 August 2014 and declared a National Salvation Government. They elected Omar al-Hasi as prime minister. From August 2014, GNC is no longer internationally recognized as the legitimate parliament of Libya.

On 5 April 2016, the GNC announced its own dissolution and has been replaced by the High Council of State.

== History ==
=== Inauguration ===
In a ceremony on 8 August 2012, the National Transitional Council formally transferred power to the General National Congress. Mustafa Abdul Jalil stepped down as head of state, passing the position to the GNC's oldest member, Mohammed Ali Salim. The NTC was then dissolved, while the GNC members took their oaths of office, led by Salim.

Hundreds of people gathered in Tripoli's Martyrs' Square with candles symbolizing reconciliation. The date of the transfer – 20 Ramadan on the Islamic calendar – had also been selected for symbolic reasons; as 20 Ramadan the previous year had fallen on 20 August, the date that the National Liberation Army attacked Tripoli, leading to Gaddafi's flight. As Jalil addressed the crowd, attendees periodically chanted "Allāhu Akbar" or "The blood of the martyrs will not be wasted!"

According to BBC News, the transfer was "the first peaceful transition of power in Libya's modern history".

=== Post-2014 elections ===
In 2014, elections to a new House of Representatives were held. However, politicians from the blocs that lost the elections continued to convene as the General National Congress, claiming that the GNC was the legitimate parliament of Libya. However, its members did not represent a majority of the membership of the body, as the majority of the GNC members belonged to groups now participating in the internationally recognized (until the establishment of an internationally-backed Government of National Accord in 2016) Libyan parliament, the House of Representatives. The GNC is dominated by the Muslim Brotherhood's Libyan party, the Justice and Construction Party.

Re-elected members from the Islamist bloc had chosen to continue to sit in the GNC, instead of the House of Representatives where they would be in a reduced minority.

After their landslide defeat in the 2014 elections, Islamist parties acting under the leadership of Nouri Abusahmain used two armed groups, the LROR and Central Shield, to take control of the capital Tripoli. In late August, Islamist militias abducted rivals (whose whereabouts are unknown) and attacked 280 homes. Having suppressed dissent, the Islamist groups declared that they were the General National Congress and that it was once again the national parliament.

The GNC continued to be led by Nouri Abusahmain and appointed Omar al-Hasi then Khalifa al-Ghawi as prime ministers of the National Salvation Government.

=== Dissolution ===
Members of the House of Representatives and the General National Congress signed a United Nations supported political agreement on 17 December 2015. Under the terms of the agreement, a nine-member Presidency Council and a seventeen-member interim Government of National Accord would be formed, with a view to holding new elections within two years. The House of Representatives would continue to exist as a legislature and an advisory body, to be known as the State Council, will be formed with members nominated by the New General National Congress.

The Prime Minister of the Government of National Accord (GNA), Fayez al-Sarraj, arrived in Tripoli on 30 March 2016. The following day, it was reported that the GNA has taken control of the prime ministerial offices and that the GNC appointed Prime Minister Khalifa al-Ghawi had fled to Misrata. On 1 April 2016, the head of the media bureau of the National Salvation Government announced that the NSG has resigned and handed its authority back to the General National Congress. Media reports have also claimed that the General National Congress had "virtually disintegrated".

On April 5, the National Salvation Government of the General National Congress announced that it was resigning, "ceasing operations" and ceding power to the Presidential Council. Following the dissolution of the GNC, former members of that body declared the establishment of the State Council, as envisaged by the LPA.

== Composition ==
The General National Congress was composed of 200 members of which 80 were elected through a party list system of proportional representation in 20 districts, ranging from 11 seats to 3 seats in each, and 120 were elected as independents in 69 multiple-member districts, ranging in size from nine seats to 1 seat in each, elected through Single non-transferable voting or First-past-the-post voting. The election was complicated by voters in 53 of the constituencies being able to cast one vote for local member and also to cast a party vote for the proportional representation portion, and by the use of quota to ensure seats for women candidates in the proportional representation portion.

It is estimated that 25 independents were associated with the NFA, 17 with Justice and Construction, and 23 were Salafis.

Following the 2012 elections, an Integrity Commission was set up to exclude and remove Gaddafi-era officials from politics. The commission removed 15 members of the GNC. Independent members from Bayda, Baten al-Jabal, Abu Salim, Hay al-Andalus, Sabha, Tarhuna and Ubari were expelled, along with all the independents from Ghat and Bani Walid, two representatives of local lists from Ubari and Wadi al-Shate’, and two NFA deputies from Zliten and Abu Salim. By March 2013 one expelled member from Bayda had been replaced; all other seats remained vacant.

The Congress was tasked with electing a new Prime Minister and governing cabinet. Among the rules approved by the GNC on the election of the Prime Minister was a prohibition on Prime Ministers and cabinet ministers being GNC members simultaneously.

The Congress selected Mustafa Abushagur as Prime Minister on 12 September 2012, he subsequently resigned after failing to get a cabinet approved. On 14 October 2012, the General National Congress elected former GNC member and human rights lawyer Ali Zeidan as prime minister-designate. Zeidan was sworn in after his cabinet was approved by the GNC.

=== Seats by party ===
Party	Votes	%	Seats
National Forces Alliance	714,769	48.14	39
Justice and Construction Party	152,441	10.27	17
Union for Homeland	66,772	4.50	2
National Front Party	60,592	4.08	3
National Centrist Party	59,417	4.00	2
Homeland Party	51,292	3.45	0
Moderate Ummah Assembly	21,825	1.47	1
Authenticity and Renewal	18,745	1.26	1
National Party For Development and Welfare	17,158	1.16	1
Al-Hekma (Wisdom) Party	17,129	1.15	1
Authenticity and Progress	13,679	0.92	1
Libyan National Democratic Party	13,092	0.88	1
National Parties Alliance	12,735	0.86	1
Ar-Resalah (The Message)	7,860	0.53	1
Centrist Youth Party	7,319	0.49	1
Wadi Al-Hayah Party	6,947	0.47	2
Libya – The Hope	6,093	0.41	1
Labaika National Party	3,472	0.23	1
Libyan Party for Liberty and Development	2,691	0.18	1
Arrakeeza (The Foundation)	1,525	0.10	1
Nation and Prosperity	1,400	0.09	1
National Party of Wadi ash-Shati'	1,355	0.09	1
Other parties	226,415	15.25	0
Independents			120
Total	1,484,723	100.00	200
Valid votes	1,484,723	84.13	
Invalid/blank votes	280,117	15.87	
Total votes	1,764,840	100.00	
Registered voters/turnout	2,865,937	61.58	
Source: Gender Concerns International

== Leadership ==
On 9 August 2012, Congress members voted in a televised meeting for a president for the GNC. Mohamed Yousef el-Magariaf, leader of the National Front Party, won with 113 votes versus independent Ali Zeidan who secured 85 votes. From 1981 until 2011, el-Magariaf was exiled from Libya, and led the NFP's predecessor organisation—called the National Front for the Salvation of Libya—for almost 20 years.

== Location ==
The permanent location of Libya's legislature has not yet been decided, but it has been proposed that a new parliament building could be built within the former Bab al-Azizia compound. As an interim measure, the General National Congress convened in the Al Nasr Convention Centre close to the Rixos Al Nasr hotel in Tripoli. Libya's former legislature, the General People's Congress, met at the People's Hall which had been destroyed by fire during the Libyan Civil War.
