= Nouri Abusahmain =

Libyan politician

- نوري أبو سهمين
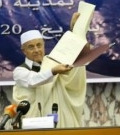
- Nouri Abusahmain signed the law of the constituent body, 2013

Head of State of Libya
- In office 25 June 2013 – 5 April 2016*
- Prime Minister: Ali Zeidan; Abdullah al-Theni; Ahmed Maiteeq (Note: Disputed); Omar al-Hassi; Khalifa al-Ghawil
- Preceded by: Giuma Ahmed Atigha
- Succeeded by: Abu Bakr Baira (Note: 2014; as Acting Speaker of the House of Representatives, internationally recognized); Fayez al-Sarraj (Note: 2016; as Chairman of the Presidential Council under the Government of National Accord)

President of the General National Congress
- In office 25 June 2013 – 5 April 2016*
- Preceded by: Giuma Ahmed Atigha (a.i.)
- Succeeded by: Abu Bakr Baira (2014; as Acting Speaker of the House of Representatives); Aguila Saleh Issa (2016)

Member of the General National Congress
- In office 8 August 2012 – 5 April 2016*
- Preceded by: Congress established
- Succeeded by: Congress abolished
- Constituency: Zuwarah

Personal details
- Born: October 25, 1956 (age 69) Zuwarah, Kingdom of Libya
- Party: Al-Wafaa
- *Abusahmain's position as head of state was disputed by Abu Bakr Baira from 4 August 2014 to 5 August 2014, then by Aguila Saleh Issa from 5 August 2014 to 5 April 2016.

Nouri Abusahmain (Arabic: نوري أبو سهمين; born October 25, 1956) is a Libyan politician who served as the President of the General National Congress (GNC) of Libya from 2013 to 2016, when the GNC dissolved itself and was succeeded by the Government of National Accord under the terms of the Libyan Political Agreement. He was a major figure on the Islamist side of the second Libyan civil war and is the founder of the Libya Revolutionaries Operations Room (LROR), which is recognized as a terrorist organization by the Libyan House of Representatives. He is reported to have rigged proceedings of the GNC while serving as its president.

== Biography ==
He was originally elected to the GNC as member for Zuwarah. He had some support from the Muslim Brotherhood, but stood as an independent candidate. He has denied strong links with the Muslim Brotherhood.

In 2013, he was the Islamist candidate for president of the Libyan General National Congress, but was considered a compromise candidate acceptable to more liberal members of the congress. As a result, he became GNC president on 25 June 2013. He had the support of the Muslim Brotherhood's party, the Justice and Construction Party, in his election. On becoming GNC president, Abusahmain was the first Libyan Berber to attain a national leadership role since the Tripolitanian Republic of 1918–22. Abusahmain immediately set up an Islamist armed group, the LROR, which attempted an Islamist coup in October 2013. He suppressed debates and inquiries which the Islamist part of the GNC did not want, including a debate over his alleged illegal diversion of money towards the LROR.

During Abusahmain's presidency of the GNC and subsequent to GNC's decision to enforce sharia law in December 2013, gender segregation and compulsory hijab were being imposed in Libyan universities from early 2014, provoking strong criticism from Women's Rights groups.

He played a part in the constitutional crisis which emerged when Islamist Ahmed Maiteeq was supposedly elected prime minister in a GNC session in April 2014 which was intimidated by armed Islamist militants bursting into parliament. Although the Deputy Speaker, Justice Ministry, Supreme Court and opposition parties rejected the proceedings as illegal, Abusahmain signed a decree confirming Maiteeq.

According to supporters of the eastern government, his term ended when the new House of Representatives was established on 4 August 2014. He was succeeded by Abu Bakr Baira, the interim head of new parliament. He was also GNC representative for his Berber hometown of Zuwarah, in the west of the country.

== Notes ==
Political offices
Preceded by Giuma Ahmed Atigha; Acting	President of the General National Congress of Libya; 2013–2014	Succeeded by Abu Bakr Baira as Acting President of the House of Representatives of Libya
Preceded by Abu Bakr Baira as Acting President of the House of Representatives of Libya	President of the General National Congress of Libya; 2014–2016	Succeeded by Fayez al-Sarraj as Chairman of the Presidential Council of Libya
