= Next Libyan presidential election =

- By 17 February 2027
President before election
Mohamed al-Menfi
Independent
Elected President
TBD

The next Libyan presidential election is scheduled to take place by 17 February 2027 to elect the President of Libya. The election will take place simultaneously with the parliamentary election. A presidential election in Libya had originally been planned for 10 December 2018, but was delayed due to Khalifa Haftar's Western Libya campaign. The election was thereafter rescheduled to be held on 24 December 2021 but was indefinitely postponed after the head of the High National Election Commission (HNEC) ordered the dissolution of the electoral committees nationwide. In June 2026, the heads of the HoR, the High Council of State and the Presidential Council agreed on holding elections by 17 February 2027.

== Background ==
In a surprise offensive on 3 March 2017, the Islamist-dominated Benghazi Defense Brigades seized a number of oil ports from the Libyan National Army-backed House of Representatives (HoR). On 7 March 2017, the ports were handed over to the Government of National Accord, prompting the House of Representatives to abandon the UN-brokered peace deal it had previously agreed to with that government, denouncing the BDB capture of the ports as "terrorist attacks". The House then called for Libya's electoral commission to make "all the necessary arrangements to prepare for presidential and parliamentary elections before February 2018".

== Election plans ==
=== 2018 ===
In May 2018, talks occurred in Paris, France, where leaders of the Government of National Accord and representatives of Haftar's Libyan National Army agreed on establishing a legal framework by 16 September to hold parliamentary and presidential elections on 10 December. The four people who agreed to deal were: Fayez al-Sarraj (head of the Government of National Accord), Khalifa Haftar (head of the Libyan National Army), Aguila Saleh Issa (head of the House of Representatives), and Khalid al-Mishri (head of the High Council of State). This was supported by the final report of the Centre for Humanitarian Dialogue for the preparatory phase of the Libyan National Conference, which stated that Libyans participating in the consultative process "expressed fatigue and frustration with the current political situation and called for an election or other major change to usher in a new system".

In July, French Foreign Minister Jean-Yves Le Drian visited Libya to speak with GNA Prime Minister Fayez al-Sarraj on making sure the elections went forward, and announcing that France donated US$1 million for the election. The Italian Prime Minister Giuseppe Conte stated in early August 2018 that he doubted that elections would be held at the end of the year, despite France's push, and Italian ambassador to Libya Giuseppe Perrone echoed this view. The Italian embassy in Tripoli later denied that Perrone was trying to delay the election after his statements were criticized by the Libyan House of Representatives. Ghassan Salamé, the United Nations representative in Libya, stated that an election in December 2018 would be unlikely due to the ongoing fighting.

In November 2018, major Libyan political figures attended the two-day Palermo Conference in an attempt to resolve the Libyan conflict, but without a breakthrough.

=== 2019 ===
One of the major aims of the Libyan National Conference, which was initially scheduled for 14–16 April 2019, but postponed by the start of Haftar's military operation to take control of Tripoli from the GNA, was to recommend methods and dates of the 2019 elections to the Libyan House of Representatives and High Council of State.

According to resolution 8/2013 of the General National Congress (GNC), the body responsible for the practical aspects of organising the elections is the High National Elections Commission (HNEC). HNEC is expected to follow the procedures outlined in resolution 17/2013 of the GNC. As of 2019, the HNEC Board consisted of Emad Alshadly al-Sayah, Rabab Mohammed Halab, Abdelhakim Alshaab Belkhair and Abubakr Ali Marda.

The 2019 Libyan local elections took place in 20 localities, prior to the parliamentary and presidential elections, in March and April 2019, with further planned elections in other towns during 2019. The local elections are coordinated by the Central Commission of Municipal Council Elections in close cooperation with HNEC.

In 2019, Libyan Speaker of the House Aguila Saleh announced that elections could be held in 2020.

=== 2020 ===
On 16 September 2020, Fayez al-Sarraj stated that he would step down from his position by the end of October 2020. This took place after the first month of the start of the 2020 Libyan protests in Tripoli, Benghazi and other cities across Libya.

=== 2021 ===
On 23 September 2021, Haftar temporarily withdrew his post from the command of the LNA for a potential run in the election. Under Libyan law, officials must suspend their current work three months before participating in the election.

Various postponements resulted from disputes about fundamental rules governing the election, including the voting timetable, the eligibility of the main candidates and the eventual powers of the next president and parliament.

Days before the first round was scheduled to take place, the election was already up in the air, with no official list of candidates presented to the public and no formal campaigning under way. On 22 December the parliament of Libya confirmed the postponement. The chairman of the election committee said, "After consulting the technical, judicial and security reports, we inform you of the impossibility of holding the elections on the date of 24 December 2021, provided for by the electoral law," without giving a new date. Foreign Policy summarized that the causes for the delay were that "the process was beleaguered by two interrelated issues: differences over the idea of holding a presidential election in the current context, and the resulting failure to reach the required consensus on a framework for elections".

=== 2022 ===
The United Kingdom, France, Germany, Italy and the United States urged Libya to quickly set a new date for the delayed presidential election. The HNEC insisted that the House of Representatives is responsible for setting the new date. Speaker of the House of Representatives Aguila Saleh said the election committee responsible for overseeing elections must set a "definitive" date for postponed presidential and legislative polls by the end of January.

The U.N.'s special adviser on Libya, Stephanie Williams, who has pursued a new election date, told the Associated Press that it was still "very reasonable and possible" for the country's 2.8 million voters to cast their ballots by June 2022 in line with the U.N.-brokered roadmap.

On 23 January 2022, interim Prime Minister Abdulhamid Dbeibeh called for a constitution to be established before holding the delayed presidential and parliamentary elections. A month later, on 22 February, Dbeibeh announced a plan to hold the elections in June 2022. He later proposed holding elections at the end of 2022.

Since then, the voting has not taken place and the plans have unraveled and left the country in crisis, although Dbeibeh is reported by his allies to be working on these issues. One reason given is the inability to agree on banning military personnel as well as dual citizens from running in the elections. In February 2023, the United Nations envoy to Libya, Abdoulaye Bathily, said that a new initiative to agree on elections was ongoing. Guma el-Gamaty, a Libyan politician and a member of UN-backed Libyan political dialogue process, opined that a solution to the crisis would be either bypassing the House of Representatives and the High Council of State by the Presidential Council as they seem to be reluctant on giving up power, or holding the parliamentary elections first.

=== 2025 ===
In November 2025, HNEC stated that after completing the 2024–2026 Libyan local elections in March 2026, and provided that funding was available and a procedure was agreed on by the existing two Libyan governments, it would be "ready to begin implementing presidential and parliamentary elections in mid-April 2026". HNEC called for UNSMIL to support the 6+6 Committee, a joint committee of the High Council of State (HCS) and the House of Representatives (HoR), to solve disagreements on the laws so that HNEC could proceed with the detailed organising procedures. In December 2025, a citizens' assembly type process among a diverse group of 137 Libyans, called the Structured Dialogue, was launched, with aims including the development of proposals for electoral processes.

=== 2026 ===
On 18 June 2026, the heads of the HoR, the High Council of State and the Presidential Council agreed on a plan for holding elections by 17 February 2027, based on the 6+6 electoral rules and the 13th Constitutional Amendment, and on other transitional procedures including a procedure for developing a permanent constitution.

== Electoral system ==
The President of Libya is elected using the two-round system; if no candidate receives a majority of the vote in the first round, a second round will be held.

2.83 million people were registered to vote in the Libyan election as of August 2021.

== Presidential candidates ==
=== 2021 ===
Registration for presidential candidates opened on 7 November 2021 and lasted until 22 November. Saif al-Islam Gaddafi, son of former Libyan leader Muammar Gaddafi, registered his candidacy on 14 November 2021. Khalifa Haftar, commander of the Libyan National Army, registered his candidacy on 16 November. Aref Nayed, Chairman of the Ihya Libya Party, submitted his candidacy on 17 November 2021. Prime Minister Abdul Hamid Dbeibeh registered his candidacy on 21 November. Abdel Moneim al-Houni, former foreign minister and founding member of the Libyan Revolutionary Command Council, registered his candidacy on 22 November. In total, 96 men and two women registered as candidates.

A preliminary list of 73 presidential candidates was released by the HNEC on 24 November. Twenty-five candidates were disqualified from the election, including Saif al-Islam Gaddafi, Nouri Abusahmain, Bashir Saleh Bashir, and Ali Zeidan. Gaddafi, Abusahmain, and Saleh were disqualified under Article 10/7 of the electoral law for having been convicted of a crime. Gaddafi was also disqualified under Article 17/5 for not providing a certificate showing a clean criminal record. Zeidan was disqualified under Article 10/2 for having more than one nationality and under Article 11 for not having 5000 supporters. According to the electoral law, any appeals against the disqualifications are to be decided by the judiciary.

On 28 November, the Tripoli Appeals Court rejected the candidacy of current prime minister Abdul Hamid Dbeibeh after accepting two appeals against his bid. The first appeal was filed by presidential candidates Aref Ali Nayed, Othman Abdeljalil, Mohammed Al-Muntasser, and Libyan Political Dialogue Forum members Ahmed Al-Sharkasi and Al-Saida Al-Yakoubi, while the second appeal was filed by presidential candidate Fathi Bashagha.

On 30 November, Libyan Field Marshal Khalifa Haftar was disqualified from the presidential election after the Zawiya Court of First Instance accepted an appeal against his candidacy.

On 1 December, four candidates disqualified by the HNEC, Abdul Hamid Dbeibeh, Nouri Abusahmain, Salama Al-Ghweil, and Fathi Benshatwan were placed back on the ballot by the Tripoli Court of Appeal.

On 2 December, Saif al-Islam Gaddafi was placed back on the ballot after the Sabha Court of Appeal accepted his appeal against his disqualification from the list of presidential candidates.

On 6 December 2021, Khalifa Haftar returned to the presidential election after the Tripoli Court of Appeal rejected a 30 November ruling by the lower Zawiya court.

=== 2026 ===
On 3 February 2026, Saif al-Islam Gaddafi was assassinated.

Following his assassination on February 3, the leaderless "green" movement faced internal fragmentation, as he was widely considered the only figure capable of fully unifying the various Gaddafi loyalist factions. This political vacuum prompted a major shift in September 2026, when supporters began organizing online campaigns and social media polls promoting his sister, Aisha Gaddafi, as the movement's new figurehead and a potential candidate for leadership.

=== Potential Candidates ===
Portrait	Candidate	Party	Reference for potential candidacy	Notes
	Aisha Gaddafi (born 1977)	Popular Front for the Liberation of Libya		Daughter of Former Leader Muammar Gaddafi

=== Candidates declared in 2021 ===
Portrait	Candidate	Party	Candidacy registration date	Notes
	Nouri Abusahmain (born 1956)	Ya Bilad		Former President of the General National Congress
	Salama Al-Ghweil	Independent		Minister of State for Economic Affairs
	Mohamed Ahmed Al Sharif (born 1937)	Independent	17 November 2021	Former head of the Libyan Islamic Society
	Mayouf Amarif	Independent		Professor at Sabha University
	Ibrahim Dabbashi (born 1950)	Independent		Former permanent representative of Libya to the United Nations
	Aref Ali Nayed (born 1962)	Ihya Libya	17 November 2021	Former Libyan Ambassador to the United Arab Emirates
	Hunayda al-Mahdi	Independent		Social sciences researcher
	Fathi Bashagha (born 1962)	Independent	18 November 2021	Former Minister of Interior of the Government of National Accord
	Fathi Benshatwan	Independent	16 November 2021	Former Minister of Energy (2004-2006)
	Abdul Hamid Dbeibeh (born 1959)	Libya Future	21 November 2021	Interim Prime Minister of Libya
	Khalifa Haftar (born 1943)	Independent	16 November 2021	Commander of the Libyan National Army
	Leila Ben Khalifa (born 1975)	National Movement Party	22 November 2021	Human Rights Activist and Head of National Movement Party
	Ahmed Maiteeq (born 1972)	Independent	18 November 2021	Former Deputy Prime Minister of the Government of National Accord, former Deputy Head of the Presidential Council
	Abdullah Ahmed Naker	Summit Party	16 November 2021	Former head of the Tripoli Revolutionaries Council
	Abdelmajeed Saif Al-Nasr (born 1957)	Independent		Former Libyan Ambassador to Morocco
	Aguila Saleh Issa (born 1944)	Independent	17 November 2021	Former Speaker of the Libyan House of Representatives
	Khalid Shakshak	Independent		Head of Audit Bureau
	Abdel Moneim al-Houni	Independent	22 November 2021	Former Foreign Minister (1974–1975), founding member of Libyan Revolutionary Command Council (1969–1975)

=== Deceased former candidates ===
Portrait	Candidate	Party	Candidacy registration date	Campaign end date	Notes
	Saif al-Islam Gaddafi (1972–2026)	Popular Front for the Liberation of Libya	14 November 2021	3 February 2026	Son of former Libyan leader Muammar Gaddafi. Assassinated in 2026.

== Opinion polling ==
=== First round ===
Poll source	Date(s) administered	Sample size (Note: Key: A – all adults RV – registered voters LV – likely voters V – unclear)	Margin of error	Dbeibeh	Gaddafi	Haftar	Bashagha	Undecided	Other
Institute	circa 2022	2115 (V)	–	5.1%	46.4%	5.7%	3.2%	22.3%	17.3%
Diwan Institute	1–5 December 2021	1106 (RV)	± 3%	49.7%	14%	7.3%	1.5%	25.5%	2.1%

=== Second round ===
==== Dbeibeh vs. Gaddafi ====
Poll source	Date(s) administered	Sample size	Margin of error	Dbeibeh	Gaddafi	Undecided	Abstention
Diwan Institute	1–5 December 2021	1106 (RV)	± 3%	63%	23%	8%	6%

==== Dbeibeh vs. Haftar ====
Poll source	Date(s) administered	Sample size	Margin of error	Dbeibeh	Haftar	Undecided	Abstention
Diwan Institute	1–5 December 2021	1106 (RV)	± 3%	73%	14%	8%	6%

==== Bashagha vs. Gaddafi ====
Poll source	Date(s) administered	Sample size	Margin of error	Bashagha	Gaddafi	Undecided	Abstention
Diwan Institute	1–5 December 2021	1106 (RV)	± 3%	27%	36%	8%	29%

==== Bashagha vs. Haftar ====
Poll source	Date(s) administered	Sample size	Margin of error	Bashagha	Haftar	Undecided	Abstention
Diwan Institute	1–5 December 2021	1106 (RV)	± 3%	30%	20%	9%	41%

==== Dbeibeh vs. Bashagha ====
Poll source	Date(s) administered	Sample size	Margin of error	Dbeibeh	Bashagha	Undecided	Abstention
Diwan Institute	1–5 December 2021	1106 (RV)	± 3%	75%	11%	7%	8%

==== Gaddafi vs. Haftar ====
Poll source	Date(s) administered	Sample size	Margin of error	Gaddafi	Haftar	Undecided	Abstention
Diwan Institute	1–5 December 2021	1106 (RV)	± 3%	38%	17%	8%	37%

== See also ==
- High National Election Commission
- municipal elections since 2018 (period of no presidential or parliamentary elections)
  - 2019–2021 Libyan local elections
  - 2024–2026 Libyan local elections
