= Libyan Political Dialogue Forum =

Intra-Libya series of meetings

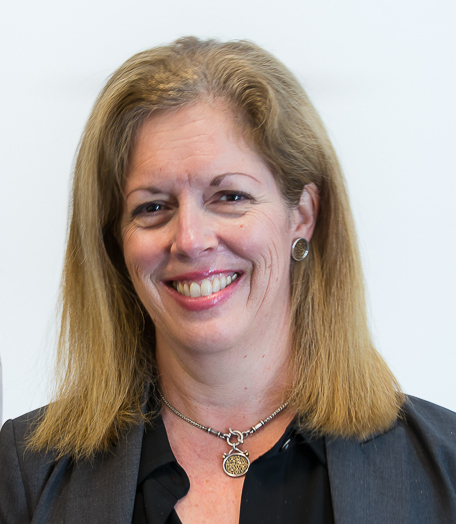
Stephanie Williams, as Acting Special Representative of the Secretary-General of the United Nations for Libya and deputy head of UNSMIL, launched the Libyan Political Dialogue Forum in late 2020.

The Libyan Political Dialogue Forum (LPDF) is an intra-Libyan political body involved in series of meetings started in late 2020, initially aiming to lead to Libyan elections, Libyan peace process and "democratic legitimacy of Libyan institutions", mainly taking place in the context of the Second Libyan Civil War. The LPDF continued in 2020, involving both Government of National Unity and the Government of National Stability as leading elements of the peace process.

== Background ==
Street protests of the Arab Spring and the NATO military intervention in 2011 turned into the First Libyan Civil War, led to the overthrow of the government and death of Libyan leader Muammar Gaddafi. Transitional arrangements were unstable, leading into the Second Libyan Civil War and rival Libyan governments. In late 2015, the Skhirat agreement proposed an institutional transition to unify Libyan state institutions. The Palermo Conference in November 2018 proposed to hold the Libyan National Conference and national elections in 2019. The April 2019 attack on Tripoli by the Libyan National Army led by Khalifa Haftar delayed the peace process, which was relaunched by Ghassan Salamé, head of the United Nations Support Mission in Libya (UNSMIL). Salamé's plan included a ceasefire, an international meeting of countries violating the arms embargo of United Nations Security Council Resolution 1973, and parallel intra-Libyan negotiation tracks divided into economic, military and political components.

== Definition ==
The Libyan Political Dialogue Forum started being named as such in September 2019 under Stephanie Williams' leadership of UNSMIL as its deputy head, after Salamé's resignation, continuing the political track of intra-Libyan dialogue. The aim of the LPDF was defined as being "to generate consensus on a unified governance framework and arrangements that will lead to the holding of national elections in the shortest possible timeframe in order to restore Libya's sovereignty and the democratic legitimacy of Libyan institutions."

=== Ineligibility condition ===
UNSMIL, based on a "recommendation from a great majority of Libyan constituencies", set a condition that participation in the LPDF required participants to declare themselves ineligible ("recuse themselves") from positions of political or "sovereign" power in the new institutions to be created.

== Groups ==
The Libyan Youth Track is a component of the LPDF aiming to include youth contributions to the political transition process in Libya. The Digital Dialogue included 1000 young Libyans inside Libya and in the Libyan diaspora. An 18 October 2020 meeting included 40 young Libyans "from various political, ethnic and tribal backgrounds". UNSMIL participants in the 18 October meeting informed participants of the military and economic tracks of the three-track intra-Libyan peace process, and of a human rights track. The participants agreed on recommendations for the LPDF and for the military and economic tracks of the peace negotiations, including specific requirements on the transitional political process. The participants chose their youngest woman member to present their recommendations to the LPDF. The recommendations were divided into eight groups: general comments on the LPDF, security and economic tracks; transitional period executive authority; the draft constitution; elections; the economy; the judicial issues; security issues; and a mechanism for communication with the LPDF. Several participants requested that recommendations of a youth meeting in southern Libya, the "Twiwah document", should be included in LPDF documentation.

== Meetings ==
The LPDF planned to start online virtual meetings on 26 October 2020, and to hold its first face-to-face meeting in Tunisia in early November 2020. Williams held meetings with Libyan mayors from the West, South and East of Libya in mid-October as part of the LPDF process aiming at wide inclusion of social and political groups.

A four-day LPDF Advisory Committee meeting was held from 13–16 January 2021 in Geneva, during which a proposal for the mechanism for selecting a unified executive authority was agreed upon. The following day, Williams participated in an online chat with 1000 Libyans, mostly located in diverse regions of Libya, and others from the diaspora. Polls taken during the online meeting found that 70% found the results of the Advisory Committee meeting to be positive; 76% supported holding national elections on 24 December 2021; 69% supported having a unified executive leading up to the elections; and all supported the 23 October 2020 ceasefire. Some participants expressed worries about "the 'status quo' party" obstructing changes.

== New executive authority ==
On 18 January 2021, 72 of the LPDF members participated in a vote on the 16 January proposal for a unified executive authority selection procedure. The proposal passed, since it attained more than the 63% decision threshold, with 51 voters in favour, 19 against, 2 absentions and 2 absences. The procedure includes electoral colleges, support from the West, East and South of Libya, a 60% initial threshold, and a 50% plus one second round threshold, for the positions in the Presidency Council and for the prime ministership.

On 5 February 2021, the procedure resulted in selecting Mohamed al-Menfi as President of the Presidential Council, Abdul Hamid al-Dabaib as Prime Minister, and Musa Al-Koni and Abdullah al-Lafi as Presidential Council members.
