= United Nations Security Council Resolution 2022 =

UN Security Council Resolution 2022
- Location of Libya
- Date: 2 December 2011
- Meeting no.: 6,673
- Code: S/RES/2022 (Document)
- Subject: The situation in Libya
- Voting summary: 15 voted for; None voted against; None abstained
- Result: Adopted

Security Council composition
- Permanent members: China; France; Russia; United Kingdom; United States
- Non-permanent members: Bosnia–Herzegovina; Brazil; Colombia; Germany; Gabon; India; Lebanon; Nigeria; Portugal; South Africa

United Nations Security Council Resolution 2022 was unanimously adopted on 2 December 2011, after recalling resolutions 2009 (also of 2011).

== Resolution ==
Stressing the importance of continued United Nations support for Libya’s transitional Government in addressing immediate priorities, the Security Council today extended the mandate of the United Nations Support Mission in Libya (UNSMIL) until 16 March 2012.

Unanimously adopting resolution 2022 (2011), the Council also decided that UNSMIL’s mandate should include, in coordination and consultation with the transitional Government, assisting and supporting national efforts to address the threat of proliferation of all arms and related material, in particular man-portable surface to air missiles.

Established by Council resolution 2009 (2011) of 16 September for an initial period of three months, the Mission’s original mandate was to help Libyan national efforts to restore public security, promote the rule of law, foster inclusive political dialogue and national reconciliation, and embark on constitution-making and electoral processes.

== See also ==
- List of United Nations Security Council Resolutions 2001 to 2100
