= Stephanie Turco Williams =

American diplomat

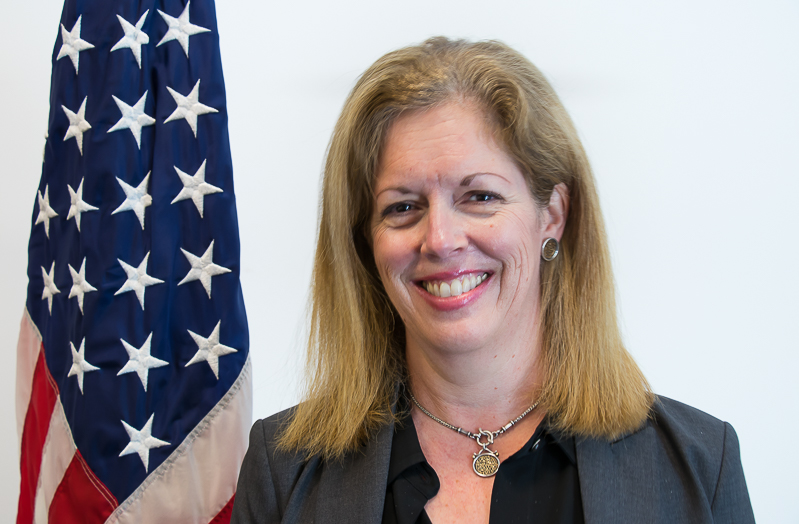
- Alma mater: University of Maryland; Center for Contemporary Arab Studies; National War College
- Occupation: Diplomat
- Employer: United Nations

Stephanie Turco Williams is an American diplomat. As of January 2020, Williams is the deputy head of the United Nations Support Mission in Libya (UNSMIL) for political affairs.

== Education and early career ==
After studying in her home country of the United States, Williams obtained a degree in economics and government relations in 1987 at the University of Maryland, College Park, a master's degree in Arab Studies in 1989 at the Center for Contemporary Arab Studies at Georgetown University, and a master's degree in national security in 2008 from the National War College.

Williams worked in the private sector in Bahrain before her employment by the United States Department of State.

== Diplomat ==
=== US diplomatic representative ===
Williams was the US Deputy Chief of Mission in Bahrain during 2010–2013. In this role, she was also the top US diplomat in Bahrain, the chargé d'affaires, for 10 months during the Bahraini uprising of 2011, during which she and Ludovic Hood were attacked in Bahraini newspapers and online media.

Williams was the US Deputy Chief of Mission in Jordan during 2013–2015 and in Iraq during 2016–2017.

In 2018, Williams was the US chargé d'affaires in Libya. In June 2018 during the Second Libyan Civil War, she met with senior Libyan political representatives and opposed the takeover of oil fields by the Libyan National Army (LNA) of Khalifa Haftar, calling for control of the fields to be returned to the internationally recognised Government of National Accord (GNA).

=== UNSMIL and Libyan peace process ===
In July 2018, Williams was appointed to represent the UN Secretary-General António Guterres as his Deputy Special Representative for political affairs in the United Nations Support Mission in Libya (UNSMIL). Middle East Monitor interpreted Williams' appointment as symbolising a "reshuffling of the cards", a strengthening of the US interest in Libya, in the context of French, UK, Italian and US interests in Libya.

On 11 January 2020, in her role as deputy head of UNSMIL for political affairs, Williams discussed with Khalid al-Mishri, head of the High Council of State (HCS), inviting the HCS to a late-January meeting between the HCS and the House of Representatives (HoR) in Geneva for the purposes of "resuming dialogue". Under the 3-point peace plan of UNSMIL head Ghassan Salamé, the third track of the third part of the plan would consist of intra-Libyan political negotiations. The first and second points of the plan consist of a ceasefire and an international meeting to enforce the arms embargo on Libya, while the third point includes economic, military/security and political tracks.

In late 2020, as effective head of UNSMIL, Williams oversaw the continuation of the economic, military and political tracks of intra-Libyan peace negotiations. The political track was renamed the Libyan Political Dialogue Forum (LPDF). Williams' mediation of the peace process included wide consultations, including meetings with Libyan mayors from the West, South and East of Libya as part of the LPDF process, scheduled to hold its first face-to-face meeting in Tunisia in early November 2020.
