= Libyan National Conference =

The Libyan National Conference was a planned meeting in Ghadames for organising elections and other components of a peace process in Libya. The conference was prepared over 18 months during 2018 and 2019 and planned to take place 14–16 April 2019. It was postponed in early April 2019 as a result the attack on Tripoli by the Libyan National Army led by Khalifa Haftar.

== Preparation ==
The Libyan National Conference was coordinated by Ghassan Salamé, head of the United Nations Support Mission in Libya (UNSMIL) over 18 months during 2018–2019. From April to July 2018, UNSMIL and the Centre for Humanitarian Dialogue organised 75 meetings in Libya and internationally with 7000 Libyans, three-quarters men and a quarter women. Half a million comments were collected on online social media from 130,000 online followers together with 2000 formal online "submissions". The November 2018 summary of the consultation stated that the main desires of Libyans were:

- "a united Libya capable of defending its borders and sovereignty";
- "a united military institution, free from political interference and committed to the national interest";
- "more fair distribution of resources through a decentralized state";
- "a government based on competence, not identity";
- "professional police services to ensure local security".

Salamé summarised the preparation of the conference as including "broad consultation with all the Libyan factions and groups, and after the painstaking and delicate handling of local, regional and international constraints and imperatives." The planned number of participants is about 120–150 Libyans from diverse sociopolitical Libyan groups, with no foreign groups represented.

Salamé stated in April 2019 that holding the conference was justified given that "the necessary conditions had been met to enable an effective solution to the crisis in Libya through a political settlement, the establishment of a national charter and commitments that could be given to place the country on the path of recovery, towards peace, restoration of unity and sovereignty and a decent life for the Libyan people." The holding of the National Conference was supported by the United Nations Security Council.

== Aims ==
The conference was planned to only make recommendations, with no executive powers, with the aim of not competing with existing Libyan political bodies such as the Presidential Council, the House of Representatives, the High Council of State.

Specific proposals that should result from the conference include methods and dates for the 2019 presidential and parliamentary elections. These would be recommended to the House of Representatives and High Council of State, who would be responsible for implementing these.

== Postponement and relaunch with new name ==
The National Conference was postponed in early April 2019 as a result of the military actions constituting the 2019–20 Western Libya campaign.

In late 2020, a series of meetings similar to the originally planned National Conference was initiated, with the new name being the Libyan Political Dialogue Forum.
