= Aref Ali Nayed =

Libyan islamic scholar and diplomat (born 1962)

- عارف علي النايض
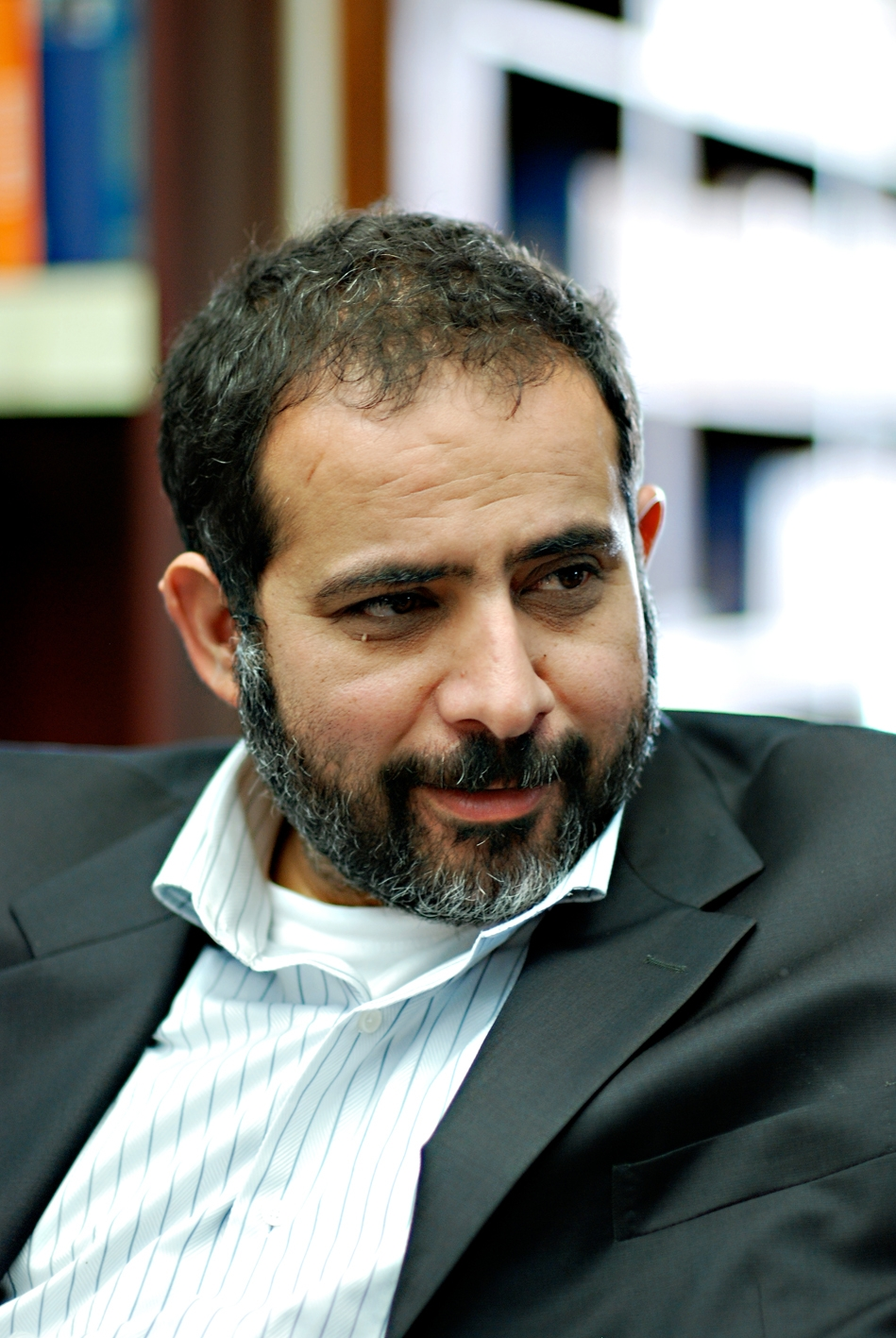
- Nayed in 2009

Leader of Ihya Libya
- Incumbent
- Assumed office 24 August 2017
- Preceded by: Party established

Libyan Ambassador to the United Arab Emirates
- In office June 2011 – October 2016
- Appointed by: National Transitional Council
- Prime Minister: Mahmoud Jibril; Ali Tarhouni (Acting); Abdurrahim El-Keib (Acting); Ali Zeidan; Abdullah al-Thinni
- Preceded by: Omar al Ghanai
- Succeeded by: Abdul-Hamid Farhat

Personal details
- Born: 1962 (age 63–64) Benghazi, Kingdom of Libya
- Party: Ihya Libya
- Education: University of Guelph; University of Toronto; Pontifical Gregorian University
- Occupation: Academic; businessman; politician; diplomat; writer
- Website: http://arefnayed.com

Aref Ali Nayed (Arabic: عارف علي النايض, romanized: ʿArif ʿAli al-Nayid; born 1962) is a Libyan Islamic scholar, businessman and politician who served as Libyan Ambassador to the United Arab Emirates from 2011 to 2016. Nayed is the founder and director of Kalam Research & Media (KRM), based in Tripoli, Libya and Dubai. Until the outbreak of the revolution in Libya, he lectured on Islamic theology, logic, and spirituality at the restored Uthman Pasha Madrassa in Tripoli, and supervised graduate students at the Islamic Call College there.

Before the liberation of Tripoli in 2011, he was appointed by the National Transitional Council as the coordinator of the Tripoli Taskforce. When Tripoli was liberated in late August 2011, the remit was broadened and he was made the lead coordinator of the Libya Stabilization Team. Earlier in the year, he was the coordinator for the Support Offices of the Executive Team of the National Transitional Council (NTC) of Libya. He is also the secretary of the Network of Free Ulema – Libya. According to the Royal Aal al-Bayt Institute for Islamic Thought, Nayed is ranked 50th among the top 500 most influential Muslims in the world.

== Early life ==
Aref Ali Nayed was born in Benghazi in 1962 and raised in Tripoli. In 1978, the Nayed family property and businesses were confiscated by Gaddafi and the family fled Libya, relocating to Costa Rica, Hong Kong, and finally the United States. He later went to Canada, to study at the insistence of his father, and received his BSc in engineering from the University of Guelph in Ontario. At Guelph, he became deeply interested in philosophy and science and stayed on to complete an MA in the Philosophy of Science, and then a PhD in Hermeneutics. His doctoral work on operational hermeneutics was published in 2011 by Kalam Research and Media. Pursuing further his academic interests he studied Islamic philosophy and theology at the University of Toronto and then specialised in Christian theology at the Pontifical Gregorian University in Rome.

He went on to take up several academic positions and was Professor at the Pontifical Institute of Arab and Islamic Studies in Rome, and the International Institute for Islamic Thought and Civilization in Malaysia.

In the 1990s, he returned to Libya and headed an IT company with offices in Tripoli, Benghazi, Sharjah, and Hyderabad.

As the former Libyan government began lifting restrictions on religious teaching, he helped restore and reopen the famous Othman Pasha Madrasa in the Old Madina of Tripoli. This madrasa was a renowned centre for theological and spiritual instructions and many leading Tripolitanian scholars of the past were associated with it. Nayed taught theology, logic, and spirituality there, until February 2011, when the political unrest in Tripoli escalated and the former regime's forces committed widespread violence, killings, and summary arrests of those supporting the Free Libyan movement.

Nayed is also Senior Advisor to the Cambridge Inter-Faith Programme; Fellow of the Royal Aal Al-Bayt Institute in Jordan; and was appointed to the Board of Advisors of the prestigious Templeton Foundation.

== Career ==
From 1984 to 1998, Nayed was an educator, teaching in universities in North America, Europe, North Africa, Asia, and the Middle East. In 1998, Nayed interrupted his academic career at the behest of his father and founded Agathon Systems Limited/Alada, an engineering and technology enterprise focused on building data centers, networking, and banking infrastructures across Libya. Prior to the Libyan Revolution in 2011, Agathon represented 33 global technology companies in Libya, including IBM, Citrix, NCR, Nortel, Microsoft and APC. Nayed directly oversaw the implementation of projects across Libya and deployed some of the earliest projects in the automation of both the oil and banking sectors of Libya. Nayed's companies introduced ATM systems across the country and was responsible for the national payment system for the Central Bank of Libya. The company has worked with every bank in Libya and built data networks for Libya's National Oil (NOC) and National Utility (GECOL) companies, and created data centers in Libya for Schlumberger, BP and WesternGeco. Alada built the company-wide network for Total. Through Alada's projects, NAted trained over 200 young Libyan engineers and helped incubate over seven IT and communications businesses on behalf of former employees.

Dr Aref Nayed, Chairman of the Ihya Libya Party submitted his documents to officially declare his candidacy to run for the Presidential elections scheduled for 24 December 2021 at the headquarters of the Election Commission (HNEC) in Benghazi.

== Philanthropy ==
From 1990 Nayed devoted himself and his resources to philanthropy and social activism in Libya and abroad. He has worked to preserve traditional knowledge, promote learning and build capacities of young Libyans. Nayed endowed libraries in Libya, Mali, Turkey, and Tajikistan. With his own funds, Nayed restored the historic Uthman Pasha Madrassa and its library in Tripoli. Nayed established the first university library in Bani Walid and another 25,000 volume library in Tripoli. Nayed worked on the publication and dissemination of writings promoting the restoration of Libya's cultural heritage.

Nayed also funded the restoration of the Al Ahly Sports, Cultural, and Social Club in Benghazi, as well as other sports clubs across Libya. Nayed serves as chairman of the Board of Directors of Al Ahly SC in Benghazi.

== Kalam Research & Media ==
In, 2009 Nayed founded Kalam Research & Media based in Tripoli, Tobruk, and Bayda in Libya, and Dubai, UAE. Kalam Research & Media was formed as a collegial think tank and training center dedicated to research, education, content development and capacity building in Islamic theology, philosophy, and wisdom.

== Libyan Revolution ==
Nayed joined the Libyan Revolution on 19 February 2011, after joining in popular demonstrations in Tripoli. He formed the Network of Free Ulema composed of Libyan scholars, which called for the immediate end to killings by the regime. When the regime ignored the call and continued killing protestors, the Network of Free Ulema sanctioned open rebellion.

When the National Transition Council (NTC), Free Libya's de facto government, was established in Benghazi on 27 February, Nayed was called upon to set up and supervise the Support Team to the NTC Executive Office. During the early days of the revolution, Nayed was instrumental in securing regional and international support and played a major role in convincing the United Arab Emirates to recognize the new Libyan government.

Nayed subsequently was appointed to form and lead the Tripoli Task Force for the liberation of the capital, a role that was broadened by the NTC and Stabilization Team to secure the nation's critical infrastructure and ensure that civilians were safe and secured and had access to essential utilities and services. In this role, Nayed led efforts to unfreeze Libyan assets and gain international humanitarian assistance to meet the immediate food, water, and healthcare needs of Libyans most affected by conflict.

== Ambassador ==
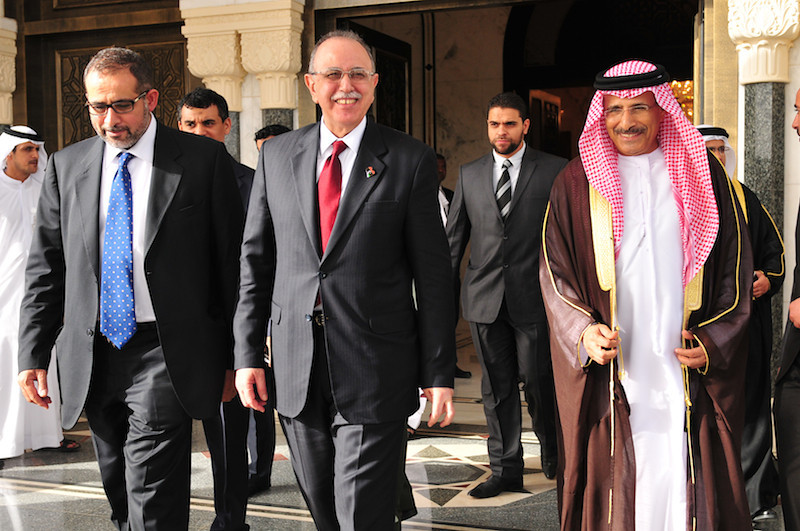
Ministerial visit to the UAE

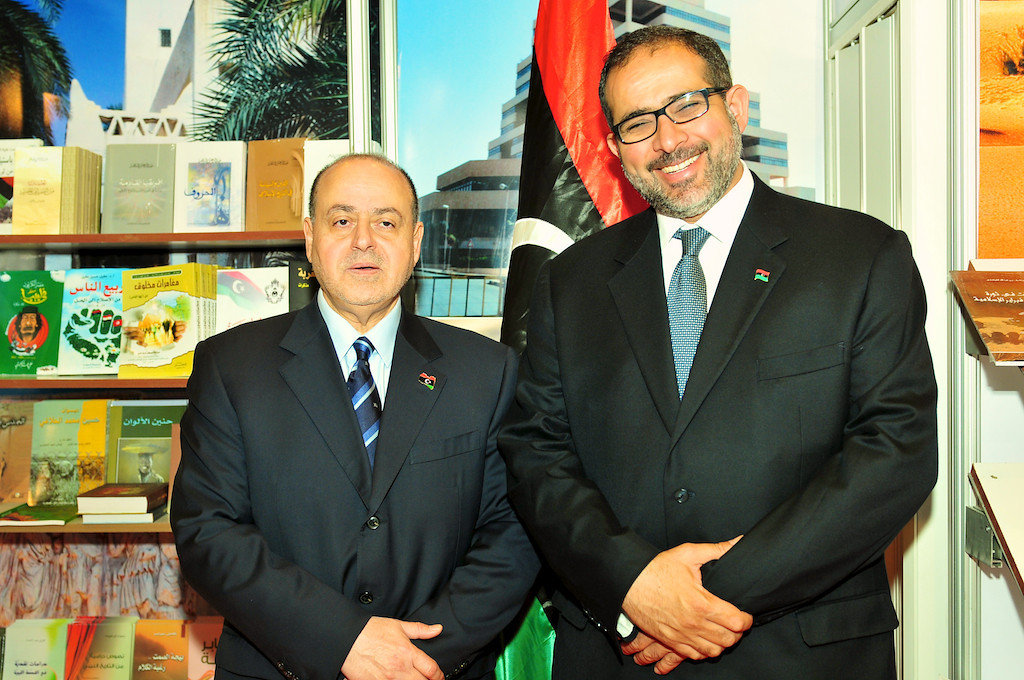
Libyan Minister of Culture at the Abu Dhabi Book Fair

In August 2011 Nayed was the first diplomat appointed by the post-Qaddafi Libyan government, serving as Ambassador to the United Arab Emirates. When elections were held in 2012, Nayed submitted his resignation, a condition he insisted on at his appointment. His resignation was rejected by the Libyan government. Since that time, Nayed has resigned five times, each resignation being rejected by successive Libyan governments. During his tenure as Ambassador, Nayed has taken many salaries and exercised diplomatic privileges.

== Education ==
Nayed brought together a selection of major international universities and training establishments to set up the Libyan Institute for Advanced Studies. The institute is focused in building capacity among Libya's young people in areas that would benefit the country's future.

== Theological ==
As a Muslim theologian educated in Maliki jurisprudence and classical Sufi doctrine, Nayed studied Christian theology at the Pontifical Gregorian University in Rome and served as professor at the Pontifical Institute of Arab and Islamic Studies in Rome, and the International Institute for Islamic Thought and Civilization in Malaysia.

Nayed is one of the leading Muslim figures in the field of inter-faith relations, and has been involved in various inter-faith initiatives since 1987, including A Common Word Between Us and You, of which he was one of the original signatories. Nayed was part of the Muslim delegation at the seminal Common Word bilateral meetings between Muslims and Christians at the Vatican, Lambeth Palace, Cambridge, Yale, and Georgetown. In 2006 when Pope Benedict XVI made controversial comments on Islam in Regensburg, Germany, Nayed was one of the 138 Muslim scholars who drafted a letter inviting Catholic-Muslim dialogue. Nayed also took part in a conference of clerics who reinterpreted the 14th-century scholar Ibn Taymiyya's celebrated fatwa on jihad, arguing radical Islamists who use it to justify killing are misguided.

Until the outbreak of the Libyan Revolution, Nayed lectured on Islamic theology, logic, and spirituality at the restored Uthman Pasha Madrassa in Tripoli, and supervised graduate students at the Islamic Call College. In addition, Nayed has written extensively on Islamic theology.

Nayed is a senior advisor to the Cambridge Inter-Faith Programme, a Fellow of the Royal Aal Al-Bayt Institute for Islamic Thought in Jordan, and was appointed to the board of advisers at the Templeton Foundation.

== Libyan Institute for Advanced Studies ==
In 2012, Nayed founded the Libyan Institute for Advanced Studies (LIAS), the first private research, advisory, and education institute established after the revolution. LIAS has offices in Tripoli, Bayda, and Tobruk as well as Dubai. LIAS is focused on building capacity among Libya's young people to help them contribute to their communities and country. LIAS has eight specialized faculties and an affiliated business incubator. It offers advisory services and courses ranging from professional education to degree programs for professional and personal development.

LIAS departments include Libyan Studies, Stabilization Studies, Strategic Studies, Youth and Gender, Government, Management, Media, and Sustainability.

== Countering violent extremism in Libya ==
As an internationally respected theologian, Nayed has been one of the most outspoken critics of Islamist ideologues and extremists. Nayed was among the first public figures to identify Islamists as the main destabilizing force in post-revolution Libya and as the primary enablers of the ISIL and other extremist groups. Nayed has written and lectured extensively against extremist ideologies and cooperates with global initiatives to repudiate extremism and educate Muslims on Islam as a compassionate and tolerant religion. Nayed has supported the initiatives led by Sheikh Abdallah Bin Bayyah.

In February 2015, Nayed visited Washington D.C. to warn American lawmakers against the threat of the ISIL in Libya.

== Personal life ==
Nayed is married to Nadia Hashani from Misrata; they have three children.

== Publications ==
=== Books ===
- Operational Hermeneutics: Interpretation as the Engagement of Operational Artifacts; KRM Press, Dubai (2011);
- The Author’s Intention; Co-authored with Jeff Mitscherling and Tanya Ditommaso; Lexington Books (2004)
- Vatican Engagements: A Muslim Theologian’s Journey in Muslim-Catholic Dialogue; KRM Press, Dubai (2016);
- Radical Engagements;Essays on Religion, Extremism, Politics and Libya; KRM Press, Dubai (forthcoming 2017)
- The Future of Muslim Theology (to be published by Blackwell in parallel with The Future of Jewish Theology by Stephen Kepnes and The Future of Christian Theology by David F. Ford.

=== Monographs ===
- "GROWING ECOLOGIES OF PEACE, COMPASSION AND BLESSING: A Muslim Response to 'A Muscat Manifesto'"
- "DUTIES OF PROXIMITY: Towards a Theology of Neighbourliness"
- "BUILDING PEACE: The Approach of Sheikh Abdullah Bin Bayyah and the Somalia Declaration"
- "Beyond Fascism: A New Libya Actualized"
- "Libya: From Revolutionary Legitimacy to Constitutional Legitimacy"
- "Overcoming ISIS in Libya: A Disaster Recovery Plan"
- "ISIS in Libya: Winning the Propaganda War"
