= Bernardino León =

Spanish diplomat and politician (born 1964)

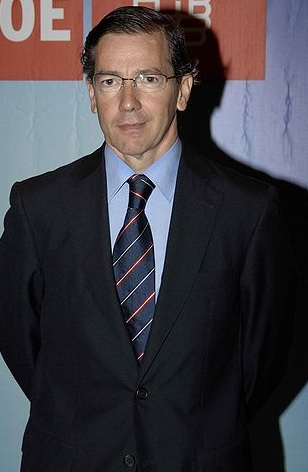

President of the Emirates Diplomatic Academy
- Incumbent
- Assumed office December 2015

Special Representative and Head of the United Nations Support Mission in Libya
- In office 14 August 2014 – 3 November 2015
- Preceded by: Tarek Mitri
- Succeeded by: Martin Kobler

Special Representative for the Southern Mediterranean Region
- In office 18 July 2011 – 30 June 2014

Secretary General at the office of the Prime Minister of Spain
- In office 14 April 2008 – 22 July 2011
- Prime Minister: José Luis Rodríguez Zapatero
- Preceded by: Ramón Gil-Casares
- Succeeded by: Ángel Lossada

6th Secretary of State for Foreign Affairs
- In office 19 April 2004 – 14 April 2008

Personal details
- Born: Bernardino León Gross; 20 October 1964 (age 61) Málaga, Spain
- Party: PSOE
- Education: Universidad de Málaga

Bernardino León Gross (born in Málaga, 20 October 1964) is a Spanish diplomat and politician and former United Nations Special Representative and Head of the United Nations Support Mission in Libya. Prior to this appointment by United Nations Secretary-General Ban Ki-moon, he served as the European Union Special Representative (EUSR) for the Southern Mediterranean. León is a former Secretary General at the office of the Spanish Prime Minister, Sherpa for the G20 and Spanish Secretary of State for Foreign Affairs. His diplomatic career has mainly been devoted to the Arab world.

== The European Union Special Representative (EUSR) for the Southern Mediterranean ==
Bernardino León was appointed the European Union Special Representative for the Southern Mediterranean by the Council of the European Union on 18 July 2011. As the EUSR, Bernardino León played a leading role in enhancing the EU's support to the countries in the Southern Mediterranean undergoing a democratic transition. As defined in the Council Decision 2011/424/CFSP, the main political objectives of the EUSR relate to the recent developments in the Arab world calling for a strengthened and comprehensive response from the EU, supporting the democratic transitions in the countries in the Southern Mediterranean region. The mandate sets out three policy objectives: 1. Enhancing the Union's political dialogue with the Southern Mediterranean, 2. Contributing to the response of the Union strengthening democracy and institution building in the countries, 3. Enhancing the Union's effectiveness, presence and visibility in the region and in relevant international forums.

The EUSR has through coordinating high-level EU Task Forces contributed to the response of the EU in strengthening democratic transition in those countries in the Southern Mediterranean. The Task Force constitute a new kind of European diplomacy, mobilising all EU resources and working with both public and private sectors to support the democratic transition through support to institution building, rule of law, good governance, respect for human rights, economic reforms and regional cooperation. Acting as a multiplier and a catalyst, the Task Force is a tool deepens the EUs partnership with the countries in a results-oriented and differentiated way, involving all EU institutions (EEAS, the Commission services as well as the EIB). Exchanges with civil society organisations and members of parliament are central to the work of TF. EU Task Forces have been conducted with:

– Tunisia (28–29 September 2011) co-chaired by the High Representative Catherine Ashton and the Tunisian Prime Minister Béji Caïd Essebsi.

– Jordan (22 February 2012) co-chaired by the High Representative Catherine Ashton and the Jordanian Prime Minister Awn Shawkat Al-Khasawneh

– Egypt (13–14 November 2012) co-chaired by the High Representative Catherine Ashton and the Egyptian Foreign Minister Mohamed Kamel Amr.

== Diplomatic career ==
In 1998, at the outset of the EU Common Foreign and Security Policy, León became personal adviser to the EU Special Representative for the Middle East Peace Process, Miguel Angel Moratinos, at the time when the Wye Accords were being negotiated. He remained until 2001, during the Taba Accords negotiation and the set up of the Quartet on the Middle East. His mission was primarily focused in Egypt, Jordan, Lebanon, Syria, Israel and Palestine.

In 2001, León became head of the Three Cultures of the Mediterranean Foundation, a Moroccan-Spanish institution for dialogue and mutual understanding among the different cultures and religions in the Mediterranean. During this period, León worked very closely with governments and civil society representatives. That was the case of Tunisia, for instance, where he worked with members of the opposition.

In 2003, Edward Said, Daniel Barenboim and Bernardino León, founded the Barenboim-Said Foundation, which focused on the West Eastern Divan orchestra for young musicians from the Arab countries of the Middle East and Israel.

From 2004 to 2008, León was the Secretary of State for Foreign Affairs at the Spanish Ministry of Foreign Affairs and Cooperation. During this time, León was instrumental in the launch of the Alliance of Civilizations, a prestigious initiative proposed by Prime Minister of Spain, José Luis Rodríguez Zapatero, at the 59th General Assembly of the United Nations (UN) in 2005. It was co-sponsored by the Turkish Prime Minister, Recep Tayyip Erdoğan. The initiative galvanized international action against extremism through the forging of international, intercultural and interreligious dialogue and cooperation. The Alliance places a particular emphasis on defusing tensions between the Western and Islamic worlds. During this period, he worked closely with Arab countries and was particularly involved in the negotiations between Cyprus and Turkey.

In 2008 Bernardino León was appointed Secretary General at the Office of the Spanish Prime Minister José Luis Rodríguez Zapatero, which involved, among other responsibilities, the role as the main foreign policy advisor to the Prime Minister. In 2009 he was appointed, keeping his post as Secretary General of the Presidency, Sherpa for the G20, a forum in which he participated in all negotiations and summits and involved holding a very active role in major international economic and financial issues.

In 2011, León was appointed the European Union Special Representative for the Southern Mediterranean by the EU High Representative and Vice President.

On 14 August 2014, Mr. León was appointed United Nations Special Representative and Head of the United Nations Support Mission in Libya, and took office on 14 September 2014, succeeding Mr. Tarek Mitri of Lebanon. He was in turn succeeded by Mr. Martin Kobbler of Germany.

=== Libya peace process controversy ===
Late in his term as Special Representative, León was criticised after leaked emails showed that he had had secret and cordial negotiations with the United Arab Emirates government whilst leading sensitive political negotiations with Libyan authorities in his role as a Special Representative of the United Nations in the Libya peace process, during the phase of the Skhirat agreement. According to the leaked emails, León was offered a highly lucrative position as the First Director General of the Emirates Diplomatic Academy, which he subsequently accepted. The situation threatened peace talks at the time when press reports based on the leaked emails indicated that the UAE was violating United Nations arms embargoes on Libya.
