= Libyan peace process =

Attempts to resolve the crisis in Libya

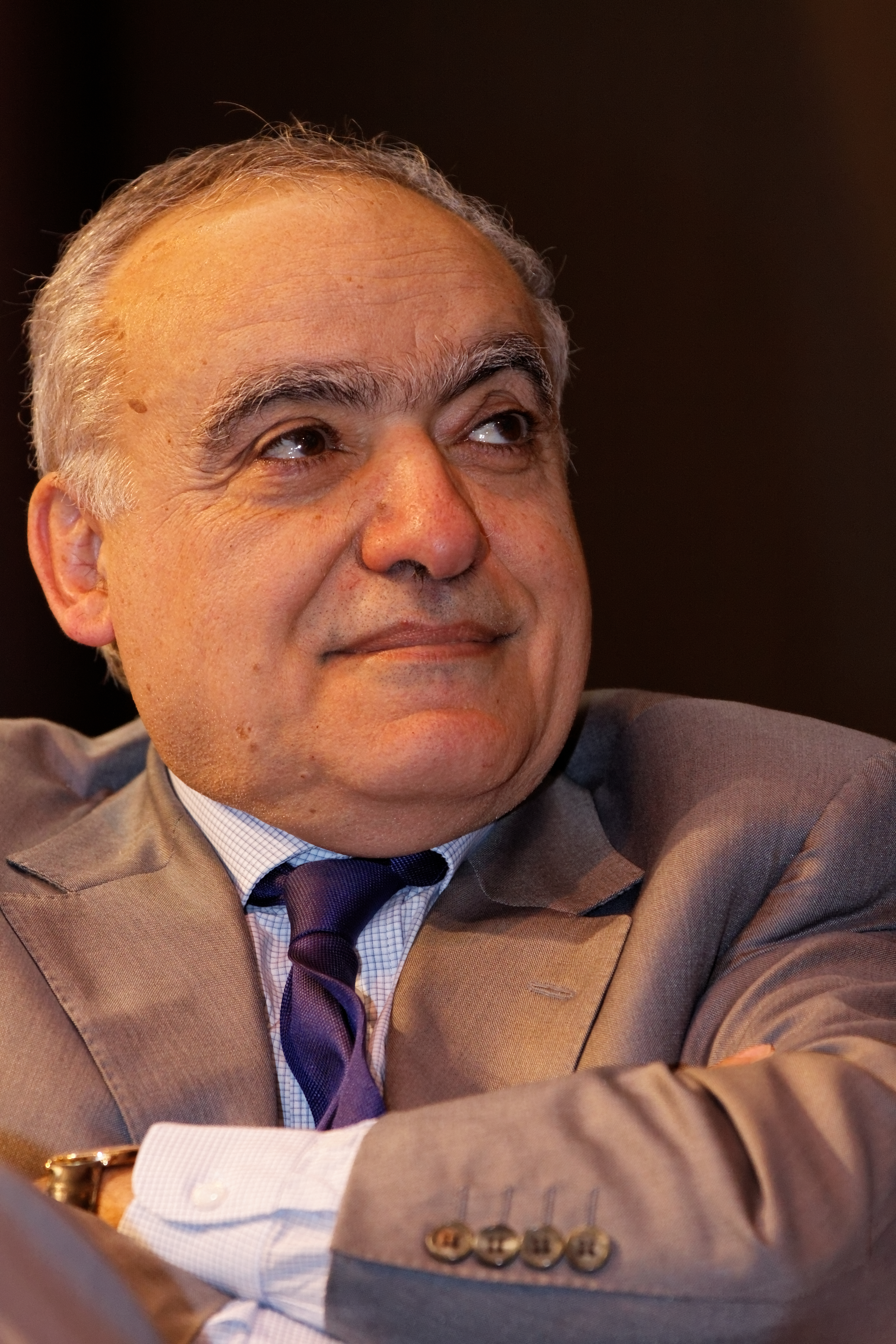
UNSMIL head Ghassan Salamé proposed a ceasefire/arms embargo/intra-Libyan dialogue three-point peace plan in 2019

The Libyan peace process is a series of meetings, agreements and actions that aim to resolve the Second Libyan Civil War and the coexistence of rival governments since 2022. Among these were the Skhirat agreement of December 2015 and the plans for the Libyan National Conference in April 2019 that were delayed because of the 2019–20 Western Libya campaign.

In July 2019, Ghassan Salamé, the head of the United Nations Support Mission in Libya (UNSMIL), proposed a three-point peace plan, to consist of a ceasefire, an international meeting of implicated countries for enforcing the arms embargo and an internal Libyan conference composed of economic, military and political "tracks". A several-day ceasefire took place on Eid al-Adha in mid-August 2019 and a ceasefire was declared by both the Government of National Accord (GNA) and the Libyan National Army (LNA) to start on 12 January 2020. A conference between representatives of Mediterranean Basin powers implicated in the Libyan armed conflict as well as Algeria, the Republic of Congo and major world powers took place in Berlin on 19 January 2020, declaring a 55-point list of Conclusions, creating a military 5+5 GNA+LNA followup committee, and an International Follow-up Committee to monitor progress in the peace process. In the intra-Libyan component of the 3-point process, the economic track was launched on 6 January 2020 in a meeting in Tunis between a diverse selection of 19 Libyan economic experts. The military track of the intra-Libyan negotiations started on 3 February with the 5+5 Libyan Joint Military Commission meeting in Geneva, between 5 senior military officers selected by the GNA and 5 selected by the LNA leader Khalifa Haftar. A major aim was to negotiate detailed monitoring to strengthen the 12 January ceasefire. The intra-Libyan political track was started on 26 February 2020 in Geneva. Salamé resigned from his UNSMIL position in early March 2020.

A 21 August 2020 announcement by GNA leader Fayez al-Sarraj and HoR speaker Aguila Saleh declared a ceasefire, lifting of the oil blockade, the holding of parliamentary and presidential elections in March 2021, and a new joint presidential council to be guarded by a joint security force in Sirte. Followup meetings took place in Montreux on 7–9 September with support from UNSMIL and the Centre for Humanitarian Dialogue and, between five GNA and five House of Representatives (HoR) members on 11 September, in Bouznika. Both meetings appeared to achieve consensus.

The three-track intra-Libyan negotiations, chaired by Stephanie Williams of UNSMIL, continued following the August ceasefire and September Montreux meeting, with the political track evolving into the Libyan Political Dialogue Forum, and the military track leading to a 23 October 2020 agreement on a permanent ceasefire.

== 2015 Skhirat agreement ==
During the first half of 2015, the United Nations facilitated a series of negotiations seeking to bring together the rival governments of Libya and warring militias tearing Libya apart. The U.N. representative to Libya reconvened delegations from Libya's rival governments on 8 June 2015 to present the latest draft proposal for a unity government for the war-torn country. After a warning one week earlier that the country was running out of money and had risked ceasing to be a functional state, Bernardino León urged at a ceremony in Morocco that the Libyans approve the fourth version of the proposal. On 8 October 2015, Bernardino León held a press conference in which the names of several potential members of a unified government were announced.

In November 2015, The Guardian claimed that Bernardino León's neutrality had been compromised by his having negotiated and accepted a £1,000-a-day job to head a thinktank in the United Arab Emirates during the time of his role as the main UN peace negotiator in Libya.

A meeting between the rival governments was held at Auberge de Castille in Valletta, Malta on 16 December 2015. The meeting was delayed for a few days after the representatives from the Tobruk government initially failed to show up. The leader of the Tripoli government, Nouri Abusahmain, announced that they "will not accept foreign intervention against the will of the Libyan people," while the leader of the Tobruk government Aguila Saleh Issa called on the international community to "allow [them] time to form an effective unity government". Representatives from both governments also met officials from the United Nations, Italy, the United States and Russia in a conference in Rome.

On 17 December 2015, delegates from both rival governments signed a peace deal backed by the UN in Skhirat, Morocco, although there was opposition to this within both factions. The Government of National Accord was formed as a result of this agreement, and its first meeting took place in Tunis on 2 January 2016.

On 17 December 2017, general Khalifa Haftar declared the Skhirat agreement void.

== 2018 Palermo Conference ==
The Palermo Conference was a two-day international conference which took place in Palermo, Italy on 12–13 November 2018 to support the holding of the Libyan National Conference and national elections in 2019.

== 2019 Libyan National Conference ==
A meeting, called the Libyan National Conference, was planned in Ghadames for organising elections and a peace process in Libya. The conference was prepared over 18 months during 2018 and 2019 and was planned to take place 14–16 April 2019. It was postponed in early April 2019 as a result of the attack on Tripoli by the Libyan National Army under the command of Khalifa Haftar.

== Salamé three-point peace plan ==
On 29 July 2019, Ghassan Salamé, head of the United Nations Support Mission in Libya (UNSMIL), proposed a three-point peace plan to the United Nations Security Council (UNSC), which would "require consensus in [the UNSC] and amongst the Member States who exert influence on the ground" and require Libyans "to listen to their better angels" rather than "[fight] the wars of others and in so doing [destroy] their country." Salamé resigned from his UNSMIL position in early March 2020, stating that the governments of countries involved in the Libyan conflict had failed to support the peace process, with numerous violations of the arms embargo.

Salamé's plan included:

1. a truce between the Government of National Accord (GNA) and Libyan National Army (LNA) and their associated militias on Eid al-Adha, along with confidence-building measures such as prisoner exchanges, releasing arbitrarily detained prisoners and exchanging the remains of victims of the conflict;
2. an international meeting of countries implicated in the conflict, to stop the fighting, implement the legally existing arms embargo of United Nations Security Council Resolution 1973 (2011), and promote the following of international human rights law;
3. a Libyan meeting similar to the originally planned Libyan National Conference; which should include three tracks:
  - an economic track, which started on 6 January 2020 among 19 diverse Libyan economic experts meeting in Tunis, and continued with a 9–10 February Cairo meeting which defined the terms of reference to create a Libyan Expert Economic Commission;
  - a military track, which the 5+5 Libyan Joint Military Commission started during 3–8 February 2020 in Geneva, and continued 18–23 February in Geneva leading to a draft ceasefire agreement; and
  - a political track for negotiation by 13 HoR members from the Tobruk and Tripoli based groups, 13 HCS members and 14 independents, which started with 20 out of the 40 participants on 26 February in Geneva.

=== Ceasefires ===
The first point of the Salamé three-point peace plan is a ceasefire.

==== Eid al-Adha truce ====
A truce took place on Eid al-Adha in mid-August 2019. Salamé described it as a "substantial reduction in violence along the main fronts in southern Tripoli and elsewhere" with "some violations" and that "broadly speaking, the truce held for the duration of the Eid festivities." Salamé stated to the UNSC that UNSMIL was working on encouraging confidence-building measures and a longer term ceasefire.

==== 12 January 2020 ceasefire ====
In early January 2020, Turkish and Russian leaders proposed a Libyan ceasefire starting on 12 January. Russian president Vladimir Putin contacted United Arab Emirates (UAE) and Egyptian leaders to pressure Haftar into accepting a ceasefire from the side of the LNA. An LNA spokesperson stated on 12 January that the LNA would implement the ceasefire. The Libya Observer interpreted the LNA's decision to be a result of Russian pressure. Both sides claimed to have implemented the ceasefire, and that the other side had violated it.

On 15 January, Turkish Defence Minister Hulusi Akar stated that although Haftar had not signed a ceasefire deal in Moscow that al-Sarraj had signed, it was "too early" to judge if the ceasefire had failed. Libya Herald reported a "relative calm" with "some ceasefire violations" each day since 12 January. On 16 January, German representatives stated that Haftar was committed to the ceasefire.

On 30 January, UNSMIL had documented 110 violations of the 12 January ceasefire.

=== Berlin conference ===
The second point of the Salamé three-point peace plan is to stop the arms flow into Libya, with an international conference to pressure countries implicated in the conflict to stop fuelling it.

==== Preparations ====
On 4 September 2019, Salamé stated to the UNSC that he had visited several countries in the region with the aim of organising an international conference that would fulfil the second element of his peace plan. He stressed that a central theme of the meeting would be respect for the arms embargo, a commitment to non-interference in Libya, and a commitment to supporting Libyans' view of the conflict and Libyans' preferences for a political solution to the conflict. Salamé argued that "the idea that war should be given a chance and that a military solution is at all possible is quite simply a chimera." In mid-September, a preparation meeting was held in Berlin between representatives of Germany, the United States (US), France, United Kingdom (UK), Italy, Russia, Egypt, the United Arab Emirates (UAE), Turkey, the Arab League, the European Union (EU), and the African Union (AU). According to Michel Cousins (co-founder of Libya Herald), as of early October, the plan was that no Libyans would participate in the conference, and participation of Qatar, Algeria and Tunisia remained unclear. On 8 October, Salamé stated that all countries concerned had to be invited "without any exclusion".

The third Senior Official Meeting in preparation for the Berlin meeting took place on 21 October. On 27 October, during a visit by the German Foreign Minister Heiko Maas to Zuwara to discuss preparations for the Berlin conference, Salamé stated, "The Berlin conference efforts are very serious and are backed by very significant stakeholders. There must be a committee that would be tasked with following up on the implementation of all understandings and this is something all previous conferences have lacked." The Libyan Foreign Minister, Mohamed Taha Siala, said that there should be a ceasefire and a retreat of LNA forces before negotiations. Maas stated that the peace process should be conducted without foreign intervention. The fourth Senior Official Meeting was planned for 20 November. Concrete aims of the Berlin meeting included a formal communiqué of intended actions (prepared as a draft communiqué during the Senior Official Meetings), an operational annex, and the creation of a committee to work with UNSMIL in implementing the aims of the communiqué and in "[playing] a fundamental role in terms of ensuring respect for a ceasefire and better implementation of the arms embargo."

At the fifth preparation meeting on 10 December 2019, two documents were "to a very large extent ready" to be proposed for signature by the political leaders expected to participate in the Berlin conference.

==== Final preparation phase ====
In early January 2020, Italian, Turkish, Russian and German political leaders expressed support for the Berlin conference, and for Algeria's participation in the conference in its role as a neighbouring country. German chancellor Angela Merkel confirmed 19 January 2020 as the date for the Berlin conference, to include representatives of the US, Russia, UK, France, the People's Republic of China, Italy, the UAE, Turkey, the Republic of Congo, Egypt, Algeria, and of the UN, the EU, the AU and the Arab League. GNA head al-Sarraj and LNA head Haftar were invited to the Berlin conference.

==== Conference and Conclusions ====
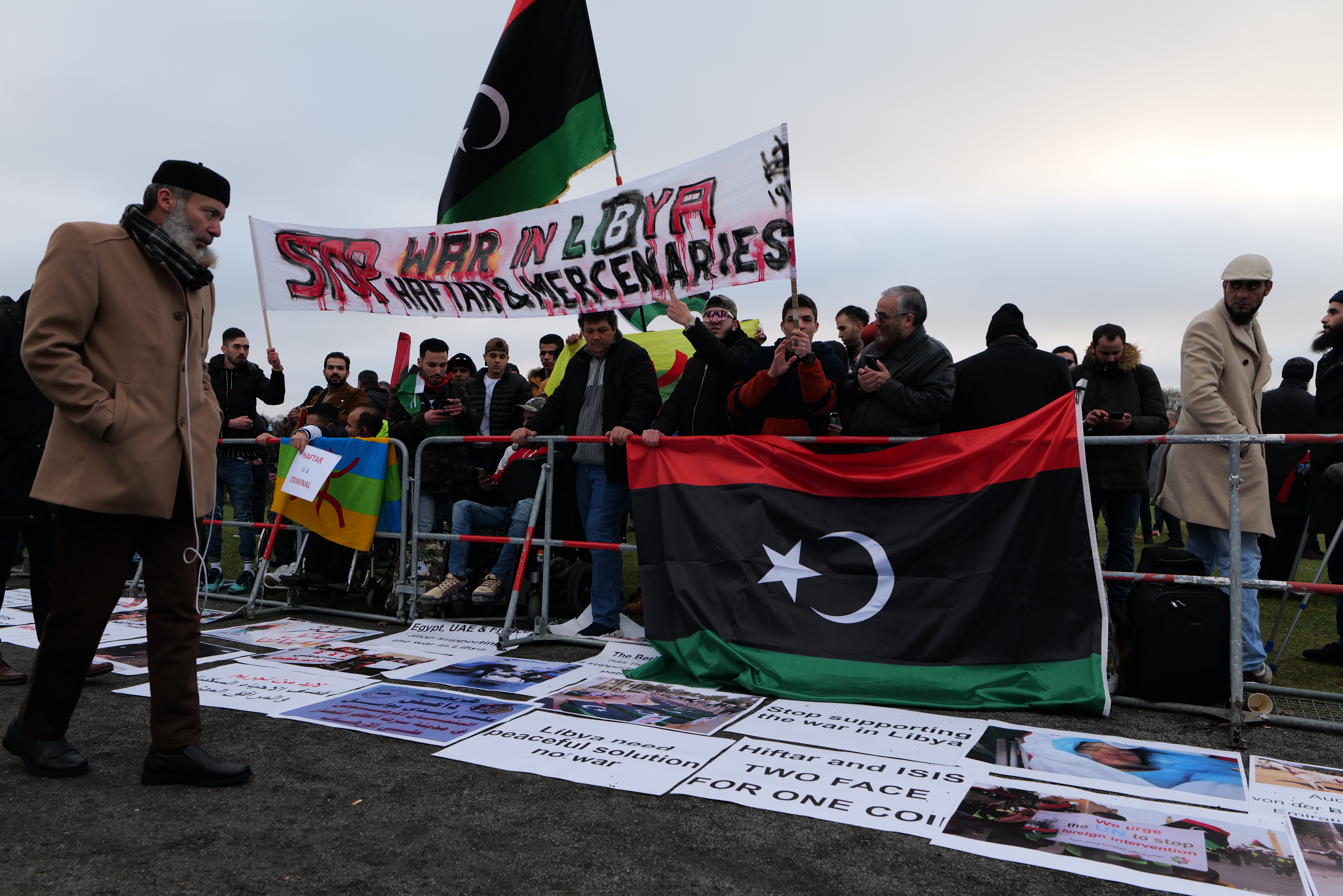
Anti-Haftar protest at the Berlin conference

The Berlin conference was held on 19 January 2020 as planned. Al-Sarraj and Haftar were both present in Berlin, but didn't participate directly in the main talks, as they refused to be in the same room as one another. They were kept informed of the discussions. An anti-Haftar protest of 150 people was held in Berlin near the conference venue with posters including "Haftar kills Libyan children".

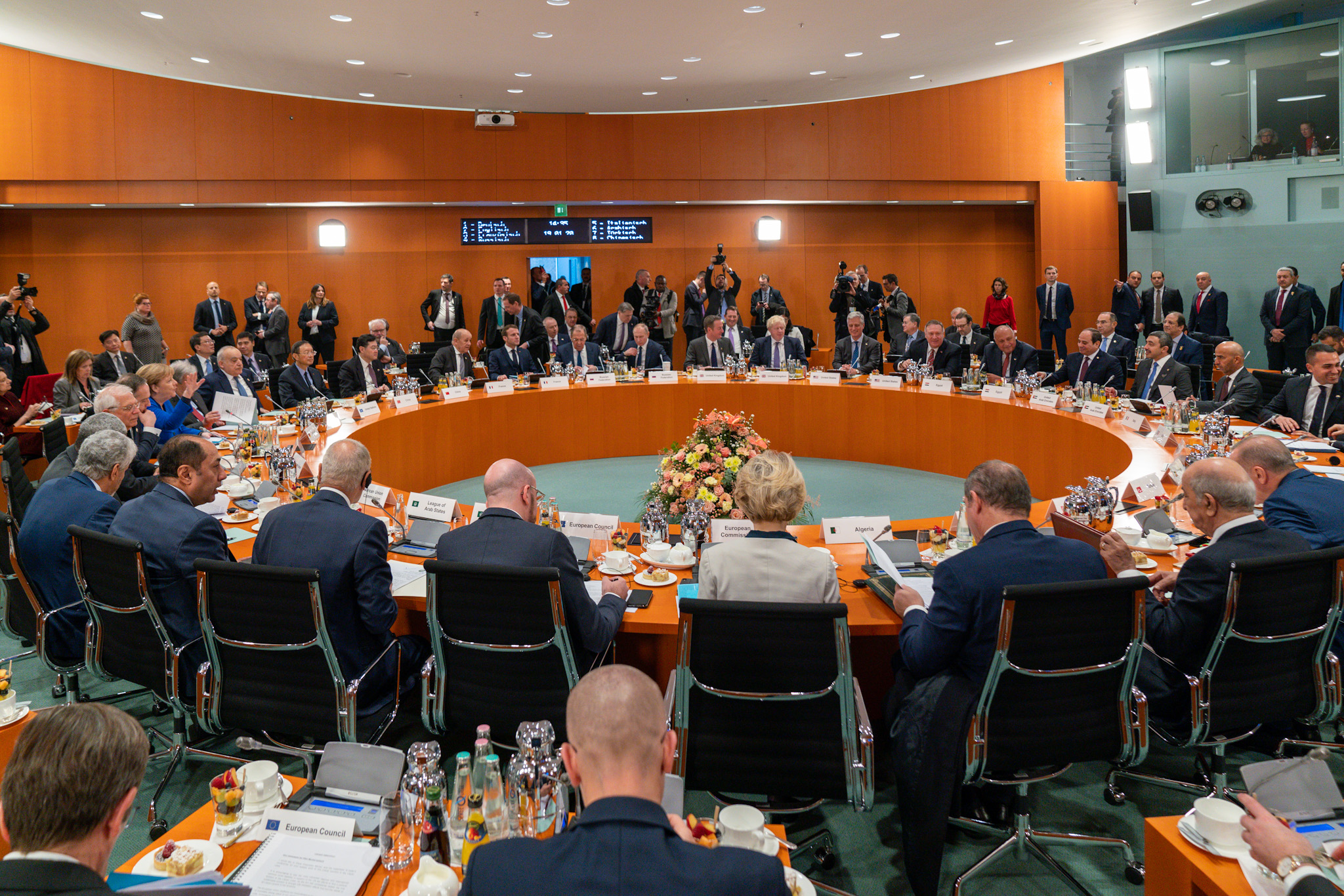
The Libya Summit in Berlin, Germany on 19 January 2020

A six-page Conclusions document with 55 points covering the peace process was issued to represent the results of the conference. Point 5 of the document described the "sole objective" of the conference, termed the Berlin Process, as "assisting the United Nations in unifying the International Community in their support for a peaceful solution to the Libyan crisis" and committing the countries and international bodies present at the conference to support the 3-point Salamé peace plan. The document includes subsections on the components of the peace process:

- the "ceasefire";
- the "arms embargo";
- an intra-Libyan "return to the political process" including the Skhirat agreement as a "viable framework";
- "security sector reform" for creating unified security, police and military forces under a single civilian authority "building upon the Cairo talks";
- "economic and financial reform";
- "respect for international humanitarian law and human rights";
- "follow-up", including the creation of a military "5+5" committee and an "International Follow-up Committee" (IFC).

Point 51 of the Conclusions stated that Sarraj on behalf of the GNA and Haftar on behalf of the LNA had already nominated their respective representatives on the military 5+5 committee.

Points 54, 55 and 56 defined the International Follow-up Committee to "[consist] of all countries and International Organisations that participated in [the] Berlin Conference on Libya in order to maintain coordination ... under the aegis of the United Nations". The IFC is required to meet monthly to track progress in the implementation of the Conclusions, and to have four technical working groups to meet twice a month to "address obstacles to implementation" and to share information and coordinate.

==== Arms embargo ====
On 25 January, UNSMIL reported violations of the arms embargo, stating that during the previous ten days, "numerous cargo and other flights [had] been observed landing at Libyan airports in the western and eastern parts of the country providing the parties with advanced weapons, armoured vehicles, advisers and fighters."

A confidential report sent to the United Nations Security Council in September 2020 stated that eight countries had violated the embargo. According to the report, the United Arab Emirates and Russia were sent five cargo aircraft filled with weapons to Libya on 19 January 2020, the day of the Berlin conference. The New York Times described this as "blatant" hypocrisy. Four of these aircraft were sent from the UAE and one from Russia. Turkish transport of military resources to Libya constituted another major violation of the arms embargo.

On 8 March 2021, the United Nations Security Council released a report in which the Panel of Experts on Libya said that the 2011 arms embargo remain “totally ineffective”. It identified “multiple acts” of “extensive, blatant” violations between October 2019 and January 2021 by the actors, including some UN member states. In a 550-page report, the body listed several illicit shipments, including transport aircraft, drones, surface-to-air missiles, armored vehicles, and others by countries like Russia, the United Arab Emirates, Egypt, Turkey, and others. Besides, the deployment of private mercenaries like the Russian Wagner group and non-state actors like the Blackwater founder Erik Prince, which were both backed by the UAE.

=== Intra-Libyan preparations ===
The third point of the Salamé three-point peace plan is intra-Libyan negotiations without external interference along economic, military and political tracks in parallel.

In support of internal Libyan conflict resolution infrastructure, UNSMIL held three mediation workshops for 97 Libyan men and 23 Libyan women, with the aim of creating a national network of mediators including "tribal leaders, elders, representatives of civil society, youth and women activists, academics and businesspeople, who enjoy credibility and respect amongst their various constituencies." On 11 January, Stephanie Williams, deputy head of UNSMIL for political affairs, discussed with Khalid al-Mishri, head of the High Council of State (HCS), inviting the HCS to a late-January meeting between the HCS and the House of Representatives (HoR) in Geneva for the purposes of "resuming dialogue".

==== Economic track ====
===== 6 January =====
On 6 January 2020, Ghassan Salamé coordinated a meeting in Tunis among nineteen Libyan economic experts intended to represent the main Libyan financial and economic institutions and sectors and a wide range of political interests and geographical regions. Salamé stated UNSMIL's aim of starting all three of the economic, military and political "Libyan-led" tracks of negotiations in January 2020. He stated that the 6 January meeting constituted the start of the economic track.

===== 9–10 February =====
The economic/financial track was scheduled to continue in Cairo on 9 February. According to The Libya Observer, groups called the Tripolitanian Society and the National Assembly for Seventeenth February Revolutionaries objected to hosting any intra-Libyan talks in Cairo because of Egypt's role in supporting the LNA. The issue of "fair distribution or redistribution of the State revenues" in relation to the Libyan oil industry and the concerns of tribal chiefs who in late January blocked several Libyan oil terminals was set as a high priority issue for the 9 February meeting.

At the 9–10 February Cairo meeting, the participants agreed on the terms of reference defining a Libyan Expert Economic Commission and its operations. The Commission aims to have three working groups for "revenue management and distribution", transparency, decentralisation, the Libyan banking crisis, and reconstruction and development. The following meeting of the economic/financial track was proposed for early March.

==== Military track ====
On 7 January 2020, Salamé expressed hope that negotiations on the military and security track would start within the following fortnight. These would cover a ceasefire, the arms embargo, disarmament, demobilization and reintegration (DDR), and "terrorism and counterterrorism".

At the 19 January Berlin conference, a military "5+5 committee" proposed by UNSMIL, with 5 members appointed each by Sarraj and Haftar, was defined in point 51 of the Conclusions of the conference. The 10 members were named at the conference and were expected to start meeting the following week. Salamé considers the 5+5 committee to be part of the military track. On 20 January, he described the main task of the committee as "[working] on sending away foreign fighters from Libya as soon as possible".

===== JMC membership =====
As of 25 February 2020, the head of GNA's five members of the 5+5 Libyan Joint Military Commission (JMC) is Ahmed Abu Shahma. Ali Hamed al-Lamaoui, a political representative of a brigade of the Toubou people from the south of Libya, stated that as of 22 February 2020, the JMC excluded "the Libyan majority from constructing solutions", with four of the five GNA representatives being from Zintan, Misrata, Tripoli and Zawiya. Al-Lamaoui was sceptical of the representativity of the GNA five and of the chances of the JMC coming to agreement.

===== 3–8 February =====
The 5+5 committee, formally named the 5+5 Libyan Joint Military Commission, started meeting in Geneva on 3 February in talks facilitated by Salamé. The committee consists of 5 senior military officers chosen by the GNA and 5 senior military officers chosen by Haftar. Topics of negotiation on 4 February included practical details of ceasefire monitoring, including the types of monitors, the roles of Libyan authorities and the UN and what "kind of action should be taken in terms of heavy weaponry". The priority was that the monitoring decisions should be taken by Libyans. An EU proposal to provide ceasefire monitors was scheduled to be considered later during the week. On 6 February, the tentative monitoring plan, accepted by both sides, was for the 5+5 committee to "be involved" in the ceasefire monitoring "under the auspices of UNSMIL"; ceasefire details remained under discussion. The two sides did not meet face-to-face.

The result of the early February meeting from the two sides was consensus on several principles, including the defence of Libyan territory, Libyan independence from international interference, opposition to "UN-identified terrorist groups (al-Qaeda, ISIS, Ansar al-Sharia)", and support for an existing UNSMIL committee's role in exchanges of prisoners and the returns of mortal remains. The two sides agreed to continue negotiating to reach a "comprehensive ceasefire agreement". UNSMIL proposed 18 February for the following round of talks.

===== 18–23 February =====
The 5+5 Libyan Joint Military Commission started its second round of negotiations in Geneva on 18 February. Salamé described the type of questions to be discussed to include, "What kind of monitoring do you need? Who is going to do it on the ground? Are they going to be unarmed? What will happen to the other weapons? What will happen to non-regular fighters? What will happen to areas that are overbuilt, I mean very urbanized in the city of Tripoli, I mean who is going to be in charge of the police ..." The GNA declared that it withdrew from the talks after the port of Tripoli was shelled by the LNA. The talks continued on 20 February and concluded on 23 February. The JMC participants agreed on a draft ceasefire declaration for civilians to return to their places of residence and defining a joint ceasefire monitoring mechanism to be managed by UNSMIL and the JMC, to be proposed to the GNA and LNA leaders. A third meeting was scheduled for March to finalise the terms of reference of sub-committees responsible for implementing the agreement.

==== Political track ====
On 7 January 2020, Salamé stated his expectation that the political dialogue track would start by late January, possibly at the Palace of Nations in Geneva. At the 19 January Berlin conference, the GNA and LNA agreed to participate in a Geneva meeting on the political track "soon".

On 20 January, Salamé stated that the late-January meeting would include thirteen representatives of the House of Representatives (HoR) and thirteen of the High Council of State (HCS); and "independent persons" including women and minority representatives. The political track negotiations would be open to "all issues", including the 2017 draft Libyan constitution, electoral laws and dates and "maybe" an agreement on holding elections in a nationally unified way. On 30 January, Salamé stated that the GNA representatives agreed to participate in dialogue, and that there were "deep divisions" in the HoR "hindering" the HoR's choice of representatives. On 4 February, Salamé stated that he expected the political track dialogue to start mid-February. On 4–5 February, the HCS and the Tripoli component of the HoR conditioned their representatives' participation in the Geneva political track meeting to "the success of the military track", to the strengthening of the ceasefire and to the return of the LNA to its positions prior 4 April 2019. On 6 February, Salamé stated that the political track was expected to be launched on 26 February in Geneva with 40 participants.

The political track membership was later clarified to be defined as 13 HoR representatives, 13 HCS representatives and 14 "independent" persons selected by UNSMIL. Independent participants included former Education Minister Othman Abdul Jalil, Interior Minister Fathi Bashagha, former head of the HCS Abdulrahman Sewehli and Abdullah Othman. Libya Herald described Othman as a "former regime figure" suspected of involvement with the Muslim Brotherhood#Libya.

The HCS and the Tripoli-based branch of the HoR stated on 24 February that they would boycott the political track negotiations until the military track made significant progress. The Tobruk-based branch of the HoR wished all of the 13 HoR representatives to be those from the Tobruk branch and objected to UNSMIL's acceptance of 5 HoR representatives selected by the Tripoli-based HoR group. The Tobruk group stated that it would boycott the political track meeting unless all of its 13 selected people were accepted as participants and described the UNSMIL's refusal to accept the full 13 as "intervention" in decision-making.

===== 26 February =====
The political track was launched on 26 February in Geneva among 20 Libyan participants from the HoR, from both the Tobruk-based and Tripoli-based parts of the HoR, and from the independent persons' group. The first day of the talks started with negotiations on the structure and agenda of the talks and with the creation of a drafting committee. UNSMIL said that absent invitees would join the talks later.

== August/September 2020 ceasefire and negotiations ==
A ceasefire and negotiations restarted in August/September 2020, during roughly the same period as the 2020 Libyan protests in both GNA and LNA controlled cities.

=== 21 August ceasefire declaration ===
A major step in the post-Salamé phase of negotiations started on 21 August 2020 with al-Sarraj for the GNA and Aguila Saleh for the LNA jointly announcing a ceasefire and calling for the lifting of the oil blockade, for a new presidential council to be established temporarily in Sirte, for parliamentary and presidential elections to be held in March 2021, and for joint deployment of security forces in Sirte to guard a new presidential council.

=== September negotiations ===
Negotiations continued during 7–9 September in Montreux among unnamed "key Libyan stakeholders", with the support of UNSMIL and the Centre for Humanitarian Dialogue. The participants agreed on an 18-month time scale for holding parliamentary and presidential elections, on implementing an amnesty to be approved by the parliament, on supporting the return of internally displaced people and the diaspora, and on moving several government functions to Sirte. UNSMIL stated that it would help to support a "[resumption of] the fully inclusive Libyan Political Dialogue Forum".

On 11 September in Bouznika, Libyan Dialogue discussions continued between five members of the GNA and five members of the HoR, including Idris Omran of the HoR. Omran stated that the group had agreed on "the criteria, transparent mechanisms and objectives" for key national roles. According to Libyan media, roles under debate included the heads of the central bank, of the National Oil Corporation and of the armed forces.

== Intra-Libyan three-track process ==
The three-track intra-Libyan peace process continued in late 2020, chaired by Stephanie Williams of UNSMIL, following the August ceasefire and September Montreux meeting, with the political track evolving into the Libyan Political Dialogue Forum, and the military track leading to a 24 October agreement on a permanent ceasefire.

=== Economic track ===
The third meeting of the economic track of negotiations, including 29 Libyan economic experts, together with representatives from the United Nations Development Programme (UNDP) and the World Bank and Stephanie Williams of UNSMIL as chair, was held virtually on 18 September 2020, using hubs in Tripoli, Benghazi and Sebha. Discussion topics included an "audit of the two branches of the Central Bank of Libya" and the setting of a precedent for further online meetings.

=== Political track ===
The political track of negotiations took the name Libyan Political Dialogue Forum (LPDF), to take place both online and face-to-face, starting in October 2020. UNSMIL, based on a "recommendation from a great majority of Libyan constituencies", set a condition that participation in the LPDF would require participants to declare themselves ineligible for positions of political or "sovereign" power in the new institutions to be created. LPDF virtual meetings were planned to start on 26 October 2020, and face-to-face meetings were planned to start in Tunisia in early November 2020. Meetings between Williams and Libyan mayors from the West, South and East of Libya started in mid-October.

In January 2021, the LPDF decided with a 73% majority on a procedure for selecting a unitary executive for the positions in the Presidency Council and for the prime ministership that would lead to national elections proposed for 24 December 2021.

=== Military track: permanent ceasefire ===
The fourth round of the 5+5 Libyan Joint Military Commission started in Geneva on 19 October 2020, chaired by Williams. On 24 October, the participants signed an agreement for an immediate permanent ceasefire throughout Libya. The agreement included:

- the withdrawal of all foreign mercenaries and other forces within 90 days
- the suspension of military training
- the creation of a Joint Operations Room for joint police and military forces
- the identification and categorisation of all militias
- disarmament, demobilization and reintegration (DDR) of the militias
- confidence-building measures including:
  - travel between the west and east parts of Libya
  - prisoner exchange
  - ending hate speech
  - reorganisation of the Petroleum Facilities Guard
- monitoring the ceasefire

== 2023: Creation of the 6+6 Committee ==
In late February 2023, the High Council of State (HCS) and the House of Representatives (HoR) agreed to create a joint committee, called the "6+6 Committee" to work on electoral law in Libya. The head of UNSMIL, Abdoulaye Bathily, expressed his encouragement for the 6+6 Committee to work efficiently to enable elections to be held in 2023. In June 2026, the heads of the HoR, the HCS and the Presidential Council agreed on holding presidential and parliamentary elections by 17 February 2027 on the basis of the 6+6 electoral rules.

== 2025: Advisory Committee and Structured Dialogue ==
=== Advisory Committee ===
In 2025, UNSMIL formed an Advisory Committee of "20 well-respected Libyan experts, representing diverse backgrounds" with the aim of resolving disagreements in electoral procedures. The committee's recommendations were published and UNSMIL carried out offline and online consultations and Hanna Tetteh, head of UNSMIL, proposed a "roadmap" based on the consultations.

=== Structured Dialogue ===
Hanna Tetteh stated that during the consultations following the Advisory Committee's report, "an overwhelming number of Libyans whom we met ... wanted to see a more inclusive political process where ordinary Libyans are involved and have their voices heard and listened to". In response, UNSMIL started a process named the "Structured Dialogue", aiming to provide recommendations for Libyan political processes by a diverse group of people via a citizens' assembly.

A nomination process of potential participants in the dialogue started with nominations from "municipalities, political parties, universities, national technical and security institutions, and cultural and other specialized entities and societal groups" and self-nominations by 1000 individuals. A group of 137 people, including 81 men, 43 women, and 13 youth, among them "representatives of cultural and linguistic components, and persons with disabilities", were selected from the list of nominees and from a list of people from UNSMIL's "existing networks" (according to Tetteh) or a list of "additional experts included to ensure balance, inclusivity, and technical expertise" (according to The Libya Observer).

On 14 December 2025, a two-day sitting of the selected participants started in Tripoli. Aiming at transparency, parts of the 14 December dialogue were to be live streamed, and online dialogues and surveys were expected to continue as part of the Structured Dialogue process.

The aims of the dialogue include both short-term aims in relation to presidential, parliamentary or municipal elections in Libya; and policy and legislative proposals for long-term political processes. The Libya Observer divided the dialogue's themes into five: governance, economy, security, national reconciliation, and human rights. UNSMIL grouped the themes into four, with "national reconciliation and human rights" as a single theme.

As a complement to the Structured Dialogue, a Women's Caucus was established, aiming to make recommendations on the same four themes as the Structured Dialogue. An online web service was set up to encourage youth participation beyond the youth present at the Tripoli dialogue session. According to Tetteh, people with disabilities were being consulted.

A full report on the discussions of the Structured Dialogue was published in Arabic on 3 June 2026.

== See also ==
- Conflict resolution
- Sudanese peace process
