= Libyan Institute for Advanced Studies =

Libyan Institute for Advanced Studies (مجمع ليبيا للدراسات المتقدمة) or (LIAS) is a private research, advisory, and education institution in Libya. It has campuses in Tripoli, Bayda, and Tobruk.

LIAS is led by Chairman Dr. Aref Ali Nayed.
