= Leila Ben Khalifa =

Libyan politician

Leila Salim Musa Ben Khalifa
- ليلى بن خليفة

Personal details
- Born: 11 October 1975 (age 50) Zuwara, Libya
- Party: National Movement Party

Leila Salim Musa Ben Khalifa or simply Leila Ben Khalifa (Arabic: ليلى بن خليفة; born 11 October 1975) is a Libyan journalist, human rights activist, and head of the National Movement Party.

== Early life and education ==
Leila Ben Khalifa was born on October 11, 1975, in the Libyan city of Zuwara. She earned a Master's degree in Business Administration in 2017, and a diploma in diplomatic and consular consulting in 2018. Under Libyan electoral law, candidates are required to have a university degree from an accredited university.

== Political activism ==
Leila Ben Khalifa is a known activist and has history of campaigning for more women to enter the political life of Libya. As General Coordinator of the We Look 30 campaign, which was launched in 2018 to support and empower women, especially, the idea of quotas for women in elections.

She founded the National Movement Party (Arabic: حزب الحركة الوطنية) inspired by the 1940s Bashir El Saadawi movement and the defunct National Congress Party.

== 2022 presidential run ==
On 22 November 2021, as head of the National Movement Party, Leila Ben Khalifa stated her intention to run for the presidency of Libya, submitting her candidacy file for the presidential elections.

Ben Khalifa is the first-ever female presidential candidate in the history of the Libya after she submitted her papers to National Elections Commission.

=== Platform ===
Her political platform has these goals:

- advocating for women in decision-making places, especially in the legislative authority
- women representation should not be less than 30% in parliament, ministries and the government

== Personal life ==
Born in the city of Zuwara, Leila Ben Khalifa has Amazigh origins. Currently she lives in Tripoli, and she is married.

== See also ==
- 2022 Libyan presidential election
