= High National Elections Commission =

Electoral commission of Libya

Agency overview
- Formed: 2011
- Jurisdiction: Libya
- Agency executives: Emad al-Shadly al-Sayah; Rabab Mohammed Halab; Abdelhakim al-Shaab Belkhair; Abubakr Ali Marda

The High National Election Commission (HNEC) is the electoral commission of Libya, established after the 2011 Libyan civil war.

== History ==
=== Formation after the 2011 civil war ===
The High National Election Commission (HNEC) was involved in organising the 2012 Libyan parliamentary election after the 2011 civil war that overthrew Muammar Gaddafi. The HNEC's chairman at the time was Nuri al-Abbar. The aim of the election was to replace the National Transitional Council created during the civil war by a representative General National Congress (GNC).

=== Libyan crisis ===
HNEC continued organising elections during the Libyan crisis. It organised the 2014 Libyan Constitutional Assembly election that elected a constituent assembly that wrote the 2017 draft Libyan constitution. HNEC organised the 2014 Libyan parliamentary election that aimed to replace the GNC by a new parliament, the House of Representatives (HoR).

Municipal elections also were held in Libya in 2014. Under Article 157 of the 2017 draft constitution, the Central Commission of Municipal Council Elections (CCMCE) was created to organise the following set of municipal elections, in coordination with HNEC, in 2018. The CCMCE organized the Libyan local elections held in 2019.

== Leadership ==
From 2016 to early 2026, the HNEC's board members were Emad al-Shadly al-Sayah, Rabab Mohammed Halab, Abdelhakim al-Shaab Belkhair and Abubakr Ali Marda.
