= Central Commission of Municipal Council Elections =

Libyan electoral commission for municipal elections

Agency overview
- Jurisdiction: Libya
- Annual budget: (UNDP-supported 2018–2020 Local Elections project: US$3,981,960)
- Agency executive: Salem Bentahia

The Central Commission of Municipal Council Elections (CCMCE) is a Libyan electoral commission for organising municipal elections to replace councils elected in 2014. The intention was to hold a full set of municipal elections in 2018.

== Aims ==
The Government of National Accord (GNA), led by prime minister Fayez al-Sarraj, decided to organise municipal elections in 2018 to replace local councils elected in 2014, under the responsibility of the CCMCE. The CCMCE is expected to coordinate with the Libyan High National Election Commission (HNEC), which according to Article 157 of the draft Libyan constitution is responsible for organising local elections.

The aim of the CCMCE is to hold municipal elections in all 92 municipal areas that held elections with confirmed results during 2014–2015, including areas under the control of the Libyan National Army (LNA). The LNA replaced 9 elected councils, out of 27, by military administrators. Altogether 120 local councils were created in 2013.

The initial plan included three phases: update voter registration lists; hold elections in 44 towns in mid-2018 for councils finishing their mandates and where there were no complicated legal issues; hold the remaining 48 elections in late 2018.

== Organisational structure and support ==
As of January 2021, Salem Bentahia (also Salem bin Tahia, Salim bin Tahia) was the head of the CCMCE, having held the role since March 2019 or earlier. As of 2 September 2020, Khaled Younis was a spokesperson for the CCMCE.

=== International support ===
The United Nations Development Programme (UNDP) and the United Nations Support Mission in Libya (UNSMIL) supported CCMCE in electoral organising, aiming to provide technical advice for voter registration, voting logistics, voter education, and contact with citizens' associations to support the holding of local elections. The UNDP stated that its support project was "designed and guided by the needs" of the CCMCE, and that the CCMCE is a member of the project board.

Coordination with the International Foundation for Electoral Systems was planned.

=== Voter identification ===
Voter identification is planned by coordinating with the Libyan Civil Registry Authority to manage citizens' identifications by their National Number, to be included in a voter registration system.

=== Voter education ===
Activities encouraging "women, youth, differently-abled persons and other vulnerable groups" to participate in the local elections were planned.

== Electoral events conducted by the CCMCE ==
Elections that were supposed to be held in 2014 in Zawiya, Bani Walid and Dirj, but were postponed for security reasons, were held successfully in 2018.

In 2019, the 2019 Libyan local elections started in March and April with elections held in 20 municipalities. The series of local elections continued with elections in Ghat in mid-August 2020 and a September announcement of plans to hold elections in 15 towns in the Libyan National Army (LNA) controlled eastern part of Libya.

== See also ==
- High National Elections Commission (English)
- 2024–2026 Libyan local elections
