= National Movement Party (Libya) =

Political party in Libya

National Movement Party حزب الحركة الوطنية
- Leader: Leila Ben Khalifa
- Founder: Leila Ben Khalifa
- Headquarters: Tripoli
- Ideology: Libyan nationalism Minority rights

The National Movement Party (Arabic: حزب الحركة الوطنية) is a political party in Libya founded by Libyan journalist and human rights activist Leila Ben Khalifa inspired by the 1940s Bashir El Saadawi movement and the defunct National Congress Party.

In 2021, the National Movement Party nominated Leila Ben Khalifa as their presidential candidate in the first Libyan presidential election since the independence of this country.
