= Ihya Libya =

Political party in Libya

Ihya Libya إحياء ليبيا
- Leader: Aref Ali Nayed
- Founded: 24 August 2017
- Ideology: Liberalism; Liberal democracy; Constitutionalism; Decentralisation; Civic nationalism
- Political position: Centre to centre-right
- House of Representatives: 0 / 200

Website
- www.ihyalibya.com

Ihya Libya (English: Reviving Libya) is a political party in Libya which was founded on 24 August 2017 by Aref Ali Nayed. Its stated aim is to create a "stable, democratic and prosperous country". After being launched, the movement became dormant, before being re-launched on 20 August 2018, when Aref Nayed announced his candidacy for the Next Libyan general election.

The movement has been centered around "four pillars", which are key reforms and developments it believes are necessary to create a stable Libya by 2023. These include:

- peace, security and the rule of law
- economic development
- human development
- governance and public sector reform
