= 2014 Libyan local elections =

Local elections were held in Libya in 2014.

== Background ==
The Libyan Central Commission of Municipal Council Elections, headed by Salem Bentahia as of March 2019, is responsible for elections for the 120 local councils that were created in 2013.

== Election ==
The 2014 municipal elections were held at a cost of 65,000,000 Libyan dinars and were generally perceived as democratic. The councils resulting from the 2014 elections were seen by Libyans, as of 2018, as "the most trustworthy and legitimate elected bodies" in Libya.

=== 2016 removal of elected mayors ===
In late 2016, Major-General Abdul Razzaq Al-Nazhuri of the Libyan National Army (LNA) replaced several of the elected municipal mayors in eastern Libya with unelected people, mostly military. Altogether the LNA replaced nine elected councils, out of 27 in its area of control, with military administrators.

=== 2018 delayed elections ===
In Zawiya, Bani Walid and Dirj, the local elections that were supposed to have been held in 2014 were held in 2018. The Bani Walid elections in 2014 had failed for "security reasons".
