= Libya–United Arab Emirates relations =

- Libya: United Arab Emirates

Libya–United Arab Emirates relations are the bilateral relations between Libya and United Arab Emirates. The two countries are members of the Arab League and the United Nations.

== History ==
With the outbreak of the revolution in Libya in 2011, the United Arab Emirates supported the Libyan rebels, and even provided them with weapons and logistical support. When the second civil war broke out in Libya in 2014, the United Arab Emirates supported the forces of General Khalifa Haftar, and provided him with military, political, financial and media assistance. In January 2020, Libya's Supreme Council proposed to the UN- recognized Government of National Accord (GNA) to sever ties with the United Arab Emirates.

== Resident diplomatic missions ==
- Libya has an embassy in Abu Dhabi and a consulate general in Dubai.
- United Arab Emirates has an embassy in Tripoli.
