= United Nations Security Council Resolution 2009 =

UN Security Council Resolution 2009
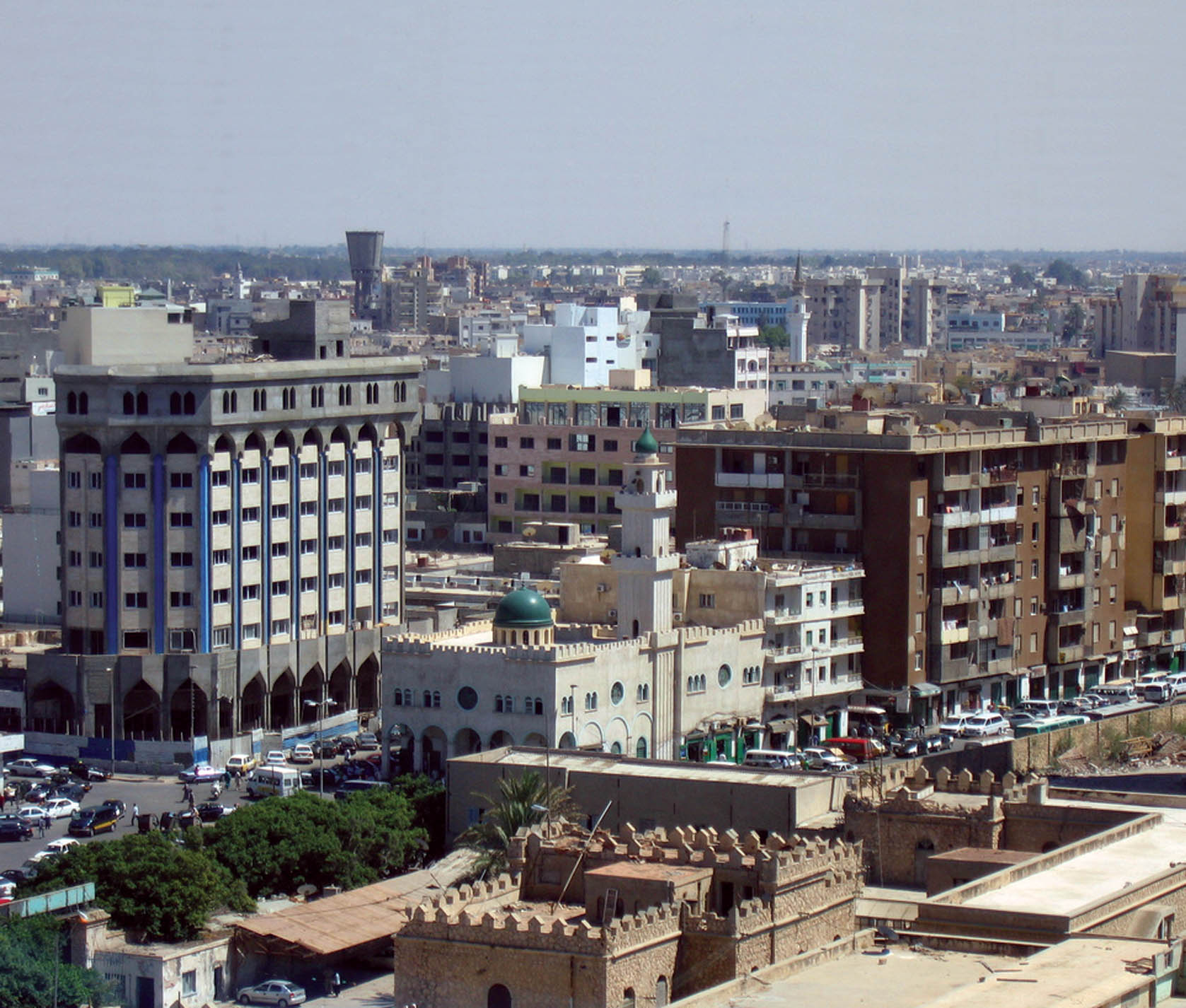
- Tripoli
- Date: 16 September 2011
- Meeting no.: 6,620
- Code: S/RES/2009 (Document)
- Subject: Libyan Civil War
- Voting summary: 15 voted for; None voted against; None abstained
- Result: Adopted

Security Council composition
- Permanent members: China; France; Russia; United Kingdom; United States
- Non-permanent members: Bosnia–Herzegovina; Brazil; Colombia; Germany; Gabon; India; Lebanon; Nigeria; Portugal; South Africa

United Nations Security Council Resolution 2009 was unanimously adopted on 16 September 2011.

== Resolution ==
The United Nations Security Council adopted a position of leadership in an international effort to support Libya in the process of building a democratic, independent, and united nation. The Security Council unanimously decided to establish a support mission in Libya.

The Council also decided that the mandate of the United Nations Support Mission in Libya (UNSMIL) would be authorized for an initial period of three months. It should assist Libyan national efforts to restore public security, promote the rule of law, foster inclusive political dialogue and national reconciliation, and embark on constitution-making and electoral processes.

The mandate would cover assisting national efforts to extend State authority, strengthen institutions, restore public services, support transitional justice and protect human rights, particularly those of vulnerable groups. It would also include taking the immediate steps required to initiate economic recovery and coordinate support that may be requested from other multilateral and bilateral actors, as appropriate.

In support of those objectives, the Council also partly lifted, through the resolution, the arms embargo imposed on Libya and the asset freeze targeting entities connected to the previous regime, under resolution 1970 (2011). It emphasized its intention to keep the no-fly zone imposed by resolution 1973 (2011) under review.

Following the adoption, Council members congratulated Libya's representative on taking his seat as a representative of the National Transitional Council. Most speakers stressed the importance of Libyan ownership of all transitional and reconstruction efforts.

South Africa's representative, however, expressed disappointment that the resolution did not call specifically for the protection of the human rights of African migrants. Alongside the Russian Federation's representative and other speakers, he also called for the early lifting of the no-fly zone.

UNSCR 2009 (2011) said:

- Decides to establish a United Nations Support Mission in Libya (UNSMIL), under the leadership of a Special Representative of the Secretary-General for an initial period of three months, and decides further that the mandate of UNSMIL shall be to assist and support Libyan national efforts to :
- (a) restore public security and order and promote the rule of law;
- (b) undertake inclusive political dialogue, promote national reconciliation, and embark upon the constitution-making and electoral process;
- (c) extend state authority, including through strengthening emerging accountable institutions and the restoration of public services;
- (d) promote and protect human rights, particularly for those belonging to vulnerable groups, and support transitional justice;
- (e) take the immediate steps required to initiate economic recovery; and
- (f) coordinate support that may be requested from other multilateral and bilateral actors as appropriate;

== See also ==
- List of United Nations Security Council Resolutions 2001 to 2100
- United Nations Security Council Resolution 1973
