= 2024–2026 Libyan local elections =

Local elections were held in Libya during 2024–2026, organised by the High National Elections Commission in three phases.

== First phase ==
The first phase of the elections was held on 16 November 2024.

== Second phase ==
On 4 August 2025, the second phase of voting, expected to be for 51 municipalities, was planned for 16 August. Sixty of the candidates for individual seats and four electoral lists were excluded (as of 4 August) from the second phase due to not satisfying an endorsement requirement. On 16 August, the number of scheduled municipalities was 63, but elections were held in only 26, due to physical attacks against election offices. On 17 August, the preliminary estimate of the turnout was 71%.

On 18 October, voting in 16 more municipalities took place, with another round scheduled for 20 October.

== Third phase ==
The third phase of voting began in early November 2025. Nine municipalites resumed their elections on 13 December 2025, with 213 individual candidates and 65 electoral lists competing for 87 seats. HNEC stated that the turnout was 69%, with 82,293 votes cast. Preliminary results were expected to be announced in mid-December 2025.

Elections in four more municipalities were scheduled for 7 February 2026. On 8 February, HNEC announced that turnout was 72% in Tajoura, Sayyad, and Al-Hashan.

== Women's suffrage ==
Women won 205 of the seats and two of the mayorships (in Zliten and Suluq) in the 2024–2026 elections.

== See also ==
- Central Commission of Municipal Council Elections
