= 2019–2021 Libyan local elections =

Local elections were held in 20 municipalities in Libya in March and April 2019. The Libyan Central Commission of Municipal Council Elections aimed for a total of elections in 68 municipalities in 2019. With difficulties in organising elections related to the 2019–20 Western Libya campaign, the elections were not completed in 2019; they continued in 2020, with elections to at least 30 additional councils planned for 2021.

== Background ==
Of the 120 local councils that were created in 2013, the Libyan Central Commission of Municipal Council Elections (CCMCE), headed by Salem Bentahia as of March 2019, is responsible for elections in the 92 municipalities which successfully held elections with legally confirmed results during 2014–2015, and in Zawiya, Bani Walid and Dirj, in which the CCMCE held elections in 2018.

== 2019 ==
=== March 2019 ===
Local elections were held in nine municipalities in southern and western Libya, including Zuwarah, on Saturday 30 March 2019, with an overall participation rate of 38 percent.

=== April 2019 ===
Elections were held in 11 municipalities in April. On Saturday 20 April, local elections were held in Brak al-Shati, Edri al-Shati, al-Rahibat, Ubari, al-Garda al-Shati, al-Shwairif, and Zaltan. Ghassan Salamé, head of United Nations Support Mission in Libya, complimented Libyans for holding these elections despite the 2019 Western Libya offensive. On Saturday 27 April, municipal elections were held in Sabha. Elections that had been planned for Sabratha and Surman on the same day were postponed by the Libyan National Army. Other towns in which municipal elections were held around these dates included Wadi Otbh, al-Ghuraifa, and Riqdalin.

==== Sabha appeals ====
Four appeals against the results of the Sabha election resulted in the election being declared invalid in a judicial ruling. In early November 2019, Judge Ibrahim Mahfouz in the Court of First Instance of Sabha overturned three of the appeals. A single judicial circuit can only consider three appeals on a case in the Libyan judicial system, whose top body is the Supreme Judicial Council of Libya, which remained unified during the Second Libyan Civil War.

=== May 2019 ===
Voter registration by SMS was reopened by the CCMCE on 14 May for Misrata, Sabratha, al-Khums, Msallata, Jufra, Tarhuna, southern Zawiya, Kufra, Ghat, and eight municipalities in the Nafusa Mountains, including Asbi'a, Al-Haraba, Kikla, Kabaw.

== 2020 ==
=== August 2020 ===
In mid-August 2020, municipal elections were held in Ghat, the first Libyan local elections for 2020.

Municipal elections were planned to be held on 25 August 2020 in Traghan. A militia affiliated with the Libyan National Army (LNA) prevented the election from taking place.

The elected Sabha council was restored to power in August 2020 following a court decision. The Government of National Accord (GNA) had earlier replaced the elected Sabha council by a temporary council.

=== September 2020 ===
On 2 September 2020, plans for the CCMCE to hold municipal elections with local community support in 15 municipalities in the LNA-controlled (eastern) part of Libya, including Derna and Al Qubbah, were announced in Benghazi by CCMCE spokesperson Khaled Younis.

Elections were held in Misrata on 3 September with CCMCE support.

On 23 September, residents of Gharyan protested, calling for a municipal election to be held.

=== October 2020 ===
Elections for the municipal councils of Al-Haraba, Jadu, Kabaw and Zawiya in western Libya were planned for 15 October.

=== December 2020 ===
Municipal elections in ar-Rajban and Zawiya were held on 21 December 2020.

== 2021 ==
=== January 2021 ===
The first four council elections of 2021 occurred on 7 January in the cities of Gasr Akhyar and Zliten, as well as for the Tripoli municipalities of Hay al-Andalus and Swani Bin Adam.

On 11 January the first municipal elections of the electoral cycle took place in eastern Libya, to the councils of Awjila, Jalu, and Jikharra.

Voting continued on 23 January in the Tripoli suburb of Garabulli and a re-run in two precincts of Swani Bin Adam.

== See also ==
- Libyan peace process
- 2020 Libyan protests
- 2024–2026 Libyan local elections
