= Ghassan Salamé =

Lebanese academic (born 1951)

- غسان سلامة
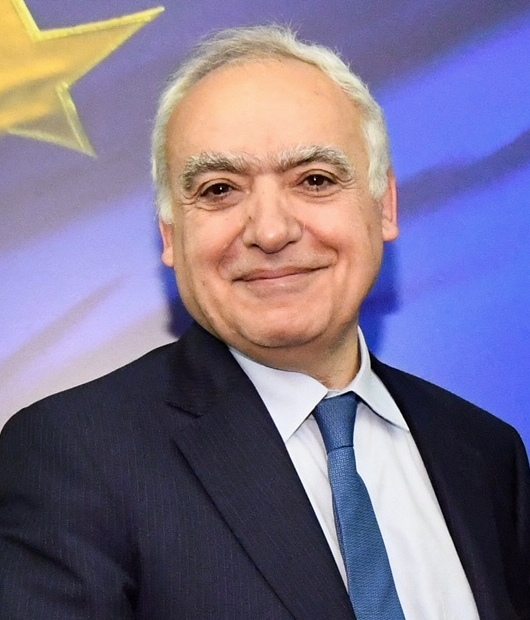
- Salamé in 2018

Minister of Culture
- Incumbent
- Assumed office 8 February 2025
- President: Joseph Aoun
- Prime Minister: Nawaf Salam
- Preceded by: Mohammad Mortada

Personal details
- Born: 1951 (age 74–75) Beirut, Lebanon
- Party: Independent
- Spouse: Mary Boghossian
- Children: 2 daughters (including Léa)
- Relatives: Raphaël Glucksmann (son-in-law)
- Education: Saint Joseph University; University of Paris
- Occupation: Academic, diplomat
- Cabinet: Nawaf Salam cabinet

Ghassan Salamé (Arabic: غسان سلامة; born 1951) is a Lebanese academic who currently serves as the Minister of Culture since February 2025. He previously served in the same position from 2000 to 2003. He was the Dean of the Paris School of International Affairs (PSIA) and professor of International Relations at Sciences Po. Salamé served as the head of the United Nations Support Mission in Libya from 2017 to 2020.

== Early life and education ==
Ghassan Salamé was born in 1951 in Beirut, Lebanon, originally from Kfardebian. He studied at Saint Joseph University and later studied public international law (Diploma of Advanced Studies, DEA, University of Paris), as well as in literature (PhD in humanities, Paris III Sorbonne-Nouvelle University) and political science (PhD, Paris I Panthéon-Sorbonne University).

Salamé is a Melkite Greek Catholic.

== Career ==
Ghassan Salamé taught international relations at the American University of Beirut and Saint Joseph University in Beirut and, later, at the University of Paris.

In 2000–2003, Salamé was Lebanon's Minister of Culture, as well as chairman and Spokesman of the Organization Committee for the Arab Summit (March 2002) and of the Francophone Summit (October 2002) in Beirut.

Salamé presently sits on the board of the International Crisis Group (Brussels), the International Peace Institute (New York), the Open Society Foundations, the Bibliotheca Alexandrina (Egypt), and several other non-profit organizations. He was also the senior advisor to the United Nations Secretary-General from 2003 to 2006 and again in 2012. He was the political advisor to the United Nations Assistance Mission for Iraq (UNAMI) in 2003, where he played a critical role in bringing together Iraqi factions. He is the chairman of the Arab Fund for Arts and Culture. Salamé also sat on the Board of the Centre for Humanitarian Dialogue from 2011 to 2015. In 2016, he joined the Commission on the Rakhine State (Myanmar), which was chaired by former UN Secretary General Kofi Annan.

Salame is a Member of the Global Leadership Foundation (chaired by FW de Klerk) that works to support democratic leadership, prevent and resolve conflict through mediation and promote good governance in the form of democratic institutions, open markets, human rights and the rule of law.

On 22 June 2017, Salamé was appointed Head of the United Nations Support Mission in Libya (UNSMIL), replacing Martin Kobler.

On 5 August 2017, he made his first official visit to Libya after assuming the role of the head of United Nations Support Mission in Libya by arriving at Mitiga Airport in Tripoli. During 2018–2019, he mediated between political and social groups in Libya, with the aim of holding a meeting in Ghadames called the Libyan National Conference, for organising elections and to revive the Libyan peace process. In February 2020, he eventually brought delegations from the two main sides in Libya's conflict to Geneva for peace talks, but key representatives suspended their involvement. Shortly after, shelling in Tripoli had again intensified into some of the heaviest bombardments since Salame brokered a ceasefire earlier that year.

On 2 March 2020, Salamé resigned as the head of the United Nations Support Mission in Libya citing stress and health concerns. In a statement on Twitter, he said he had been frustrated with foreign powers, particularly France and Russia for covertly backing Khalifa Haftar's forces in the civil war. In January 2025, Al Jadeed TV reported he is to serve as the Minister of Culture in the new Lebanese government.

== Bibliography ==
Ghassan Salamé is the author of (inter alia) Quand l’Amérique refait le monde; Appels d'empire: ingérences et résistances à l'âge de la mondialisation; State and Society in the Arab Levant, and editor (inter alia) of Democracy Without Democrats: Politics of Liberalization in the Arab and Muslim World; The Politics of Arab Integration and The Foundations of the Arab State. His essays have been published in Foreign Policy, Revue française de science politique, European Journal of International Affairs, The Middle East Journal and other scholarly journals.

Selected Public Speeches and Articles

- Les raisons des révoltes arabes. Le Monde, 8 février 2011.
- Ghassan Salamé, poisson pilote des élites émergentes : l’ancien conseiller spécial de Kofi Annan, alors secrétaire général de l’ONU, dirige aujourd’hui la nouvelle Paris School of International Affairs de Sciences-Po. La Croix, October 21, 2010.
- Discours à l’ambassade du Qatar à Paris. Cérémonie honorant Hubert Védrine et Ghassan Salamé, September 22, 2010.
- Middle Easts, old and new, presented at the Oil and Money Conference, London, October 21, 2009.
- A Clash of Norms, speech at the UN General Assembly on the 60th Anniversary of the Universal Declaration of Human Rights, New York, December 10, 2008.

== Other activities ==
- International Crisis Group (ICG), Member of the Board of Trustees (2004–2016, since 2020)
- European Council on Foreign Relations (ECFR), Member
- Paris School of International Affairs (PSIA), Member of the Strategic Committee
- Reporters Without Borders (RWB), Member of the emeritus Board

== Honours and awards ==
- 2004 : Arab cultural personality (Dubai)
- 2003 : Knight of the Legion of Honour (France)
- 2003 : Grand prix de la francophonie (France)
- 1996 : Phoenix Prize (Lebanon)
- 1996 : Special Prize from the Association of French Language Writers (Lebanon)
