= Martin Kobler =

German diplomat (born 1953)

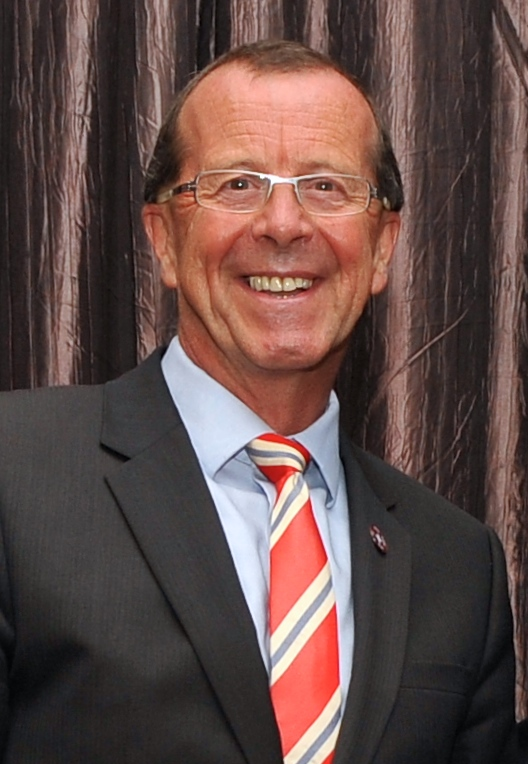
Kobler at a meeting with US Secretary of State John Kerry

Martin Kobler (born 1953 in Stuttgart) is a German former career diplomat who served as German Ambassador to Egypt, Iraq, and Pakistan. He served as Special Representative of the United Nations Secretary-General and Head of United Nations Support Mission in Libya from 4 November 2015 to 22 June 2017. Previously, he had served as Special Representative and Head of the UN Stabilization Mission in the Democratic Republic of Congo (MONUSCO) from June 2013 to 2015. In this capacity, he headed more than 20,000 peacekeepers in the country.

== Career ==
Kobler served as United Nations Secretary-General Ban Ki-moon's Special Representative for Iraq and Head of the United Nations Assistance Mission for Iraq (UNAMI) from October 2011 to July 2013. Prior to this appointment, Kobler was Deputy Special Representative (Political) for Afghanistan from 2010 to 2011.

The outcome of a major issue during his UNAMI activity, that is the protection of more than 3000 residents of Camp Ashraf, home of Iranian dissidents members of the People's Mujahedin of Iran (PMOI), a small city full of activity, against the deadly military attacks and attempts at displacement by the Iraqi government under Nouri al-Maliki, has been strongly criticised by international parliamentary groups. In fact, Struan Stevenson, who had been a high-level diplomatic player of the European Parliament involved therein, accused him of cowardice in front of the Iraqi government and of being responsible for the forced displacement of the residents to the even less safe, prison-like Camp Liberty. Moreover, Kobler's role has been described and criticized by Tahar Boumedra, former Chief of the Human Rights Office of UNAMI from 2009 to 2012, as following a subordinate appeasement policy in front of Nouri al-Maliki, while seriously offending the basic human rights via helping forcible eviction of protected people. This led to most senior UNAMI staff, including Kobler himself, quitting in protest.

A veteran of the German Foreign Service, Kobler has held several high-ranking positions, including as Director-General for Culture and Communication in Germany's Foreign Office, and as Ambassador of Germany to Iraq, Egypt and Pakistan. His other posts include Chief of Cabinet to former German Foreign Minister Joschka Fischer from 2000 to 2003, Deputy Chief of Cabinet from 1998 to 2000, and Deputy Head of the Foreign Ministry's Balkan Task Force from 1997 to 1998. Prior to this, he was instrumental in implementing the German representation with the Palestinian Authority in Jericho. Additionally, he has acted as an Electoral Observer with the United Nations missions in Haiti, Nicaragua and Cambodia.

Kobler has an advanced law degree and is fluent in English, French, German and Indonesian.

== Other activities ==
- Peace Research Institute Frankfurt (HSFK), Member of the Board of Trustees

== Personal life ==
Kobler is married to fellow diplomat Brita Wagener and has three children.

Positions in intergovernmental organisations
Preceded by Ad Melkert	UN Special Representative to Iraq; 2011–2013	Succeeded by Nickolay Mladenov
