= Palermo Conference =

Two-day conference in Palermo, Sicily

The Palermo Conference was a two-day long conference which took place in Palermo, Sicily on 12–13 November 2018 to discuss United Nations policy concerning Libya. Organized by Italian Prime Minister Giuseppe Conte, it was attended by delegations from 38 countries, including Russia, the United States, Egypt, Tunisia, Turkey, as well as representatives of many rival Libyan factions fighting for power in the country.

Attendants included Libyan prime minister Fayez al-Sarraj, Libyan field marshal Khalifa Haftar, Egyptian president Abdel Fattah el-Sisi, Tunisian president Beji Caid Essebsi, Qatari Minister of Foreign Affairs Mohammed bin Abdulrahman bin Jassim Al Thani, Libyan parliamentary speaker Aguila Saleh, and Khalid al-Mishri speaker of the upper chamber in the Libyan capital, Tripoli.

Turkey's delegation, headed by Turkish Vice President Fuat Oktay, withdrew from the conference on 13 November as a result of the exclusion of Turkish officials, on Haftar's insistence, from a private meeting between the conflict's key players.

While the conference led to no significant breakthroughs, it marked the first occasion on which Italy legitimized Haftar as a party in Libyan peace negotiations since the 2016 conclusion of the agreements that led to the establishment of the Government of National Accord. Haftar, who had made a surprise visit to Moscow earlier that month, was initially reluctant to attend the Palermo talks. He was likely convinced by Egypt and Russia to take part in the event.

Italian lawmaker Marco Zanni praised the conference. He was quoted as saying "The conference for Libya in Palermo has been a fundamental step in order to stabilize Libya and for the security of the entire Mediterranean". adding that the event constituted Italy's attempt to take a leading role in the Libyan peace process.

== List of participating countries ==
The countries that participated in the conference are listed below.

- Algeria
- Austria
- Canada
- Chad
- Czech Republic
- Egypt
- Ethiopia
- France
- Germany
- Greece
- Italy
- Jordan
- Malta
- Morocco
- Netherlands
- Niger
- Poland
- Qatar
- Republic of the Congo
- Russia
- Saudi Arabia
- Spain
- Sudan
- Sweden
- Switzerland
- Tunisia
- Turkey
- United Arab Emirates
- United Kingdom
- United States

=== Supranational organizations ===
- European Union
- Arab League
- United Nations
- African Union
- World Bank
- International Monetary Fund
