= United Nations Support Mission in Libya =

Political mission since 2011

- Abbreviation: UNSMIL
- Formation: 16 September 2011; 15 years ago
- Type: Special political mission
- Legal status: Active
- Headquarters: Tunis, Tunisia
- Head: Special Representative of the Secretary-General and Head of Mission; Vacant
- Parent organization: United Nations Security Council
- Website: unsmil.unmissions.org

The United Nations Support Mission in Libya (UNSMIL) is a United Nations (UN) advanced mission in Libya, created in the aftermath of the Libyan Civil War. UNSMIL is a political mission, not a military mission. The main elements of its mandate defined by the UN include supporting Libyan transitional authorities in "post-conflict efforts", providing mediation in implementing Libyan political agreements, supporting key Libyan institutions and monitoring and reporting on human rights. UNSMIL is led by the UN Department of Political Affairs.

== Aims and UN hierarchy ==
UNSMIL's initial mandate, defined by the UN in 2011, mainly focused on supporting Libyan transitional authorities, including the National Transitional Council of Libya, in "post-conflict efforts" to establish institutions supporting the rule of law.

Under United Nations Security Council Resolution 2009 (UNSCR 2009, in 2011), UNSMIL's mandate was more formally defined in that the United Nations:

Decides to establish a United Nations Support Mission in Libya (UNSMIL), under the leadership of a Special Representative of the Secretary-General for an initial period of three months, and decides further that the mandate of UNSMIL shall be to assist and support Libyan national efforts to:

1. (a) restore public security and order and promote the rule of law;
2. (b) undertake inclusive political dialogue, promote national reconciliation, and embark upon the constitution-making and electoral process;
3. (c) extend state authority, including through strengthening emerging accountable institutions and the restoration of public services;
4. (d) promote and protect human rights, particularly for those belonging to vulnerable groups, and support transitional justice;
5. (e) take the immediate steps required to initiate economic recovery; and
6. (f) coordinate support that may be requested from other multilateral and bilateral actors as appropriate.

— United Nations Security Council,

In 2016, the mandate was extended to include the provision of mediation in implementing the 2015 Skhirat agreement between the various Libyan transitional institutions that disputed political power. Other elements of UNSMIL's mandate include supporting key Libyan institutions and monitoring and reporting on human rights.

UNSMIL is led by the UN Department of Political Affairs.

UNSMIL's mandate was extended annually and as of 2019 continued to 15 September 2020.

== Headquarters ==
The mission is based in Tunis (Tunisia).

== Leadership ==
Ian Martin: On 11 September 2011, Ian Martin was appointed special representative of the secretary-general and head of the UNSMIL. Martin was a British national. Martin is a graduate of Emmanuel College, Cambridge in history and economics. Prior to his appointment, Martin was secretary general of Amnesty International (1986–92) and vice president of the International Center for Transitional Justice (2002–05). Martin remained in his functions at UNSMIL for one year. From 2015 to 2018, Martin was executive director of the Security Council Report in New York. In 2020, Martin was senior visiting research fellow at the Conflict, Security & Development Research Group at King's College London.

Tarek Mitri: On 12 September 2012, Tarek Mitri was appointed as special representative. Mitri was a Lebanese national. In 2005, Mitri was Lebanese minister for environment and administrative development. In 2005, he was minister of culture and foreign minister. In 2008, Mitri was appointed information minister. Mitri remained in his functions at UNSMIL for two years. After departing UNSMIL, Mitri was appointed director of the Issam Fares Institute for Public Policy and International Affairs at the American University of Beirut on 16 October 2014. In October 2015, Mitri published a book on his time as Special Representative to Libya entitled "Rugged Paths".

Bernardino León: On 14 August 2014, Bernardino León was appointed as special representative to Libya and officially assumed his functions on 1 September 2014. León was a Spanish national. León was a member of the Spanish Socialist Workers' Party. From 2004 to 2008, León was Spanish secretary of state for foreign affairs. From 2008 to 2011, León was secretary general at the office of the prime minister of Spain. León remained in his functions at UNSMIL for 14 months. Following his departure, León was appointed first director general of the Emirates Diplomatic Academy. The circumstances of León's departure were controversial. Leaked emails showed that León had secret and cordial negotiations with the United Arab Emirates government whilst leading sensitive political negotiations with Libyan authorities in his role as a special representative.

Martin Kobler: On 4 November 2015, Martin Kobler was appointed as special representative to Libya. Kobler was a German national. Kobler has an advanced law degree and is fluent in English, French, German and Indonesian. From 2010 to 2011, Kobler was deputy special representative (political) for Afghanistan. From October 2011 to July 2013, Kobler served as United Nations Secretary-General Ban Ki-moon’s special representative for Iraq and head of the United Nations Assistance Mission for Iraq (UNAMI). Kobler was subject to significant criticism for his time as special representative in Iraq. His accusers allege that Kobler sought to appease the Iraqi prime minister in a manner that contributed to significant human rights violations, and caused for many senior UNAMI staff to quit in protest. Kobler remained in his functions at UNSMIL for 20 months.

Ghassan Salamé: On 22 June 2017, Ghassan Salamé was appointed as special representative to Libya. Salamé was a Lebanese national. Salamé studied public law (Saint Joseph University, University of Paris); literature (PhD in humanities, Paris III Sorbonne-Nouvelle University); and political science (PhD, Paris I Panthéon-Sorbonne University). In 2000–2003, Salamé was Lebanon’s minister of culture. In 2003, Salamé was the political advisor to the United Nations Assistance Mission for Iraq (UNAMI). From 2003 to 2006 and again in 2012, Salamé was the senior advisor to the United Nations Secretary-General. On 3 March 2020, Salamé announced that he had resigned from his position, citing health reasons and stress as the main factors. He stated that his mediation efforts had not received the support required from countries involved in arming the Libyan sides of the conflict.

Stephanie Williams: In 2020, following Salamé's resignation, Stephanie Williams, a United States diplomat and deputy head of UNSMIL, took on the role of acting special representative to Libya and acting head of UNSMIL. Williams studied economics and government relations at the University of Maryland, and Arab studies at Georgetown University. Williams was the US deputy chief of mission in Bahrain from 2010 to 2013, deputy chief of mission in Jordan from 2013 to 2015 and Iraq from 2016 to 2017. Williams' mediation of the peace process included transforming the political track of negotiations into the Libyan Political Dialogue Forum (LPDF), scheduled to hold its first face-to-face meeting in Tunisia in early November 2020. On 15 December 2020, the United Nations Security Council approved Nickolay Mladenov as the new Special Representative to Libya, but Mladenov said that he was unable to take up the role due to "personal and family reasons."

Ján Kubiš: On 18 January 2021, Slovak diplomat Ján Kubiš was appointed by António Guterres as the new head of UNSMIL. Kubiš was 69 years old when he assumed the leadership of UNSMIL. Kubiš is a graduate from Moscow State Institute of International Relations who has held several national and international diplomatic posts. He was head of the United Nations Assistance Mission for Iraq from 2015 to 2018. During 2019 and 2020, he was the UN special representative for Lebanon. Kubis announced that he was resigning from the position 10 months after he assumed his duties. One source indicated that Kubis resigned because he was reluctant to move from Geneva to Tripoli. Following Kubis' sudden resignation, Stephanie Williams assumed the functions of acting special adviser to the secretary general until August 2022.

Abdoulaye Bathily: On 2 September 2022, Senegalese politician Abdoulaye Bathily was appointed by António Guterres as the new head of UNSMIL. He resigned from his position on 16 April 2024. Mr. Bathily held various ministerial positions in the Senegalese Government, notably as senior minister in the Office of the president in charge of African Affairs (2012–2013), minister for energy and hydraulics (2000–2001) and minister for the environment and the protection of nature (1993–1998). Elected to the National Assembly in 1998, he served as vice-speaker from 2001 to 2006. He was also elected as a member of the Economic Community of West African States Parliament (2002–2006).

Stephanie Koury: New head of UNSMIL (2024-2025). She comes from United States of America.

Hanna Tetteh: On 31 October 2025, the diplomatic and Ghanaian politician Hanna Tetteh was appointed as the new head of UNSMIL.

== Actions ==
UNSMIL recorded 48 deaths and 22 injuries in clashes between Libya's political factions in the month of September 2018.

In July 2019, the head of UNSMIL, Ghassan Salamé, proposed a 3-point plan (ceasefire, international meeting to implement the existing arms embargo, and intra-Libyan dialogue) as a new phase in the Libyan peace process, with the aim of resolving the Second Libyan Civil War.

In October 2020, Stephanie Williams undertook wide consultations with Libyan society, including meetings with Libyan mayors from the West, South and East of Libya, as part of the preparations for the Libyan Political Dialogue Forum (LPDF).

In 2022, UNSMIL mediated negotiations that took place in Cairo and eventually in Geneva between the High Counci of State and the House of Representatives that had as their purpose to establish a constitutional basis for elections. The negotiations ultimately ended without the two sides reaching agreement.

The United Kingdom reaffirmed in November 2025 its full support for the United Nations Support Mission in Libya.
