= Battle of Mahrugah =

Battle in Libya (1913 -1914)

- Part of the First Italo-Senussi War
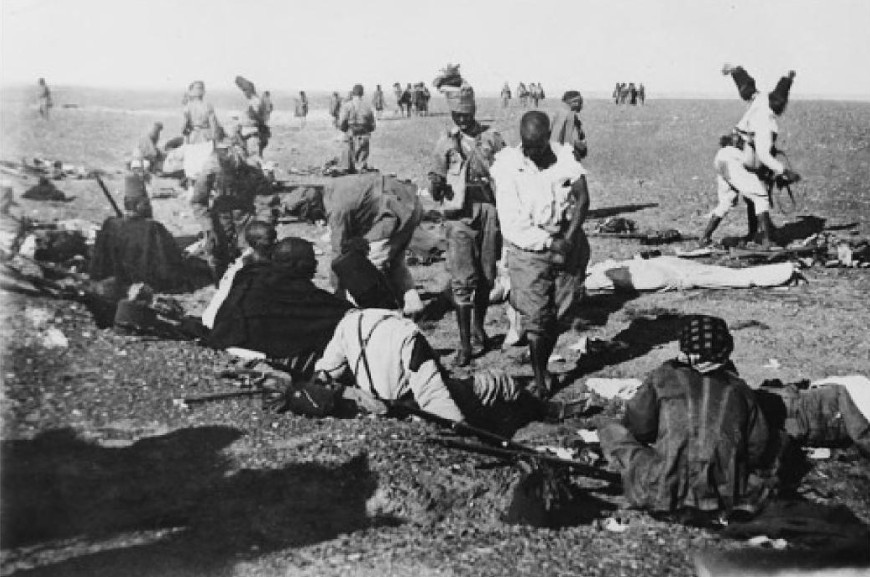
- Medication post near Mahrugah after the battle.
Date	24 December 1914
Location	Mahrugah, Brak, Libya
Result	Italian victory

Belligerents
Italy	Senussi

Commanders and leaders
Antonio Miani	Muhammad ben Abdallah †

Strength
1,100 men	1,000–3,000 tribesmen

Casualties and losses
Unknown, light	600 killed, including 15 chieftains

The Battle of Mahrugah, on 24 December 1913, saw the occupation of Fezzan, a region of Libya held by Senussi tribesmen under the command of Muhammad ben Abdallah, by the Italian soldiers of General Antonio Miani.

== Background ==
After the Italo-Turkish War and the Italian conquest of northern Libya in 1911–1912, despite the Ottoman withdrawal from the region, Italy faced severe anti-colonial resistance by local Senussi tribes. Ahmed Sharif as-Senussi was the first guerrilla to organize the tribes to fight together for the jihad against the Italians in early 1913. Sulayman al-Baruni, initially choosing for a peaceful solution with the Italians, changed his mind and declared the self-established Tripolitanian Republic, probably because of influence from local Arab guerrillas, such as Shaykh Suf al-Mahmudi and Muhammad ben Abdallah, who believed that the only solution for autonomy was a fight against the Italians. His republic was supported by the Ottoman state with money and arms. However, after the battle of Al-Asaba'a on 23 March, the Republic had dissolved, and most of the Arab guerrillas that had fought in the battle fled the scene. Muhammad ben Abdallah and 1,000–3,000 of his fighters fled to Fezzan to continue the resistance.

== Battle ==
Minister Bertolini assigned Lieutenant Colonel Antonio Miani, a distinguished commander of native troops from Eritrea, to occupy Fezzan. On 9 August 1913, Miani's modest expedition, 1,100 soldiers (mostly Eritreans and Libyans, only 108 Italians), 10 cannons, 4 machine guns, 4 trucks, and 1,756 camels, departed from coastal Sirte toward the oases of Socna, Murzuq, and Ghat. Despite being labeled "formidable," General Luigi Cadorna later called it "one of the most reckless and untimely attempts in colonial history." Before engaging the enemy, Miani had to construct 50 kilometers of road through the Black Mountain's lava rocks, though he subsequently won two battles at esc-Scebb and at Eschida. On 24 December, at Mahrugah, the Italian forces routed the Arab guerrillas, killing ben Abdallah and 600 of his fighters. 15 of the killed were discovered to be rebel tribe chieftains.

== Concequences ==
The main Italian force remained in Sabha until 27 February 1914, consolidating control as numerous delegations of notables surrendered. Following victories and small-scale operations, the Italians entered Murzuq without resistance on 3 March 1914, where the city notables handed over the town and its weapons, pledging cooperation. The Italian flag was ceremonially raised in Murzuq's citadel square, proclaiming Fezzan under Italian sovereignty. The final achievement of this period was occupying Ghat on 12 August 1914, just before World War I's outbreak forced Italian withdrawal and sparked renewed insurrection in Tripolitania.

== Bibliography ==
- Ahmida, Ali Abdullatif (2011). The Making of Modern Libya (2nd ed.). New York University Press. ISBN 978-1-438-42893-2.
- Del Boca, Angelo (2010). Mohamed Fekini and the Fight to Free Libya. Springer. ISBN 978-0-230-11633-7.
- Simon, Rachel (1987). Libya Between Ottomanism and Nationalism. K. Schwarz. ISBN 978-3-922-96858-0.
- Soave, Paolo (2001). Fezzan: il deserto conteso (1842-1921) [Fezzan: the disputed desert (1842-1921)] (in Italian). A. Giuffrè. ISBN 978-8-814-09076-9.
- Giglio, Carlo (1971). "Spedizione Miani al Fezzan (1913-1915)". Inventario delle fonti manoscritte relative alla storia dell'Africa del nord esistenti in Italia [Inventory of manuscript sources relating to the history of North Africa existing in Italy] (in Italian). BRILL. ISBN 978-90-04-59976-5.
