= Western Libya clashes (2016–2018) =

Conflict resulting from an attempted coup d'état

- Part of the Libyan Crisis (2011–present) and the Second Libyan Civil War
Date	14 October 2016 – 14 November 2018 (2 years and 1 month)
Location	Western Libya
Status	Ceasefire; The Rixos Al Nasr Hotel, the Government Palace, and some ministries located in Tripoli are seized by the Presidential Guard in October 2016; The GNA maintains control of Tariq al-Sikka Palace and the Abu Sitta Naval Base; New clashes erupted in December; Libyan National Guard entered Tripoli in February.; GNA recaptures Rixos Al Nasr Hotel and Guest Palace complex in March 2017; GNA forces all GNC-loyal militias from Tripoli; Fighting erupts around the outskirts of Tripoli after pro-GNC forces withdraw from Tripoli on 29 May 2017; LNA forces launch an offensive in 2019 to take Tripoli from the GNA

Belligerents
(Libya) Government of National Accord; Ministry of Interior; Al-Bunyan al-Marsous; Abu Sleem Central Security Force; Tripoli Revolutionaries Brigade (TRB); Zintan Brigades	(Libya) National Salvation Government (2016-17); Presidential Guard; Misrata Brigades; Libyan National Guard; (Libya) High Council of Revolution Popular Front for the Liberation of Libya Other militias

Commanders and leaders
(Libya) Fayez al-Sarraj (Prime Minister) (Libya) Ahmed Maiteeq (Libya) Abdulrahman Sewehli (Libya) Abdul Ghani al-Kikli (Abu Sleem CSF leader) (Libya) Haytham Tajouri (TRB leader)	(Libya) Khalifa al-Ghawil (WIA) (Libya) Awad Abdul Saddeq (Libya) Ali Ramali (Libya) Omar al-Hassi Mohammed Al-Abdalli (POW); Al-Mabrouk Ehnish (POW) Ahmed Dabbashi (Leader of Anas al-Dabbashi Brigade); Khaled Al-Sharif (Leader of Security Department Forces); Al-Nimri Al-Mahjoubi (Leader of Al-Nimri and Brothers)

Casualties and losses
Unknown	Unknown

Clashes occurred in western Libya since 14 October 2016, when a coup d'état attempt was conducted by the former head of the National Salvation Government (GNS), Khalifa al-Ghawil, against Prime Minister Fayez al-Sarraj, the head of Libya's Government of National Accord (GNA). This evolved into fighting between the GNA and GNS for control of Tripoli and parts of western Libya, while pro-GNA militias also attacked other militias for control of the region.

== Background ==
Following the First Libyan Civil War and the fall of the Libyan Arab Jamahiriya, the country had been in a state of discord and infighting. In 2014 the General National Congress was dissolved and new elections were called for the newly formed House of Representatives; following the election, Abdullah al-Thani was appointed as new prime minister.

In the meantime, Field Marshal Khalifa Haftar launched Operation Dignity, a massive military operation against Islamic militias. This caused an escalation of violence, resulting in the beginning of the Second Libyan Civil War. Because of the constant violence, the Government and the House of Representatives were forced to abandon Tripoli and relocate to Tobruk.

On 6 September 2014, a faction of former Islamists MPs took control of Tripoli and re-established the General National Congress. The New GNC appointed a National Salvation Government (NSG) and elected Khalifa al-Ghawil as prime minister. Since then, two rival government existed in Libya, one based in Tripoli and the other in Tobruk.

On 5 April 2016, the United Nations brokered an agreement to create a Government of National Accord (GNA), with Fayez al-Sarraj as prime minister: the proposal was rejected by both factions. In the following weeks GNA and allied militias took control of Tripoli and terminated NSG, also dissolving the New GNC and establishing the Presidential Council and the High Council of State (HCS).

The Tobruk government and its militia in the east led by Marshal Khalifa Haftar opposed the GNA. His forces had taken over the four key oil ports of Essidra, Ra's Lanuf, Brega and Al-Zueitina, but were cooperating with the GNA to permit oil exports.

On 31 August 2016, a 94-member rival to the HCS was proclaimed in Benghazi and its members offered to join the official HCS. On 10 October, the HCS's headquarters was attacked by unknown gunmen.

== Coup d'état attempts ==
Late on 14 October, al-Ghawil proclaimed the reinstatement of the former GNS, having taken over the offices of a key consultative body of the GNA at the Rixos Hotel, a complex of administrative buildings and a television station, with GNA forces pulling back in the late afternoon without violence. The GNS supporters said the GNA was "void" and that they had replaced it. Al-Ghawil also declared all members of the GNA "suspended from their duties." He also said: "The presidential council was given chances one after another to form the government, but it has failed...and has become an illegal executive authority." He called for a new administration to be formed by the former Tripoli and Tobruk governments. He further claimed that all institutions including banks, the judiciary, and local authorities were under their jurisdiction.

The following day, the GNS-supporting militiamen in pickup trucks with mounted machine guns remained in place, though Tripoli was calm after the events. Meanwhile, the GNA posted images on social media showing its Presidential Council and ministers holding a meeting in the main offices of parliament in a different part of Tripoli, though earlier reports suggested they may have been in neighboring Tunisia. The GNA then reacted by threatening to arrest "those politicians who... attempt to create parallel institutions and destabilise the capital," while also condemning "efforts to sabotage the political agreement" and denounced the seizure of the Council of State building by an "armed group."

On 16 October, forces loyal to al-Ghawil sent reinforcements to protect the parliament building. They also seized the Government Palace. On the same day, fighting near a refugee camp in the area of Fallah, near the road to the airport, led to the death of at least one woman. Six other people, including a child, were wounded. The Presidential Guard then also pledged allegiance to the GNS. It was reported by Jeune Afrique that the Presidential Guard dropped the GNA because of unpaid wages.

On 17 October, Ghwail claimed on television that the GNS had fully taken control of the capital. Clashes between Ghawil forces and policemen also occurred.

== Further clashes ==
=== 2016–17 ===
On 28 November, representatives from House of Representatives (HoR) and GNC met in Tripoli to reach a deal and form a new government. On 1 December, Omar al-Hassi announced the formation of the High Council of Revolution, a parallel executive body.

Clashes occurred in Tripoli between the two sides from 1 to 2 December after pro-GNA militias attacked pro-GNS militias. 8 people were killed, including civilians, while more than 20 were wounded. Clashes were reported in many areas including Rixos hotel. A ceasefire agreement was reached the next day. The agreement required two armed groups in the Al-Nasr Park in Bab Benghashir areas to leave and hand the location to the Presidential Security Personnel of the Salvation Government before being transferred to the control of Youth and Sports Ministry. Clashes erupted again between Tripoli and Misratan militias on 4 December due to disputes over the control of territories.

GNS claimed it had seized the buildings of ministries of defence, labour and the "martyrs and the wounded" on 12 January 2017. A GNA spokesman later confirmed that the militias had tried to seize the buildings, however stated they were unsuccessful.

On 2 February 2017, clashes in western Tripoli district of Janzour near Bridge 17 broke out between Wirshefana militias and the Fursan Janzour brigade, with some sources suggesting up five people have been killed and 15 wounded.

On 8 February, clashes occurred in Abu Sleem as well as Saladin district between Abu Sleem Central Security Force, which supports the GNA and the Salah al-Burki Brigade, which supports of the GNS and consists mostly of Misratans. Some days prior it had arrested men purportedly belonging to the Libyan National Guard (LNG), which is also loyal to GNS of Ghweill. On 10 February, the newly created LNG entered Tripoli.

On 24 February, 8 people were killed during fighting between GNA and GNS forces in Tripoli's Abu Sleem district. Three of the dead were civilians who were killed when a missile hit Hamza Street. During nighttime on 13 March, clashes erupted between armed residents of Gurji and Hay Andalus backed by Tripoli Revolutionaries’ Brigade against Misratan and Amazigh militias.

The fighting spread to other areas of Tripoli on 14 March. Tripoli Revolutionaries’ Brigade attacked and besieged the Rixos compound, the location of GNC and Salvation Government, in Bab Bin Ghashir district during the night after a night of fighting on 15 May. The Pro-GNA forces had recaptured the Guest Palace complex as well as the Rixos hotel. The office of the Al-Nabaa channel loyal to GNC was attacked by unknown gunmen and was burnt down in the clashes. The channel was taken off-air while Khalifa Al-Ghawil was also reported by one of his aides to have been injured in the clashes. A ceasefire agreement was later signed by GNA members, elders and councils of Misrata and Tripoli, Tripoli High Council for reconciliation and a number of brigades’ commanders from Tripoli, Souq al Jum'aa and Misrata during a meeting at Abu Sittal Naval Base. The agreement called for withdrawal of all armed groups from Tripoli in 30 days. The ceasefire was however rejected by both Tripoli Revolutionaries' Brigade as well as the Abu Sleem Central Security Force on 16 March while renewed clashes were reported.

On 9 May, at least one person was killed and a number of others injured in Tripoli old town and around Musheer marketplace when two rival local militias clashed.

As of 26 May, at least 52 UN-backed Government of National Accord (GNA) fighters had been killed (at least 17 executed) and many others wounded in heavy clashes with rival militiamen in Abu Salim, Hai Damascus, Al-Eddine, Hai Akhwakh, Salahedeen and Qasr Bin Ghashir districts, according to a GNA official. The Tripoli Revolutionaries Brigade attacked the Hadba prison and clashed with the Security Department Forces led by Khaled Al-Sharif, killing at least two guards. The Al-Sharif-led forces pulled out. TRB seized the prison and demolished Al-Sharif's house. The Presidency Council-backed Ministry of Interior meanwhile stated that all prisoners had been transferred, including Saadi Qaddafi and former intelligence chief Abdullah Senussi.

On 28 May, the 7th Brigade of the Presidential Guard (Al-Kani brigade) from Tarhuna, took over the Tripoli International Airport as a neutral side after Misratan militias loyal to Khalifa Ghwell withdrew from there following two days of heavy clashes. TRB's commander Haithem Tajouri rejected the takeover and demanded Kani Brigade to withdraw immediately. Presidential Guard under command of GNA took control of the airport from Kani militia later. This marked the first time in three years that the airport had been controlled by a force loyal to the internationally recognized government. By the next day, the city of Tripoli was fully under control of pro-GNA forces, with all pro-GNC forces withdrawing as a result of clashes with pro-GNA forces.

On 4 July, a family of five were reported to have been killed and at least 32 injured in the early afternoon at a beach near Mitiga airport, when a rocket-propelled grenade exploded beside them. Later on that day, Tripoli Revolutionaries’ Brigade had been sent to the area and the airport was forced to close.

On 7 July 2017, three Libyan National Army (LNA) soldiers belonging to the GNA's Brigade 103, along with two of their friends were found shot dead in Wadi Rabie, near Tripoli International Airport.

On 9 July, heavy clashes reportedly erupted between the National Guard and pro-Serraj forces in Castelverde. A day later, it was reported that GNA-allied militias which came out from Tripoli to block the advance of the pro-GNC forces had withdrawn back to their positions in Tripoli due to unclear reasons.

On 11 July, the Tripoli Revolutionaries’ Brigade (TRB) claimed to be in complete control of Garabulli after three days of fighting which forced more than 85 percent of the town's population to flee. A Tripoli hospital reported four deaths during the fighting, including two foreign workers and 21 injuries. TRB had advanced on the town to block a push on by forces loyal to Khalifa Ghwell. These forces included members of Sala Badi's Samoud militia as well as Benghazi Defense Brigades. Hospitals in Tripoli recorded 4 deaths and 21 injuries, while casualties among the attacking forces were unknown.

Three people, including a civilian, were killed in clashes between Tripoli Revolutionaries Brigade on 1 October and Nawasi Brigade in Tripoli's Gurji district. The TRB forces were reportedly sent to clear Gurji's Massara area from a Nawasi unit led by an extended family, Alwad Radiah, and reportedly succeeded. One of the Alwad Radiah leaders was killed while the third body was unidentified. The fighting had been triggered by Nawasi's attempt to take over TRB headquarters in Shara al-Shatt, though there were no serious clashes except shooting in the air.

TRB forces supported by Brigade 301 and Kani Brigade, attacked Gaddafi loyalists on 4 October 2017. According to TRB sources, they attacked the Gaddafi loyalists in Qasir Ben Ghashir, Sayah and Wadi Rabea; taking control of all their camps while two men from Brigade 301 were killed. The loyalists later fled to Wershiffana. Gaddafi loyalists on Facebook identified the group as "Popular Front for Liberation of Libya".

Fighting erupted between Support Brigade 42 and Abdul-Raoaf Al-Jabari Brigade in Arada area of Tripoli on 6 October, leaving four dead and 17 injured. The cause of the clashes was unclear with reports stating that the fighting erupting after Al-Jabari Brigade attacked Brigade 42 members in Ein Zara on the preceding night, leading to a counter-attack om Al-Jabari Brigade camp in Arada.

The Special Deterrence Forces stated on 16 October 2017 that it had arrested Al-Mabrouk Ehnish, a leader of Gaddafi loyalist-led Popular Front for the Liberation of Libya, as well as a Sudanese national named Emam Al-Faqi. It stated that they were plotting to take control of Tripoli's entrances. The Gaddafi loyalists on return threatened to shut off the water supplies from the Great Man-Made River if they didn't release Al-Mabrouk. His brother threatened to cut off all water supplies and shut down oil and gas fields if he wasn't released within 72 hours. Another demand for Al-Mabrouk was later made on 19 October, with threats to blow up the gas pipeline if he wasn't released in 72 hours. The group meanwhile carried out its threat to shut down the water supply. The group temporarily blocked the Tripoli-Sebha road on 22 October.

Clashes between the Special Deterrence Forces (Rada) and armed youth from the Ghararat region of Soug al Ju'maa led to suspension of flights in morning on 16 October from the Mitiga International Airport. The airport was closed again in the evening and in the morning on the next day due to clashes. The clashes began when Rada had conducted raids in Ghrarat. Rada spokesman Ahmed Bin Salem said the group targeted in the raids had tried to attack the airport area after a wanted drug dealer was killed when he fired on their patrol. He added that Ghrarat was now under their control and was being treated as a military zone. He also stated that one Rada member was killed while two were wounded, with the opposition receiving several casualties.

Clashes continued in Ghararat despite Rada's declaration. The Port of Tripoli was closed by militiamen in the afternoon on 17 October. The Central Security Force, known as Nawasi Brigade, had attacked the port in an attempt to expel Brigade 50 which had been controlling it for years. The Nawasi Brigade said that it was fighting to expel an armed group and hand to port over to state authorities. Flights resumed at Mitiga airport on the next day. A Tripoli Security Directorate source meanwhile stated that the central security forces had taken over the Tripoli port, adding that the armed group stationed there illegally was expelled.

Violent clashes broke out on 25 November between a security force trying to arrest Nour Al-Deen Baba, accused of murdering 7 people, and an armed group supporting him in Al-Khums. At least 6 people, including 4 from the joint security room of Misrata, were killed in the clashes. The security forces later controlled the area and arrested 14 gunmen including Baba.

Rada Forces stated that it had been involved in intermittent clashes with the brigade of Bashir Al-Bugra who is a supporter of Khalifa Ghwell. The clashes occurred in the morning of 13 December between the two outside Mitiga International Airport. A pilot of a military helicopter was reported to have been killed in the clashes.

==== Sabratha clashes ====
Clashes broke out on 17 September in Sabratha between the newly formed IS-fighting Operations Room group as well as a local militia of Annas Dabbashi, known for payments by Italy to human trafficking gangs to stop the flow of migrants from the city, leaving one person dead and several others injured. There was a temporary ceasefire on 20 September to allow elders from Zintan and Zawia to negotiate a permanent ceasefire. Both the combatants were supposedly under the authority of the Presidency Council. The negotiations collapsed with clashes intensifying on 21 September. 5 were killed and 20 injured by 21 September. The Anti-IS Operation Room captured the downtown Qamar hotel on 23 September, killing three members of the rival 48th Battalion. By 29 September, the AIOR had extended control to the Roman ruins of the city. AIOR captured the city by 6 October. 43 were killed and 340 injured in the clashes according to the health ministry.

==== Wershiffana offensive ====
Fighting broke out in Wershiffana district in western Libya between local armed groups and forces led by western military zone commander Osama Jowaili, who was appointed by the Presidential Council. Per reports from the area and statement of the district's Council of Elders the clashes had intensified around Checkpoint 60. Serraj-linked forces attacked Libyan National Army's fourth brigade headquarters. Local residents and military sources reported military forces inching in from Zintan towards Aziziya. The Zintan Brigades said it was targeting crime scenes and outlaws. It also called on residents to stay away from gatherings and areas of clashes. LNA special operations commander Major Imad Trabelsi meanwhile denied reports of alliance with GNA.

Tripoli Revolutionaries Brigade announced on 4 November about taking part in the military operations against criminal groups and to clear Jafara and Aziziya. It stated that Wershiffana was a stronghold of many criminal groups including Popular Front for the Liberation of Libya, a military opposition wing loyal to Muammar Gaddafi. The joint forces announced complete control over Wershiffana on 8 November in addition to capturing three prominent leaders of the rival groups, including Mohammed Al-Abdalli alias "Al-Suborto." Abdullah Al-Fak'hal, media official of Zintan's Military Council, stated on 10 November that 70 people had died in the clashes in the area in the past few days and they had completely stopped.

Ahmad Hamza of Libya's National Commission for Human Rights stated on 12 November that 28 bodies with bullet wounds and torture marks were discovered near Al-Hira, a town of Wershiffana area. He claimed that the victims were opponents of pro-government forces.

=== 2018 ===
Militias loyal to the GNA, led by Osama al-Juwaili, attacked local fighters in Abu Kammash, a village near Zuwarah, a smuggling hotspot. The attack was launched on 5 January 2018 over the vital Ras Ajdir border crossing. The goal was said to be aimed at suppressing criminal activity and asserting control over Libya's borders. GNA's forces and the municipal council of Zuwarah reached an agreement to stop all military operations in the area on the next day.

Heavy clashes erupted in Tripoli on 15 January, resulting in the Mitiga airport being shut. At least 20 were killed and 60 injured according to a health ministry official. Rada force stated that it had come under attack from 33rd Brigade, a militia that generally opposes the GNA. The attack was repelled and an operation was undertaken to secure the area. The gunmen had attacked the airport to apparently free prisoners in the neighbouring building. A number of planes were damaged during the clashes. The airport reopened on 20 January. Rada issued a statement on the next day, stating it had arrested 61 militants involved in the attack.

A security source stated on 21 February that clashes broke out between the presidential guard and a gang in Al Maya. A leader of the gang controlling the Sahara bank and three clerks were killed. Fursan Janzour Brigade closed the road connecting Tripoli to cities and districts due to attacks by gangs and bandits as well as their control of the road in Al Maya.

5 members of the "Al-Nimri and Brothers" gang were killed when they were besieged by security forces in Sorman on 15 March. One of the members was injured. Al-Nimri and Brothers is considered one of the most dangerous armed gangs in Libya, with its members being suspected in over 30 murders and kidnappings. The gang is headed by Al-Nimri Al-Mahjoubi who was arrested in the raid, while four of his brothers were killed.

On 18 September 2018, new clashes occurred in Tripoli between pro-GNA forces and the 7th Brigade militia from Tarhuna. The warring parties signed a ceasefire to end the clashes on 25 September. Clashes erupted again briefly on November 14, 2018, between 7th Brigade and Abu Saleem Central Security Force, but ended after a ceasefire. Sources close to Khalifa al-Ghwail said the clashes occurred due to the Palermo Conference lacking any resolutions to expel pro-Sarraj militias from Tripoli.

== Aftermath ==
The Libyan National Army led by Khalifa Haftar, launched an offensive to seize Tripoli from the Government of National Accord on 4 April 2019.

== Reactions ==
=== Domestic ===
On 15 October, al-Ghawil was accompanied by Awad Abdul Saddeq, first deputy president of the GNC, and the former head of the Presidential Guard, Ali Ramali, in calling upon Abdullah al-Thani, the head of the interim government in Beida, to join him in forming a national unity government.

On 19 October, Abdulrahman Asswehly, the head of the High Council of State, urged al-Ghawil's loyalist forces to leave the buildings that they had taken over from the GNA.

On 24 October, Fayez al-Sarraj said that he could use force to oust Ghawil forces from Tripoli.

On 5 November, Khalifa Al-Ghawil attended operation of a gas turbine of Al-Khums power station. Meanwhile, Ahmed Maiteeq and his delegation including Presidential Council-selected steering committee for General Electric Company were ordered to leave the city. The Tripoli Court of Appeal had ruled against the appointment of the steering committee while the current management which is loyal to Salvation Government was ordered to stay in office. Tripoli Revolutionary Brigades issued a statement calling on the Presidential Council to commit to Skhirat agreement or declare it as a failure, while blaming GNA for deteriorating living and security conditions in Libya. It also urged Khalifa Haftar to be stopped from carrying out a possible coup. Meanwhile, a militia calling itself "The Brigades of Revolutionaries in Libya" rallied in Tripoli's Martyr Square, calling for a national dialogue while rejecting foreign moves to resolve the country's political crisis. It accused the Presidential Council of deteriorating the situation in Libya while also criticising attacks on and seizure of governmental institutions during the coup.

After the clashes in mid-March, protests against militias were held in Tripoli on 18 March. Some pro-Haftar protestors were also present amongst the protestors. Shootings by gunmen to intimidate and disperse the protesters were also reported. In response to the protests, Misratan members of the House of Representatives stated that they were suspending all contacts with the Presidential Council until it apologized for the inflammatory statements which it alleged the protestors had made against Misrata. Misratan fighters and their supporters also closed the Dafnuya checkpoint on road from Misrata to Tripoli, demanding the release of all those kidnapped in Tripoli based in their opinions. They also demanded handing back of Guest Palaces to GNS as well as apology for attack on Rixos compound. It also called for mobilisation of Misratan fighters against what it alleged was a "conspiracy" in Tripoli, claiming it was being run by followers of Khalifa Haftar. Haftar meanwhile warned the militias to leave Tripoli, warning them that the Libyan National Army will attack them if they didn't and also condemned the attack on pro-Haftar protesters.

=== International ===
- United Nations – Secretary-General Ban Ki-moon's Special Representative for Libya Martin Kobler condemned the incident and warned it could sow "further disorder and insecurity." On 23 October, Martin Kobler, also urged them to leave the buildings.
- Turkey - Turkey condemned the GNC coup and the Turkish president's delegate, Emrullah İşler said "Turkey will keep on supporting the GNA and the political agreement signed in Skhirat resort, Morocco last December in order to see peace prevail in Libya," in a statement during a meeting with Libyan officials.

== See also ==
- 2014 Libyan coup d'état attempts
