= Khalifa al-Ghawil =

Libyan politician (born 1963)

Khalifa al-Ghawil خليفة الغويل

Prime Minister of the National Salvation Government of Libya
- In office 14 October 2016 – 16 March 2017 (disputed)
- Preceded by: Position re-established
- Succeeded by: Fayez al-Sarraj (as Chairman of the Presidential Council under the Government of National Accord)
- In office 31 March 2015 – 5 April 2016 (disputed); Acting: 31 March 2015 – 1 December 2015
- President: Nouri Abusahmain
- Preceded by: Omar al-Hassi
- Succeeded by: Fayez al-Sarraj (as Chairman of the Presidential Council under the Government of National Accord)

Personal details
- Born: 1963 (age 62–63) Misrata, Libya
- Education: University of Benghazi
- Al-Ghawil's premiership was disputed by Abdullah al-Theni and Fayez al-Sarraj.

Khalifa al-Ghawil, sometimes transliterated as Khalifa al-Ghweil (Arabic: خليفة الغويل; born 1963) or Ghwell, is a Libyan politician. He was the prime minister of the General National Congress-led National Salvation Government in Tripoli.

== Biography ==
Prior to 31 March 2015, Al-Ghawil served as a deputy or aide to Omar al-Hassi, the prime minister of the disputed Tripoli-based government. After al-Hassi was fired as head of the GNC, Al-Ghawil was asked to serve as prime minister for one month, on a temporary basis.

On 1 December 2015, he formed a new cabinet.

The Prime Minister, of the United Nations-supported Government of National Accord (GNA), Fayez al-Sarraj, arrived in Tripoli on 30 March 2016. The following day, it was reported that the GNA has taken control of the prime ministerial offices and that the GNC-appointed Prime Minister Khalifa al-Ghawil had fled to Misrata. On 5 April 2016, the National Salvation Government, which had been led by Al-Ghawil, announced that it was disbanding and conceded power to the Presidential Council.

On 14 October 2016, the Presidential Guard revolted in Tripoli and proclaimed allegiance to GNC, took over the building of the High Council of State and announced the comeback of Ghawil cabinet. Then, fighting occurred between Sarraj loyalists and Ghawil forces.

On 5 November 2016, he inaugurated the Power Station in Al Khums, a city controlled by forces loyal to GNS.

The fighting spread to other areas of Tripoli on 14 March. The Pro-GNA forces had recaptured the Guest Palace complex as well as the Rixos hotel. The channel was taken off-air while Khalifa Al-Ghawil was also reported by one of his aides to have been injured in the clashes. An agreement called for withdrawal of all armed groups from Tripoli in 30 days.

On 28 May, the 7th Brigade of the Presidential Guard (Al-Kani brigade) from Tarhuna, took over the Tripoli International Airport as a neutral side after Misratan militias loyal to Khalifa Ghwell withdrew from there following two days of heavy clashes. By the next day, the city of Tripoli was fully under control of pro-GNA forces, with all pro-GNC forces withdrawing as a result of clashes with pro-GNA forces.

Political offices
Preceded by Omar al-Hassi	Prime Minister of the National Salvation Government of Libya; 2015–2016	Succeeded by Fayez al-Sarraj
Preceded by Position Re-established	Prime Minister of the National Salvation Government of Libya; 2016–2017	Succeeded by Fayez al-Sarraj
