= Legislature of Libya =

Legislature of Libya may refer to:

- Lower house of Kingdom of Libya, Chamber of Deputies, 1951–1969
- Upper house of Kingdom of Libya, Senate, 1951–1969
- General People's Congress (Libya), 1977–2011
- National Transitional Council, 2011–2012
- General National Congress, 2012–2016
  - New General National Congress
- House of Representatives (Libya), since 2014
- High Council of State (Libya), since 2016
