= National Salvation Government =

Government body in State of Libya

National Salvation Government حكومة الإنقاذ الوطني
Provisional Government overview
- Formed: 6 September 2014; 14 October 2016
- Dissolved: 5 April 2016; 16 March 2017
- Jurisdiction: Libya
- Minister responsible: Khalifa al-Ghawil, Prime Minister
- Website: www.facebook.com/GOFNSLY/

The National Salvation Government (Arabic: حكومة الإنقاذ الوطني) was a rival government formed by politicians from the General National Congress's blocs that lost the June 2014 elections in Libya. The NSG was led by Khalifa al-Ghawil. The term Libya Dawn Coalition was used to refer to the armed groups and the wider political movement supporting the NSG. The NSG was one of the major sides in the Second Libyan Civil War from its formation August 2014 until its dissolution in April 2016.

== History ==
=== Formation ===
A faction of the General National Congress (GNC) that claimed to be the legitimate parliament of Libya, but did not represent a majority of the membership of that congress, refused to hand over power to the HoR. The majority of the GNC members belonged to groups now participating in a separate Libyan parliament, the House of Representatives.

The NSG was backed by the Muslim Brotherhood's Libyan party, the Justice and Construction Party, and the "Loyalty to Martyrs Bloc" which consists of other smaller groups allied to the Muslim Brotherhood.

After their landslide defeat in the 2014 elections dominated by low turnout, Islamist parties acting under the leadership of Nouri Abusahmain used two armed groups, the Libya Revolutionaries Operations Room and Libya Shield Force, to take control of the capital Tripoli. In late August, Islamist militias allegedly abducted rivals (whose whereabouts are unknown) and attacked 280 homes. The NSG has rejected affiliation with any of these activities and it is unknown who the exact perpetrators were, with both sides blaming each other.

The leader of the GNC, Nouri Abusahmain, had appointed Omar al-Hassi then Khalifa al-Ghawil as prime ministers.

=== Libyan Political Agreement ===
Members of the House of Representatives and the General National Congress (GNC) signed a United Nations-supported political agreement on 17 December 2015. Under the terms of the agreement, a nine-member Presidential Council and a seventeen-member interim Government of National Accord would be formed, with a view to holding new elections within two years. The House of Representatives would continue to exist as a legislature and an advisory body, to be known as the High Council of State, would be formed with members nominated by the General National Congress.

The Prime Minister of the Government of National Accord (GNA), Fayez al-Sarraj, arrived in Tripoli on 30 March 2016. The following day, it was reported that the GNA took control of the prime ministerial offices and that the GNC-appointed Prime Minister Khalifa al-Ghawil had fled to Misrata. On 1 April 2016, the head of the media bureau of the National Salvation Government announced that the NSG has resigned and handed its authority back to the General National Congress. Media reports also claimed that the General National Congress had "virtually disintegrated".

On April 5, the National Salvation Government of the General National Congress announced that it was resigning, "ceasing operations" and ceding power to the Presidential Council. Following the dissolution of the GNC, former members of that body declared the establishment of the State Council, as envisaged by the LPA.

=== October 2016 takeover ===
On 15 October 2016, forces loyal to the GNC took over the building of the High Council of State and announced the comeback of the Ghawil cabinet. Then fighting occurred between Sarraj loyalists and Ghawil forces.

=== Second withdrawal from Tripoli ===
The fighting spread to other areas of Tripoli on 14 March. The GNA forces had recaptured the Guest Palace complex as well as the Rixos hotel. The channel was taken off-air while Khalifa al-Ghawil was also reported by one of his aides to have been injured in the clashes. An agreement called for withdrawal of all armed groups from Tripoli in 30 days.

On 28 May, the 7th Brigade of the Presidential Guard (Al-Kani brigade) from Tarhuna, took over the Tripoli International Airport as a neutral side after Misratan militias loyal to Khalifa al-Ghawil withdrew from there following two days of heavy clashes. By the next day, the city of Tripoli was fully under control of GNA forces, with all GNC forces withdrawing as a result of clashes with GNA forces.

=== Prime Ministers of the National Salvation Government ===
Incumbent	Office	Since	Until
Omar al-Hassi	Prime Minister of the National Salvation Government	6 September 2014	31 March 2015
Khalifa al-Ghawil	Prime Minister of the National Salvation Government	31 March 2015	1 April 2016
Khalifa al-Ghawil	Prime Minister of the National Salvation Government	14 October 2016	16 March 2017

== See also ==
- Syrian Salvation Government
