= Parliament of Libya =

Parliament of Libya may refer to:

- General People's Congress (Libya) (1977–2011)
- General National Congress (2012–2014, 2014–2016)
- House of Representatives (Libya) (since 2014)
- High Council of State (Libya) (since 2016)
