= Libyan Parliament =

Libyan Parliament may refer to:

- General People's Congress (Libya)
- General National Congress
  - New General National Congress
- House of Representatives (Libya)
- High Council of State (Libya)
