= Zaima =

Zaima is a feminine given name of Arabic origin. Notable people with the name include:

== Given name ==
- Za'ima Sulayman al-Baruni (1910–1976), Libyan writer and activist
- Zaima Beleño (born 1932), Panamanian singer, actress, dancer and vedette
- Zaima Rahman (born 1995), Bangladeshi barrister
