= List of members elected to the General National Congress, 2012 =

A general election was held on 7 July 2012 to elect members to the 200 seats of the General National Congress of Libya. 80 of the seats were to be decided through party-list proportional representation and the 120 other seats were open to individual candidates. Members were elected from 13 constituencies throughout the country.

== Constituency No. 1: Tobruk/ El Guba/ Derna ==
A. Individual List

Tobruk Seats: 3. Candidates: 96

Elected:

• Abdul Sadeq Hamad Abdul Saed Eswedeq – 7,879 (17.89%)

• Othman Idris Ekraem Wagi – 3,863 (8.77%)

• Mohamed Younis Ahmed Al-Manfi – 3,171 (7.2%)

El Guba Seats: 1. Candidates: 14

Elected:

• Abdul Kareem Faraj Hussein Adam – 4,315 (40.49%)

Derna Seats: 2. Candidates: 27

Elected:

• Hassan Eswehel Abdullah Esteta – 13,807 (39.34%)

• Abdul Fattah Khalifa Arwag Ashlewi – 3,936 (11.21%)

B. Party List Seats: 5. Parties standing: 15

National Forces Alliance – 62,061 votes (67.72%) 4 seats won

Elected:

• Munsef Mohamed Ehwel Naseeb

• Ibtesam Saad Essunussi Esteta

• Tawfeeq Ebraek Abdul Salam Othman

• Fareeha Khalifa Mohamed Al-Berkawi

Justice and Construction Party – 8,828 votes (9.63%) 1 seat won

Elected:

• Mansour Ebraek Abdul Kareem Al-Hassadi

== Constituency No. 2: Shahhat, Bayda, Marj, Qasr Libya ==
A. Individual List

Shahhat Seats: 1. Candidates: 18

Elected:

• Fawzi Rajab Al-Aghab Abdullah – 4,196 (31.66%)

Bayda Seats: 2. Candidates: 75

Elected:

• Abd Rabbah Yousef Bu Breg Mikael – 5,445 (13.89%)

• Abdul Hafeed Mohamed Hamad Addaekh – 3,285 (8.38%)

Marj Seats: 2. Candidates: 42

Elected:

• Ezzidden Mohamed Younis Yahya – 2,353 (12.44%)

• Sherif El-Wafi Mohamed Ali – 1,658 (8.76%)

Qasr Libya Seats: 1. Candidates 13

Elected:

• Abdul Aali Anwar Mahmoud Al-Murtada – 1,144, 13.98%

B. Party List Seats: 5 Parties Standing: 14

National Forces Alliance – 48,846 (60.41%) 3 seats won

Elected:

• Najah Salouh Abdussalam Abdul Nabi

• Abdul Jalil Mohamed Abdul Jalil Ezzahi

• Zainab Haroun Mohamed Ettargi

Justice and Construction Party – 6,572 (8.13%) – 1 seat won

Elected:

• Salah Mohamed Hasan Eshaib

National Central Party – 4,929 (6.10%) – 1 seat won

Elected:

• Abdulkarim Salah Yunis Al-Jiash

== Constituency No. 3: Benghazi, Tokra, Al-Abiar, Salloug and Gemenis ==
A. Individual List

Benghazi Seats: 9. Candidates: 258

Elected:

• Saleh Besheer Salah Ajouda – 40,207 (22.61%)

• Suleiman Awad Faraj Zubi – 34,975 (19.67%)

• Mohamed Khalil Ahmed Ezzaroug – 5,634 (3.17%)

• Ahmed Mohamed Ali Yusef Langi – 3,286 (1.85%)

• Faraj Saad Faraj Sasi Al-Werfeli – 3,227 (1.81%)

• Al-Kamel Mohamed Mukhtar Al-Jetlawi - 3,098 (1.74%)

• Omar Khaled Jabar Al Obeidi – 2,936 (1.65%)

• Abdul Munem Faraj Abdul Ghani Al-Waihaishi – 2,734 (1.54%)

• Alladdeen Moustafa Yousef Al-Megaref – 2,378 (1.34%)

Tokra Seats: 2 Candidates: 15

Elected:

• Fehaim Ali Saad Arrateb – 787 (22.77%)

• Salem Mohamed Abdullateef Bu Janat – 579 (16.75%(

Al-Abiar Seats: 2. Candidates: 32

Elected:

• Mohamed Sulima Mohamed Al-Badri – 2,215 (24.74%)

• Mohamed Ejwaili Abdulaali Abdullah – 804 (8.98%)

Gemenis Seats: 1. Candidates: 9

Elected:

• Abdullah Omran Mohamed Al-Gmati – 1,349 (37.95%)

Salloug Seats: 1. Candidates: 13

Elected:

• Najmiddeen Abdul Jalil Saleh Ennemr – 1,066 (19.85%)

B. Party List Seats: 11 Parties Standing: 20

National Forces Alliance – 132,425 (64.46%) – 7 seats won

Elected:

• Ahmed Salem Mansour Ben Swaid

• Amina Mohamed Besheer Mustafa Al-Megherbi

• Ibrahim Hassan Ibrahim Al-Gheriani

• Soad Miftah Hamad Al-Ghdairi

• Ali Arrefaee Faraj Zubi

• Haleema Abdul Matloub Younis Al-Werfeli

• Assaed Saleh Al-Mahdi Al-Haddad

Justice and Construction Party – 23,490 (11.43%) – 2 seats won

Elected:

• Huda Abdullateef Awad Al-Bennani

• Abdul Rahman Abdul Majeed Abdul Hameed Addibani

National Front Party – 14,304 (6.96%) – 1 seat won

Elected:

• Ibrahim Abdul Aziz Ibrahim Sahad

Arresalah – 7,860 (3.83%) – 1 seat won

Elected:

• Mohamed Ammari Mohamed Zaed

== Constituency No. 4: Ajdabiya, Brega, Jalu, Ojala, Ejkherra, Tazerbo and Kufra ==
A. Individual List

Ajdabiya Seats: 4, Candidates: 68

Elected:

• Nouriddeen Suliman Mustafa Sherif – 2,281 (8.99%)

• Mohamed Saad Emazab Ehwaij – 2,215 (8.73%)

• Mousa Faraj Saleh Faraj – 1,742 (6.87%)

• Abdul Salam Khamis Abdul Nabi Al Ajhar – 1,440 (5.68%)

Brega Seats: 1. Candidates: 11

Elected:

• Othman Aed Mohamed Mazkour – 1,578 (44.18%)

Jalu, Ojala, Ejkherra Seats : 1. Candidates: 7

Elected:

• Awad Mohammed Awad Abdul Saddeq – 4,946 (48.03%)

Tazerbu Seats: 1. Candidates: 14

Elected:

• Mohamed Abdul Kareem Abdul Hameed Douma – 276 (16.74%)

Kufra Seats: 2. Candidates: 30

Elected:

• Senussi Salem Omar Al-Ghami – 7,555 (37.75%)

• Hamed Suliman Saleh El-Heta – 7,422 (37.08%)

B. Party List Seats: 3 Parties Standing: 14

National Forces Alliance – 18,516 (30.19%) 1 seat won

Elected:

• Fatma Essa Jumma Essa

Al Hekma Party – 14,479 (26.87%) 1 seat won

Elected:

• Tuati Hamad Ali Al-Eda

National Front Party – 10,985 (17.91%) 1 seat won

Elected:

• Mohamed Yusuf Mohamed Al-Magariaf

== Constituency No. 5: Sidra, Sirte and Jufra ==
A. Individual List

Sidra Seats: 1. Candidates: 11

Elected:

• Saad Ibrahim Bin Sharrada Ibrahim – 2,787 (41.02%)

Sirte Seats: 2. Candidates: 45

Elected:

• Miftah Faraj Saleh Omar Shanbour – 2,424 (16.56%)

• Abdul Jalil Mohammed Abdul Jalil Eshawesh – 2,377 (16.24%)

Jufra Seats: 2. Candidates: 18

Elected:

• Ali Zidan Mohamed Zidan – 4,349 (47.78%)

• Senussi Mohamed Senussi Eddubri – 1,468 (16.13%)

B. Party List Seats: 4 Parties Standing: 8

National Forces Alliance – 9,717 (33.19%) 1 seat won

Elected:

• Mohamed Ahmed Miftah Al-Arrishiyah

Al Watan for Development – 6,919 (23.63%) 1 seat won

Elected: Imtair Miftah Othman El Emharher

Central Youth Party – 3,517 (12.01%) 1 seat won

Elected:

• Saleh Younis Naji Misbah

Justice and Construction Party – 3,325 (11.36%) 1 seat won

Elected:

• Amna Faraj Khalifa Emtair

== Constituency No. 6: Sebha and Wadi Eshatti ==
A. Individual List

Sebha Seats: 4. Candidates: 96

Elected:

• Abdul Qader Omar Mohamed Ehwaili – 3,383 (9.94%)

• Abdul Jalil Gaith Abu Baker Omar Saif Ennasr – 2,482 (7.29%)

• Mohamed Abdullah Mohamed Ettumi – 2,353 (6.92%)

• Mohamed El Menawi Ahmed Al-Hudairi – 2,111 (6.20%)

Wadi Eshatti (Brak) Seats: 1, Candidates: 15

Elected:

• Mohamed Besheer Misbah Bin Meskeen – 676 (16.23%)

Wadi Eshatti (Al Gurda) Seats: 1. Candidates: 30

Elected:

• Zidan Misbah Abdullah Mohamed Marzoug – 903 (14.46%)

Wadi Eshatti (Idri) Seats: 1. Candidates: 19

Elected:

• Hamed Abdussalam Abdullah Al-Baghdadi – 811 (16.43%)

B. Party List

i. Sebha Seats: 5 Parties Standing: 21

National Forces Alliance – 9,611 (28.30%) 2 seats won

Elected:

• Soad Mohammed Ali Ahmed Ghannour

• Shukri El Amin Mohamed El Magherbi

National Labaika Party – 3,472 (10.22%) 1 seat won

Elected:

• Fatima Mohamed Abu Bakr Mohamed Al-Abbassi

Justice and Construction Party – 2,829 (8.33%) 1 seat won

Elected:

• Mohamed Ahmed Mohamed Arrish

Libyan National Party – 2,467 (7.26%) 1 seat won

Elected:

• Naji Mukhtar Ali Embarak

ii. Wadi Eshatti (Brak), Wadi Eshatti- Al Gurda, Wadi Eshatti- Idri Seats: 4 Parties Standing: 13

Justice and Construction Party – 2,549 (17.56%) 1 seat won

Elected:

• Saleh Mohamed Al Makhzoum Essaleh

Arrakeeza – 1,525 (10.51%) 1 seat won

Elected:

• Essenussi Erhouma Mohamed Erhouma

Al Watan and Development – 1,400 (9.64%) 1 seat won

Elected:

• Abdul Hadi Ahmed Al-Mahdi Asherif

National Party of Wadi Eshatti – 1,355 (9.33%) 1 seat won

Elected:

• Mohamed Khalifa Mohamed Najim

== Constituency No. 7: Obari, Ghat and Murzuk ==
A. Individual List

Obari Seats: 2. Candidates: 42

Elected:

• Hussein Mohamed Ahmed Mohamed Al-Ansari – 4,207 (21.83%)

• Ali Abdul Aziz Abdul Salam Ali – 1,854 (9.62%)

Ghat Seats: 2. Candidates: 12

Elected:

• Abdulqader Sidi Omar Sidi Eshaikh El-Hash – 1,054 (23.71%)

• Mohamed Ibrahim Makhi Abdulqader – 974 (21.91%)

Murzuk Seats: 4. Candidates: 38

Elected:

• Masoud Abdul Salam Ebaid Ettaher – 6,296 (22.34%)

• Ettaher Mohamed Makni Gouri – 5,215 (18.50%)

• Hammad Mohamed Mohamed Essaleh Ebrekawi – 5,192 (18.42%)

• Abdul Wahab Mohamed Abu Baker Gaed – 5,004 (17.76%)

B. Party Lists

i. Obari Seats: 4. Parties 12

Wadi Al-Hayah Party for Democracy and Development – 6,947 (35.83%) 1 seat won

Elected:

• Abdul Razzaq El Mahdi Emhemed Ezwain

• Nadia Errashid Omar Errashid

Justice and Construction Party – 2,347 (12.10%) 2 seats won

Elected:

• Mona Abu Al-Qasim Omar

Libyan Party for Liberty and Development – 2,240 (11.55%) 1 seat won

Elected:

• Ibrahim Mohamed Eddah Mohamed

ii. Murzuk Seats: 3. Candidates: 11

National Forces Alliance – 7,652 (27.77%) 1 seat won

Elected:

• Ahlam Abdullah Ibrahim Allouwa

National Parties Alliance – 5,725 (20.78%) 1 seat won

• Zinab Shatta Hassan Hamed

Al Ummah Al Wasat Party – 4,989 (18.11%) 1 seat won

Elected:

Mohamed Abdul Nabi Bagi Hussein

== Constituency No. 8: Gharian ==
There were no party lists in Gharian constituency. All seats were for individual candidates.

Gharian Seats: 3. Candidates: 59

Elected:

• Mohamed Yunis Mohamed Ettumi – 16,420 (42.48%)

• Idris Mohamed Mohamed Abu Faed – 2,145 (5.55%)

• Ramadan Embaia Abu Abdullah Khalifa – 1,785 (4.62%)

Al-Asabaa Seats: 1. Candidates: 11

Elected:

• Eddawi Ali Ahmed El-Muntaser – 5,203 (49.02%)

Kekla/ El-Galaa Seats: 1. Candidates: 6

Elected:

• Abdulaziz Ettaher Ehreba Zabasi Al-Kekli – 5,483 (66.91%)

Yefren Seats: 1. Candidates: 16

Elected:

• Suliman Yunis Emhemed Gajam – 4,303 (48.53%)

Arriyaynah Seats: 1. Candidates: 9

Elected:

• Abu’l-Qasim Abdulgader Mohamed Derz – 1,016 (38.33%)

Arrihibat Seats: 1. Candidates: 14

Elected:

• Abu Bakr Ali Ehmouda Dau – 2,065 (51.00%)

Rujban Seats: 1. Candidates: 6

Elected:

• Abu Bakr Mohamed Emhemed Abdulgader – 3,313 (46.66%)

Jadu Seats: 1. Candidates: 12

Elected:

• Saeed Khalifa Essa Al Khattali – 1,645 (35.62%)

Zintan Seats: 2. Candidates: 24

Elected:

• Abdussalam Abdullah Mohamed Nassiyah –1,602 (17.27%)

• Mohamed Abdul Gader Salem Betru –1,522 (16.41%)

Mizdah Seats: 1. Candidates: 22

Elected:

• Ibrahim Ali Mohamed Abu Shaala – 9,279 (68.23%)

Nalut Seats: 1. Candidates: 8

Elected:

• Shabaan Ali Esssa Abu Sitta – 5,294 (49.04%)

Batin Al Jabal Seats: 1. Candidates: 18

Elected:

• Abdulhamid Daw Ali Al-Khanjari – 976 (17.51%)

Kabaw Seats: 1 Candidates: 9

Elected:

• Jumma Ali Saleh Eshawesh – 3,850 (49.61%)

Ghadames Seats: 1. Candidates: 7

Elected:

• Abu Bakr Murtada Mukhtar Emdawer – 3,976 (57.82%)

== Constituency No. 9: Tawergha, Misrata, Bani Walid and Zliten ==
A. Individual List

Tawergha Seats: 1. Candidates: 4

Elected:

• Maree Mohamed Mansour Raheel – 3,572 (67.99%)

Misrata Seats: 4. Candidates: 117

Elected:

• Jumma Ahmed Abdullah Ateega – 15,542 (15.89%)

• Omar Mohamed Ali Abu Leefa – 9,144 (9.35%)

• Hassan Mohamed Ali Lameen – 5,143 (5.26%)

• Sallahiddeen Omar Beshr Badi – 3,960 (4.05%)

Bani Walid Seats: 2. Candidates: 25

Elected:

• Salem Al Ahmar Al Hadi Ali – 5,399 (38.62%)

• Amna Mahmoud Mohamed Takhikh – 3,374 (24.13%)

Zliten Seats: 2. Candidates: 46

Elected:

• Abdullah Ali Abdullah Jawan – 10.077 (21.22%)

• Mohamed Shabban Miftah Al Walid – 6,728 (14.17%)

B. Party Lists

i. Misrata Seats: 4. Parties standing: 11

Union for Homeland – 24,815 (27.08%) 1 seat won

Elected:

• Abdul Rahman Ashibani Ahmed Asswaihli

Justice and Construction Party – 20,503 (22.37%) 1 seat won

Elected:

• Zinab Abu Al-Qasim Abdullah Bayou

National Front Party – 13,669 (14.91%) 1 seat won

Elected:

• Mohamed Ali Abdullah Addarrat

National Forces Alliance – 8,018 (8.75%) 1 seat won

Elected:

• Hana Jebril Essalheen Al-Orfi

ii. Zliten Seats: 3. Parties standing: 9

National Forces Alliance – 25,789 (54.69%) 2 seats won

Elected:

• Omar Mohamed Omar Ehmedan

• Salma Mohamed Emhemed Ekhail

Justice and Construction Party – 7,971 (16.90%) 1 seat won

Elected:

• Abdussalam Ibrahim Esmail Asafrani

== Constituency No. 10: Tarhouna, Emeslata, Khoms Sahel, Khoms Medina and Qasr Al-Akhiar ==
A. Individual List

Tarhouna Seats: 2. Candidates: 44

Elected:

• Annifishi Abdussalam Abdul Manee Abdussalam – 4,926 (22.74%)

• Ahmed Faraj Hassan Assadi – 1,333 (6.15%)

Emeslata Seats: 1. Candidates: 28

Elected:

• Hammed Muammar Emhemed Erwaimi – 3,030 (19.79%)

Khoms Sahel Seats: 2. Candidates: 43

Elected:

• Mohamed Miftah Mohamed Takala – 1,961 (9.75%)

• Abdulmonem Hussein Essadiq Al-Yaseer – 1,553 (7.72%)

Khoms Medina

Elected:

• Akram Ali Jumma Al-Jenin – 4,066 (22.16%)

• Mukhtar Salem Ali Al-Atrash – 3,182 (17.34%)

Qasr Al-Akhiar, Seats 1, Candidates 20

Elected:

• Mohamed Ali Saleem Saleem – 3,849 35.55%)

B. Party List Seats: 3. Parties Standing: 14

National Forces Alliance – 27,957 (50.30%) 2 seats won

Elected:

• Salem Ali Mohamed Alo Hammali

• Ola Fathi Essunussi Asuwaisi

Justice and Construction Party – 7,574 (13.63%) 1 seat won

Elected:

• Emhemed Muammar Abdullah Diab

== Constituency No. 11: Tripoli, Garbulli, Tajoura, Suq Al-Juma, Hay Al-Andalus, Abu Sleem, Ain Zara ==
A. Individual List

Garabulli Seats: 1. Candidates: 17

Elected:

• Ajaili Mohamed Misbah Abu Esdail – 2,400 (26.80%)

Tajoura Seats: 2. Candidates: 28

Elected:

• Mohamed Mohamed Ahmed Sasi – 13,393 (28.34%)

• Mahmous Salama Mohamed Al-Ghariani – 11,128 (23.54%)

Suq Al-Juma Seats: 4. Candidates: 125

Elected:

• Abdulfattah Emhemed Al-Amin Allabeeb – 21,196 (21.29%)

• Ehmeda Saleh Assaid Eddali – 14,336 (14.40%)

• Mohamed Ehmeda Essegir Esmoud – 5,337 (5.36%)

• Jalal Omar Miftah Hassan – 5,292 ( 5.32%)

Hay Al-Andalus Seats: 3. Candidates: 136

Elected:

• Mohamed Ahmed Nasr Abu Esnena – 12,099 (12.32%)

• Nizar Ahmed Yusef Kawan – 8,851 (9.74%)

• Abdurrahman Khalifa Ramadan Al-Shater – 6,807 (7.49%)

Abu Sleem Seats: 2. Candidates: 86

Elected:

• Mahmoud Abdul Aziz Milad Hassan – 14,081 (25.09%)

• Ageela Omran Ageela Bin Miftah – 6,147 (10.95%)

Ain Zara Seats: 2. Candidates: 67

Elected:

• Mahmoud Al Mukhtar Taher Atabeeb – 7,628 (18.34%)

• Abdul Naser Miftah Ahmed Aseklani – 2,074 (4.99%)

B. Party Lists

i. Garbulli, Tajoura, Suq Al-Juma Seats: 3. Parties Standing: 26

National Forces Alliance – 83,213 (50.08%) 2 seats won

Elected:

• Hajer Mohamed Suliman Al-Gaed.

• Khaled Ibrahim Mukhtar Sola

Al-Asala and Renovation Party 16,593 (10.58%) 1 seat won

Elected:

• Ahmed Mohamed Ali Boni

ii. Central Tripoli Seats: 3. Parties Standing: 39

National Forces Alliance – 51,349 (60.45%) 2 seats won

Elected:

• Abdullateef Ramadan Mohamed Al-Emhalhel

• Soad Mohamed Ramadan Soltan

Justice and Construction Party – 5,239 (6.17%) 1 seat won

Elected:

• Mohamed Omran Milad Margam

There were no individual candidates in Central Tripoli

iii. Hay Al-Andalus Seats: 3. Parties Standing: 33

National Central Party – 30,321 (35.39%) 1 seat won

Elected:

• Lamia Mohamed Bin Shaker Asherif

Justice and Construction Party 11,382 (13.28%) 1 seat won

Elected:

• Majda Mohamed Asseghir Al-Falah

Al Asala and Development Party – 6,267 (7.31%) 1 seat won

Elected:

• Safwan Ahmed Omar Milad

iv. Abu Sleem, Ain Zara Seats: 4. Parties: 32

National Forces Alliance – 68,459 ( 64.20%) 3 seats won

Elected:

• Najya Assedeeq Abdullah Bayou

• Nasr Hassan Emegel Mohamed

• Mariam Ali Ahmed Farda

Justice and Construction Party – 5,728 (5.37%) 1 seat won

Elected:

• Fawzia Abdul Salam Ahmed Karawan

v. Janzour Seats: 3. Parties Standing: 24

National Forces Alliance – 30,006 (70.12%) 2 seats won

Elected:

• Ali Ibrahim Saad Asweh

• Soad Misbah Miloud Ertema

Justice and Construction Party – 2,773 (6.48%) 1 seat won

Elected:

• Fathi Al-Arabi Abdul Gader Saleh

== Constituency No. 12: Al Maya, Annasiriyah, Aziziya, Suwani Ben Adam, Qasr Ben Gashir and Emsehel, Essayeh, Esbea ==
A. Individual List

Al Maya Seats 1. Candidates: 24

Elected:

• Mustafa Amer Ali Sola – 2,216 (19.71%)

Annasiriyah Seats: 1. Candidates: 17

Elected:

• Jumma Asswiee Essaeh Ettef – 2,577 (25.72%)

Aziziya Seats: 1. Candidates: 30

Elected:

• Abdulmajid Al Mahdi Miloud Azantuni – 1,997 (15.77%)

Suwani Ben Adam Seats: 1. Candidates: 31

Elected:

• Mustafa Jebril Mohamed Jebril 2,759 (19.38%)

Qasr Ben Gashir Seats: 1. Candidates: 19

Elected:

• Mohamed Misbah Omar Abu Ghamja – 6,208 (24.49%)

Emsehel, Essayeh, Esbea Seats: 1. Candidates: 22

Elected:

• Othman Mabrouk Miftah Al-Ghedwi – 1,743 (11.26%)

B. Party List Seats 3, Parties 18

National Forces Alliance – 55,194 (64.27%) 2 seats won

Elected:

• Abdul Fattah Saad Salem Hablous

• Asia Mohamed Wajdi Al-Marghani

Union for Homeland – 4,281 (4.99%) 1 seat won

Elected:

• Abdullah Mohamed Abdullah Elkabir

== Constituency No. 13: Zawia, Sorman, Sabratha, Ajilat, Zuara, Al-Jmail, Rigdaleen, Ziltin ==
Zawia Seats: 4. Candidates: 149

Elected:

• Mohamed Ahmed Al-Hadi Al-Kilani – 9,785 (11.85%)

• Saeed Miftah Saeed Jarjar – 3,815 (4.62%)

• Ahmed Tawfeeq Al-Haj Ahmed Youqoub – 3,176 (3.85%)

• Mustafa Abdurrahman Ahmed Attriki – 3,052 (3.70%)

Sorman Seats: 1. Candidates: 17

Elected:

• Adel Abdul Hameed Ali Asharshari – 3,525 (19.70%)

Sabratha Seats: 1. Candidates: 22

Elected:

• Salah Masoud Abdussalam Mitu – 10,348 (50.01%)

Ajilat Seats: 1. Candidates: 20

Elected:

• Besheer Mahmoud Mohamed Al-Hosh 2,131 (14.02%)

Zuara Seats: 1. Candidates: 13

Elected:

• Nouri Ali Mohamed Abu Sahmain 8,079 (58.07%)

Al-Jmail Seats: 1. Candidates: 19

Elected:

• Suliman Mabrouk Abdullah Al-Haj – 5,435 (45.75%)

Rigdaleen Seats: 1. Candidates: 13

Elected:

• Ettaher Ali Haram Allateef 1,081 (16.85%)

B. Party Lists

i. Zawia Seats: 4. Parties Standing: 22

National Forces Alliance – 30,234 (37.77%) 2 seats won

Elected:

• Naeema Mohamed Nasr Al Hami

• Fathi Ali Mohamed Erhuma

Justice and Construction Party – 13,219 (16.51%) 1 seat won

Elected:

• Khaled Ammar Ali Al-Mashri

Libya Al-Amal – 6,093 (7.61%) 1 seat won

Elected:

• Abdulhamid Ismail Abdulhamid Yarbu

ii. Sorman, Sabratha, Ajilat, Zuara, Al-Jmail, Rigdaleen, Ziltin Seats: 3. Parties Standing: 20

National Forces Alliance – 43,625 (52.17%) 2 seats won

Elected:

• Nouri Al-Jilani Abdul Salam Al-Jamal

• Asmaa Amara Mohamed Sariba

Justice and Construction Party – 8,374 (10.01%) 1 seat won

Elected:

• Amina Omar Al-Mahjoub Ibrahim
