= Ramadan Asswehly =

Tripolitanian nationalist (1879–1920)

Ramadan al-Suwayhili
- رمضان السويحلي
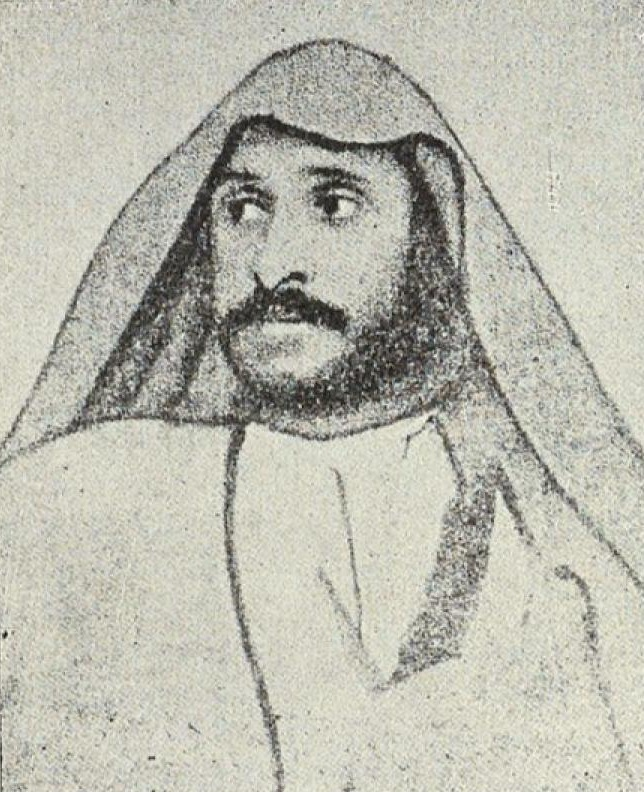

Wali of Tripolitania
- In office 1918–1920 Serving with Sulayman al-Baruni, Ahmad al-Murayid and 'Abd al-Nabi Bilkhayr

Personal details
- Born: 1879 Misrata
- Died: 1920 (aged 40–41) Bani Walid

Ramadan Sewehli, also spelt as Ramadan al-Suwayhili, (Arabic: رمضان السويحلي Ramaḍān al-Swīḥlī) (c. 1879 – 1920) was a prominent Tripolitanian nationalist at the outset of the Italian occupation in 1911 and one of the founders of the Tripolitanian Republic.

He fought for the Ottoman cause against the Italians did during the Italo-Turkish War, but after the conclusion of the 1912 peace treaty, he led a revolt against an Italian column at Sirte. With outbreak of World War I, the Italians withdrew from Misrata. Seeing the advantage, he later took part in the battle of Gasr Bu Hadi against the Italians. For several years, he succeeded in strengthening the town of Misrata as a safe haven for Ottoman forces and an autonomous political district. In 1916, his troops clashed with Senussi forces sent to Sirte to collect taxes from the local population. He is an ancestor of Abdulrahman Sewehli.
