= Battle of Al-Asaba'a =

1913 battle in present-day Libya

- Part of the First Italo-Senussi War
Date	23 March 1913
Location	Al Asaba'a, Gharyan District, Tripolitania (present-day Libya) 32°01′59.99″N 12°52′00.01″E
Result	Italian victory
Territorial changes	Dissolution of the Tripolitanian Republic

Belligerents
Italy	Tripolitanian Republic

Commanders and leaders
Clemente Lequio	Sulayman al-Baruni (WIA); Muhammad ben Abdallah

Strength
5,000–8,273 men	c. 2,000 men

Casualties and losses
36 killed 205 wounded	257 killed Hundreds wounded
- Location of the battle.

The Battle of Al-Asaba'a, on 23 March 1913, saw the end of the Tripolitanian resistance led by Sulayman al-Baruni against Italian colonialism.

== Background ==
After the Italo-Turkish War and the Italian conquest of northern Libya in 1911–1912, despite the Ottoman withdrawal from the region, Italy faced severe anti-colonial resistance by local Senussi tribes. Ahmed Sharif as-Senussi was the first guerrilla to organize the tribes to fight together for the jihad against the Italians in early 1913. Sulayman al-Baruni, initially choosing a peaceful solution with the Italians, changed his mind and established the Tripolitanian Republic, probably because of influence from local Arab guerrillas, such as Shaykh Suf al-Mahmudi and Muhammad ben Abdallah, who believed that the only solution for autonomy was a fight against the Italians. His republic was supported by the Ottoman state with money and arms.

In 1913, the war of resistance begun. The anti-colonial resistance numbered around 16,000 Senussi tribesmen and 5,000–15,000 Tripolitanians. Of the Tripolitanians, 2,000 were stationed at Al-Asaba'a, 1,000 at Rabta el-Garbia, and 500 at Bir el-Ghnem. Al-Baruni's ideas influenced more guerrilla leaders to join his cause such as Musa Grada, Sassi Khazam, Khalifa ben Askar, Yusuf Cherbisc, Mohammed Sof el-Mahmudi, Abubaker Ghirza, and Ali es-Shanta.

== Battle ==
Sulayman al-Baruni attempted to secure autonomy for Berber territories by sending envoys to Rome with demands ranging from full autonomy to special privileges, while simultaneously consolidating power through distributing food during famine and using violence against Arab rivals. He destroyed opponents' homes, threatened Arab chieftains who had reconciled with Italy, and declared himself Emir of the Gebel. However, his ambitions collapsed when Italian Prime Minister Giolitti and Governor Ragni rejected any separate agreements with the Berbers, with Giolitti dismissing al-Baruni as delusional and ordering military action against him in March 1913. Despite Minister Bertolini's initial receptiveness to the Berber delegation's reasonable requests, the Italian leadership unanimously opposed creating autonomous entities in Libya.

The army of the punitive expedition numbered between 5,000, 7,000, and 8,273 men (including 259 officials), and was led by General Clemente Lequio. The opposing force numbered around 2,000 tribesmen. According to Mohamed Fekini, it was the tribal leader Muhammad ben Abdallah who was in charge, and that Al-Baruni played "no role" in the battle. However, modern sources claim that he did in fact participate in battle and even suffered a wound in combat. Nevertheless, on Easter Sunday, 23 March, General Lequio led the Italian troops from Tebedut against al-Baruni's main forces at Al-Asaba'a. The Arab-Berber defenders fought well and attempted a flanking counterattack at 8:30 AM, but were repelled by Eritrean ascaris and the 8th Alpini Regiment. By 11:15 PM, facing encirclement, al-Baruni's forces retreated to Gasr Yafran, leaving 257 dead. Al-Baruni's forces were routed, and with that ceased the existence of the Tripolitanian Republic.

== Consequences ==
According to Francesco Corò's work, the battle of Al-Asaba'a ended "the dream of a Berber principality." Following their defeat, key resistance leaders including al-Baruni, fled into exile. Around 3,000 fighters escaped to Tunisia and surrendered their weapons to French authorities, while another 600 fighters, primarily from the Gibla region and led by Muhammad ben Abdallah, retreated into Fezzan to continue resistance. Taking advantage of the situation, following the initial victory, General Lequio rapidly advanced through the Gebel region against light resistance, systematically occupying key locations: Kikla on 25 March, Gasr Yafran on 27 March, Fassato on 6 April, Josh on 10 April, Nalut on 12 April, and finally the remote oasis of Ghadames on 27 April. Al-Baruni's short-lived autonomous "alpine state" thus collapsed after only five months of existence.

== Bibliography ==
- Ahmida, Ali Abdullatif (2011). The Making of Modern Libya: State Formation, Colonization, and Resistance. Social and Economic History of the Middle East (2nd ed.). State University of New York Press. ISBN 978-1-438-42893-2.
- Baldinetti, Anna (2009). "Italian Colonial Rule and the Muslim Elites in Libya". In Hatina, Meir (ed.). Guardians of Faith in Modern Times: 'Ulama' in the Middle East. Social, Economic and Political Studies of the Middle East and Asia. BRILL. pp. 91–108. ISBN 978-90-47-44293-6.
- Del Boca, Angelo (2010). Mohamed Fekini and the Fight to Free Libya. Italian and Italian American Studies. Springer. ISBN 978-0-230-11633-7.
- Simon, Rachel (1987). Libya Between Ottomanism and Nationalism: The Ottoman Involvement in Libya during the War with Italy (1911–1919). Klaus Schwarz Verlag. ISBN 978-3-922-96858-0.
- Stephenson, Charles (2014). A Box of Sand: The Italo-Ottoman War, 1911–1912. Tattered Flag. ISBN 978-0-957-68927-5.
- Viazzi, Luciano (1978). Gli Alpini, 1872–1945 [The Alpine Troops, 1872–1945] (in Italian). Ciarrapico.
