= Sulayman al-Baruni =

Libyan Ibadi scholar, poet, and statesman (1870–1940)

- سليمان باشا الباروني
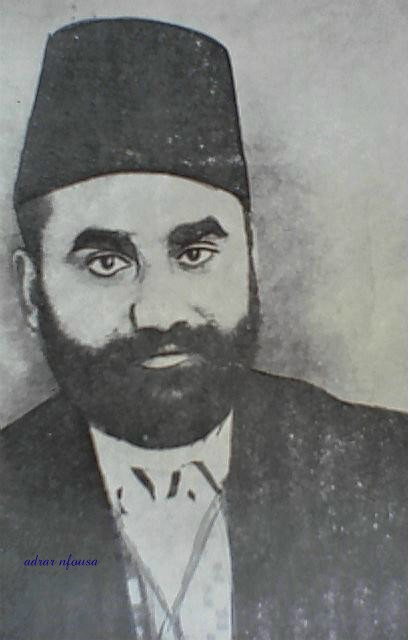
- A photograph of Salayman from 1908

Wali of the Tripolitanian Republic
- In office 16 November 1918 – November 1921 Serving with Ramadan Asswehly, Ahmad al-Murayid and 'Abd al-Nabi Bilkhayr
- Preceded by: Position established
- Succeeded by: Position abolished

Member of the Chamber of Deputies
- In office 1908 – 18 October 1912
- Succeeded by: Constituency abolished
- Constituency: Jabal al Gharbi

Personal details
- Born: c. 1870 Jabal Nafusa, Ottoman Empire (now Libya)
- Died: 1 May 1940 (aged 70) Mumbai, British Raj
- Parent: Abd Allah al-Baruni
- Education: University of Ez-Zitouna; Al-Azhar University
- Occupation: Anti-colonial fighter, Ibadi scholar, poet, statesman

Sulayman al-Baruni (Arabic: سليمان باشا الباروني, romanized: Sulaymān al-Bārūnī; c. 1870 – 1 May 1940) was a Libyan Ibadi scholar, poet, statesman and a prominent figure in the history of Libya.

== Early life and studies ==
Al-Baruni was born in the Jabal Nafusa in what was then the vilayet of Tripolitania, part of the Ottoman Empire, around 1870. He was born to an influential Berber family that belonged to the Ibadi sect of Islam. His father, Abd Allah al-Baruni, was a jurist, poet and theologian. In 1887, he started his studies at the University of Ez-Zitouna in Tunisia, where among his teachers were the reformists, Muhammad al-Nakhli and Uthman al-Makki. Al-Nakhli, a critic of colonialism and Sufism, had the great influence on the young Sulayman. In 1893, after six years of studies, he entered the Al-Azhar University, where he studied for three years. He was exposed to more anti-colonial movements during his stay in Egypt. He also became familiar with Mustafa Kamil's ideas and held him in high regard. After ending his studies in the al-Azhar, he went to the M'zab valley to study under the prominent Mozabite Ibadi scholar Muhammad ibn Yusuf Atfayyash, who taught him Arabic studies, theology, and traditional Ibadi literature.

== Career ==
In Cairo he founded a newspaper and later a printing press. During the reign of Abdul Hamid II, he was arrested several times by the Ottoman authorities on the accusation that he was planning to re-establish an Ibadi imamate or emirate in the Jabal Nefusa. In the general election of 1908, following the Young Turk Revolution, al-Baruni was elected to the Chamber of Deputies as the member for the Jabal Gharbi.

Following the outbreak of the Italo-Turkish War in 1911, al-Baruni immediately began recruiting Berbers to resist the invasion. He played a leading role at the Congress of Aziziyya, a meeting of important Tripolitanian leaders, in late October 1912, following the Ottoman capitulation. He eventually sought an understanding with the Italians in the hopes of creating an autonomous Ibadi principality centred on the Jabal Nefusa and Marsa Zuaga. At minimum he hoped the Berbers would receive special privileges in the new Italian Libya. What remained of Berber resistance in Tripolitania was crushed at the Battle of Al-Asaba'a on 23 March 1913. Al-Baruni and several other leaders who had been connected with the Ottomans, went into voluntary exile in French Tunisia. Italy sent Count Carlo Sforza to Tunisia to persuade the exiles to return. Al-Baruni was the first to be convinced, suggesting to the other that they should return to Tripolitania in exchange for an agreement from Italy that they could retain the position in Tripolitanian society and that their past resistance would not be held against them. Al-Baruni seems even to have been promised Berber autonomy. The Italians also asked him to write a monograph on the Jabal Gharbi.

Al-Baruni did not return until October 1916, when he was appointed governor (Arabic wāli, Turkish vali) of Tripolitania, Tunisia and Algeria by the Ottoman sultan in the midst of the First World War. None of these territories were under actual Ottoman control at the time, but the Ottomans were actively working to organise the war against Italy in Tripolitania. In November 1918, al-Baruni was one of four local notables elected to represent the Tripolitanian Republic that was proclaimed in the aftermath of the Ottoman surrender. With the promulgation of the Legge Fondamentale (Fundamental Law) in June 1919, al-Baruni made his peace with Italy.

By September 1921, as a result of the Italian policy of divide and conquer, there was a civil war in Libya between the Berbers, who increasingly looked to Italy for protection, and the Arabs. Among the Berbers, al-Baruni was widely blamed for this state of affairs. He went into his final exile in November 1921. He traveled to France, Egypt, Turkey and Mecca before settling in Oman. There he was appointed finance minister.

== Death and burial ==
He died on 1 May 1940 while visiting Mumbai in the company of the Sultan of Oman, Said bin Taimur. After his death, his daughter, Za'ima bint Sulayman, gathered some of his papers and published them at Tripoli in 1964 under the title Safahat khalida min al-jihad li'l-mujahid al-Libi Sulayman al-Baruni.

In the 1970s, the new nationalist regime demanded that the bodies of the anti-colonial leaders who died in exile be brought to their homeland. For this reason, in 1970 the body of Sulayman al-Baruni was returned to Libya where he received a national ceremony with great coverage the newspapers and television. The remains of al-Baruni rest in Sidy Moniader Cemetery in Tripoli.

== In popular culture ==
- The Libyan television series, El Zaiman, starring the Moroccan actor Rabie Kati as Sulayman al-Baruni and the Libyan actor Saleh El Qarad as Bashir Saadawi, aired on Salam TV in Ramadan 2020.
