= Khalid al-Mishri =

Libyan politician (born 1969)

Chairman of the High Council of State of Libya
- In office 8 April 2018 – 6 August 2023
- Deputy: Naji Mukhtar
- Preceded by: Abdulrahman Sewehli
- Succeeded by: Mohammed Takala

Personal details
- Born: January 15, 1969 (age 57) Zawiya, Libya
- Party: Justice and Construction Party

Khalid al-Mishri is a Libyan politician who served as the chairman of the High Council of State since 8 April 2018 to 6 August 2023, an advisory body to the Government of National Accord founded in December 2015. He is a member of the Justice and Construction Party, an organisation affiliated with the Muslim Brotherhood.

== High council chairman ==
In November 2018, he attended the Palermo Conference in Italy, which aimed to bring an agreement between the Government of National Accord and Khalifa Haftar's Libyan National Army faction.

Al-Mishri visited Doha in early March 2019, meeting with Tamim bin Hamad Al Thani, the Emir of Qatar, to discuss the situation in Libya.

He visited Russia in March 2019, meeting with the Russian President's envoy for the Middle East and North Africa, Mikhail Bogdanov, and the head of the Federation Council, Valentina Matviyenko. They discussed plans for stabilising Libya.

After the start of General Khalifa Haftar's military operation to take Tripoli from the GNA in early April 2019, al-Mishri visited Istanbul and spoke with Turkish President Recep Tayyip Erdoğan about the situation.
