= Abdulrahman Sewehli =

Libyan politician

Abdulrahman Sewehli عبد الرحمن السويحلي

Chairman of the High Council of State of Libya
- In office 6 April 2016 – 8 April 2018
- Deputy: Saleh al-Makhzoum
- Preceded by: Nouri Abusahmain (Chairman of the 2014 General National Congress)
- Succeeded by: Khalid al-Mishri

Personal details
- Born: 1946 (age 79–80) Alexandria, Kingdom of Egypt
- Party: Union for the Homeland

Abdulrahman Sewehli, also spelt as Abdel Rahman al-Suwayhili, (Arabic: عبد الرحمن السويحلي) is a Libyan politician and the leader of the Union for the Homeland party. He was elected as chairman of the High Council of State on 6 April 2016.

He is the grandson of one of the prominent Tripolitanian nationalist Ramadan Asswehly and one of the founders of the Tripolitanian Republic.
