= Bashir Saadawi =

Libyan politician (1884–1957)

Bashir al-Saadawi
- بشير السعداوي
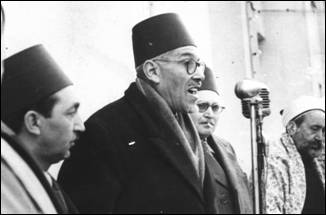
- Bashir al-Saadawi (center)

Personal details
- Born: 1884 al-Khums, Ottoman Tripolitania
- Died: January 17, 1957 (aged 72–73) Beirut, Lebanon
- Party: National Congress Party
- Relatives: Nouri Saadawi

Bashir al-Saadawi (Arabic: بشير السعداوي, ALA-LC: Bashīr al-Saʻdāwī; 1884 – 17 January 1957) was a Libyan politician and the founder and leader of the unitarist National Congress Party.

Bashir al-Saadawi was one of the major figures who contributed to independence of Libya. However, after King Idris I was crowned as King of Libya, all parties were disbanded and Saadawi was exiled to Beirut where he lived for the rest of his life, dying there on 17 January 1957.

His body was returned to be buried in Libya in 1970.
