= Union for Homeland =

Political party in Libya

Union for Homeland الإتحاد من أجل الوطن
- Leader: Abdulrahman Sewehli
- Founded: 2012
- Headquarters: Misrata, Libya
- Ideology: Regionalism; Localism; Populism
- Political position: Centre
- Seats in the General National Congress: 2 / 200

Website
- www.ufh.ly

The Union for Homeland (Arabic: الإتحاد من أجل الوطن, Al-Ittihad min Ajl Al-Watan) is a political party in Libya, founded in 2012. It is mainly based in Misrata District. The party is led by Abdulrahman Sewehli, a prominent opponent of former leader Muammar Gaddafi. The Union advocates strong decentralisation of power on a local level, but rejects federalism. It proposes a semi-presidential system on the French model. The Union for Homeland calls for a consequent break with the old regime and wants to ban figures who held ranks during Gaddafi's government from political influence.

The party won two seats in the Libyan General National Congress election of 2012.
