= Za'ima Sulayman al-Baruni =

Za'ima Sulayman al-Baruni (1910–1976) was a Libyan writer and activist. She was one of the country's first short story writers in the post-independence period, publishing the collection al-Qasas al-Qawmi in 1958.

A forceful proponent of women's education, Baruni established the Libyan Women's Association and was a founding member of the country's Women's Renaissance Association. She was the daughter of the anti-colonial leader Sulayman al-Baruni and worked to collect and publish his papers and poetry after his death.

== Biography ==
Za'ima Sulayman al-Baruni was born in Jadu, Libya, in 1910. Her father was Sulayman al-Baruni, an important Libyan anti-colonial resistance leader, scholar, and poet. Za'ima al-Baruni was able to travel for her education thanks to her father's work, studying Turkish in Istanbul and Arabic in Syria, then returning to study in Libya, where she focused on Arabic.

Baruni supported her father throughout his resistance efforts, then lived with him in exile in India. After her father died in exile in 1940, Baruni settled in Tripoli.

After Libyan independence in 1951, she began working to promote women's education and adult education. She worked for the Ministry of Education and established the Libyan Women's Association to provide classes for women.

She also became a writer, publishing her writing, particularly short stories, in various Arabic-language newspapers and magazines. She often wrote under the pen name Bint al-Watan ("The Daughter of the Homeland").

Baruni is considered a pioneer among women in Libya's literary and activist spheres. She became a founding member of the Women's Renaissance Association (Jamʿiyyat al-Nahda al-Nisaʿiyya) in 1958.

That same year, she published her short story collection al-Qasas al-Qawmi (The National Narrative). It is considered one of the first books of short stories to be published in Libya, and a rare book written by a woman in this period. Al-Qasas al-Qawmi contains stories she had been publishing in periodicals beginning five years earlier in 1953, mostly stories of Libyan history and folklore, with both a pedagogical and nationalist aim. Years later, the critic Fawzi al-Bishti described the collection as "a landmark in the history of the short story in Libya."

Baruni also worked to collect and disseminate her father's work after his death. She published a significant collection of his papers in 1964 under the title Safahat khalida min al-jihad li'l-mujahid al-Libi Sulayman al-Baruni ("Glorious Pages of the Struggle of the Libyan Fighter Sulayman al-Baruni").

Za'ima al-Baruni died in 1976. On the news of her death, the writer Lutfiya al-Qaba'ili hailed her as a pioneer among Libya's literary women.
