= Mohammed Takala =

Libyan politician and architect (born 1958)

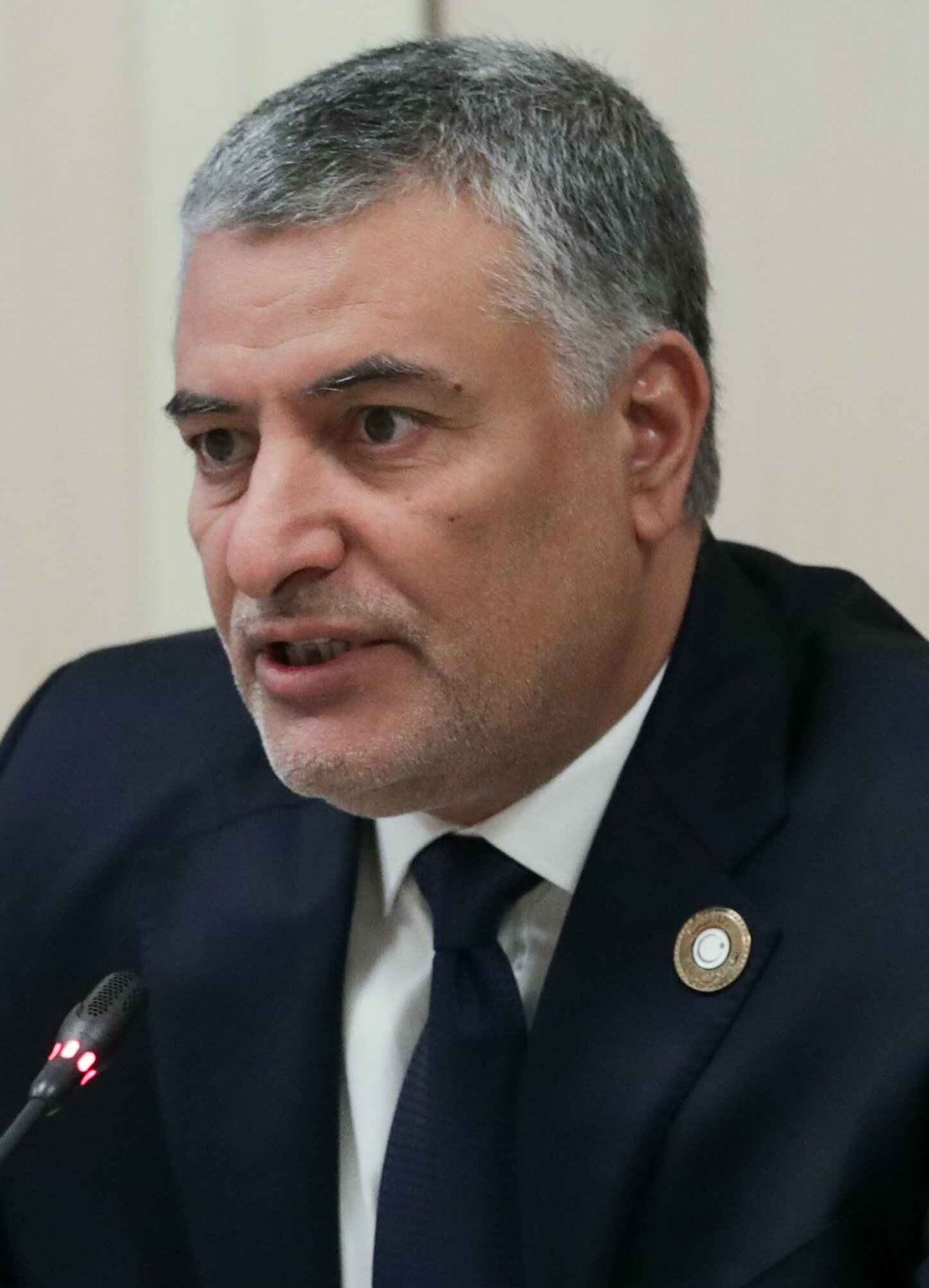
- Mohammed Takala, 2023

Chairman of the High Council of State
- Incumbent
- Assumed office 6 August 2023
- Deputy: 1st Deputy Speaker Naji Mukhtar; 2nd Deputy Speaker Omar Dabushah
- Preceded by: Khalid al-Mishri

Personal details
- Born: January 15, 1966 (age 60)

Mohammed Takala (Arabic: محمد تكالة; born 15 January 1966) is a Libyan politician, university teacher and architect who currently is the Chairman of the High Council of State, one of the prominent main bodies of Libya. Mohammed Takala is currently serving a new term in office in state following his relection in 2026 as Chairman of the High Council of State.
