= Omar al-Hassi =

Libyan politician

Omar al-Hassi عمر الحاسي

Prime Minister of the National Salvation Government of Libya
- In office 6 September 2014 – 31 March 2015 (disputed)
- President: Nouri Abusahmain
- Preceded by: Abdullah al-Theni
- Succeeded by: Khalifa al-Ghawil

Personal details
- Born: 30 March 1949 (age 77) Benghazi, Libya
- Hassi's premiership was disputed by Abdullah al-Theni.

Omar al-Hassi (Arabic: عمر الحاسي) (30 March 1949) is a professor of political science at University of Benghazi and is a Libyan politician. He was the prime minister of the General National Congress-led National Salvation Government in Tripoli.

== Biography ==
Omar al-Hassi was born in 1959. He is a member of the Hassa tribe (قبيلة الحاسة), a powerful tribe in Eastern Libya. He is professor of strategic planning at the University of Benghazi and president of The Middle East and Mediterranean Peace Research Institute.

Omar al-Hassi founded The International Action Group for Peace in Libya with Dr. Mahmoud Refaat on May 12, 2018.

Al-Hassi was the runner-up on April 29, 2014, in the first round of the Libyan parliament's disputed voting for prime minister. The proceedings were later declared illegal by the Supreme Court. He was set to run against Ahmed Maiteeq when gunmen stormed the parliament to prevent a second round vote from taking place on April 29. He served as Prime Minister of the western National Salvation Government from September 6, 2014, to March 31, 2015.

On March 31, 2015, al-Hassi left his position as prime minister and presented his resignation to the GNC officials in Tripoli . Some reports suggested without providing evidence that he lied to legislators about the government's fiscal situation. Al-Hassi said he would consult with his "revolutionary partners," an apparent reference to armed groups that have supported him, before determining whether to accept his dismissal, which he said was made illegally.

== Post prime minister position ==
On 1 December 2016, al-Hassi announced the formation of the High Council of Revolution, which some claimed was a parallel executive body, but this grouping from its establishment refers to itself as the Free Patriots Assembly.

On 12 May 2018, al-Hassi founded with Mahmoud Refaat the International Action Group for Peace in Libya, which accused the UN representatives sent to Libya and leaders of the United Arab Emirates of violating Security Council resolutions relating to Libya. the International Action Group for Peace in Libya was inaugurated from the Tunisian capital Tunis as a political and legal group; mainly composed of Libyan politicians, and international legal experts to sue perpetrators of war crimes in Libya.

Political offices
Preceded by Abdullah al-Thani	Prime Minister of Libya; Disputed; 2014–2015	Succeeded by Khalifa al-Ghawil; Disputed
