= Tripolitanian Republic =

1918–1922 state in modern-day Libya

Tripolitanian Republic الجمهورية الطرابلسية (Arabic) al-Jumhuriyat at-Trabulsiya
- 1918–1922
- Capital: ʽAziziya
- Common languages: Arabic, Berber
- Religion: Islam
- Government: Directorial republic
  - Wali: Ramadan al-Suwayhili
  - Wali: Sulayman al-Baruni
  - Wali: Ahmad al-Murayid
  - Wali: 'Abd al-Nabi Bilkhayr
- Historical era: Interwar period
  - Established: November 16, 1918
  - Disestablished: 1922
Preceded by	Succeeded by
Italian Tripolitania	Italian Tripolitania

The Tripolitanian Republic (Arabic: الجمهورية الطرابلسية, al-Jumhuriyat at-Trabulsiya), was a short-lived Arab republic that declared independence from Italian Tripolitania after World War I. Although the Tripolitanian leaders presented their case at the 1919 Paris Peace Conference, they failed to secure support from Allied powers, and the republic was never internationally recognized. It ultimately collapsed due to internal divisions among its leaders, tribal rivalries, and lack of a unified military force, and Italy reasserted control over the colony in the early 1920s.

== Background ==
Tripolitania had been an Ottoman possession since the 16th century, as the Tripolitania Eyalet and later Vilayet. Its territory was not limited to Tripolitania, however, as parts of Barqa were also controlled by the Pasha of Tripoli. After Tunis and Egypt fell to the French and to the British respectively, Tripolitania was the last Ottoman possession in Africa.

In 1911, the Kingdom of Italy launched an invasion of Tripolitania and annexed the territory after it had defeated the Ottoman troops there. The Italians did not maintain solid control of the region at first. During the Senussi Campaign of World War I, the Senussi Order led a resistance that pushed the Italian forces back to a handful of port cities. The Senussi were supported in that effort by Germany and the Ottoman Empire, as well as by various local tribes and chiefdoms. It was in that context of general chaos in northern Libya that the Tripolitanian Republic was founded.

== Independence ==
The proclamation of the republic in autumn 1918 was followed by a formal declaration of independence at the 1919 Paris Peace Conference.

The capital of the republic was the town of 'Aziziya, 40 km south of Italian-occupied Tripoli, and its territory stretched at its widest from the Nafusa Mountains, near the Tunisian border, to Misrata and the surrounding coast, encompassing all the hinterland between them, the only exceptions being Italian-held Tripoli and Homs areas.

It was governed by a tetrarchy composed of Sulayman al-Baruni, Ramadan Asswehly, Abdul Nabi Belkheir and Ahmad Almarid although they acted autonomously from one other, as they had significant ideological differences. It was the first formally declared republican form of government in Libya and the whole Arab world but gained little support from the international powers.

== Dissolution and re-establishment ==
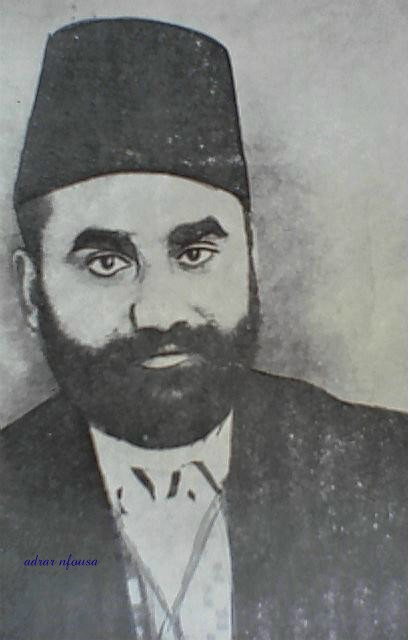
Sulayman al-Baruni, one of the Cyrenaican leaders

The Italian colonial authorities negotiated with al-Baruni and other chiefs and published 1 June 1919 a Colonial Statute for Tripolitania in which the colonial administration would give native Tripolitanians rights to Italian citizenship, recognise Islamic law as the civil law of the colony and provide that the colony would be governed by an Italian governor advised by a ten-member council with eight of those members being elected.

At first, the Tripolitanian leaders were satisfied with the statute officially and dissolved the republic on July 12, but when Vicenzo Garioni, the colonial governor who had negotiated with the rebel leaders, was recalled to Italy in mid-August and the new governor, Vittorio Menzinger did not seem to apply the statute, the former rebel leaders formed the National Party of Islam (Hizb al-Islam al-Watani) to exert pressure on the Italians. The main leaders of the Party were 'Azzam, al-Qarqani and al-Gharyani.

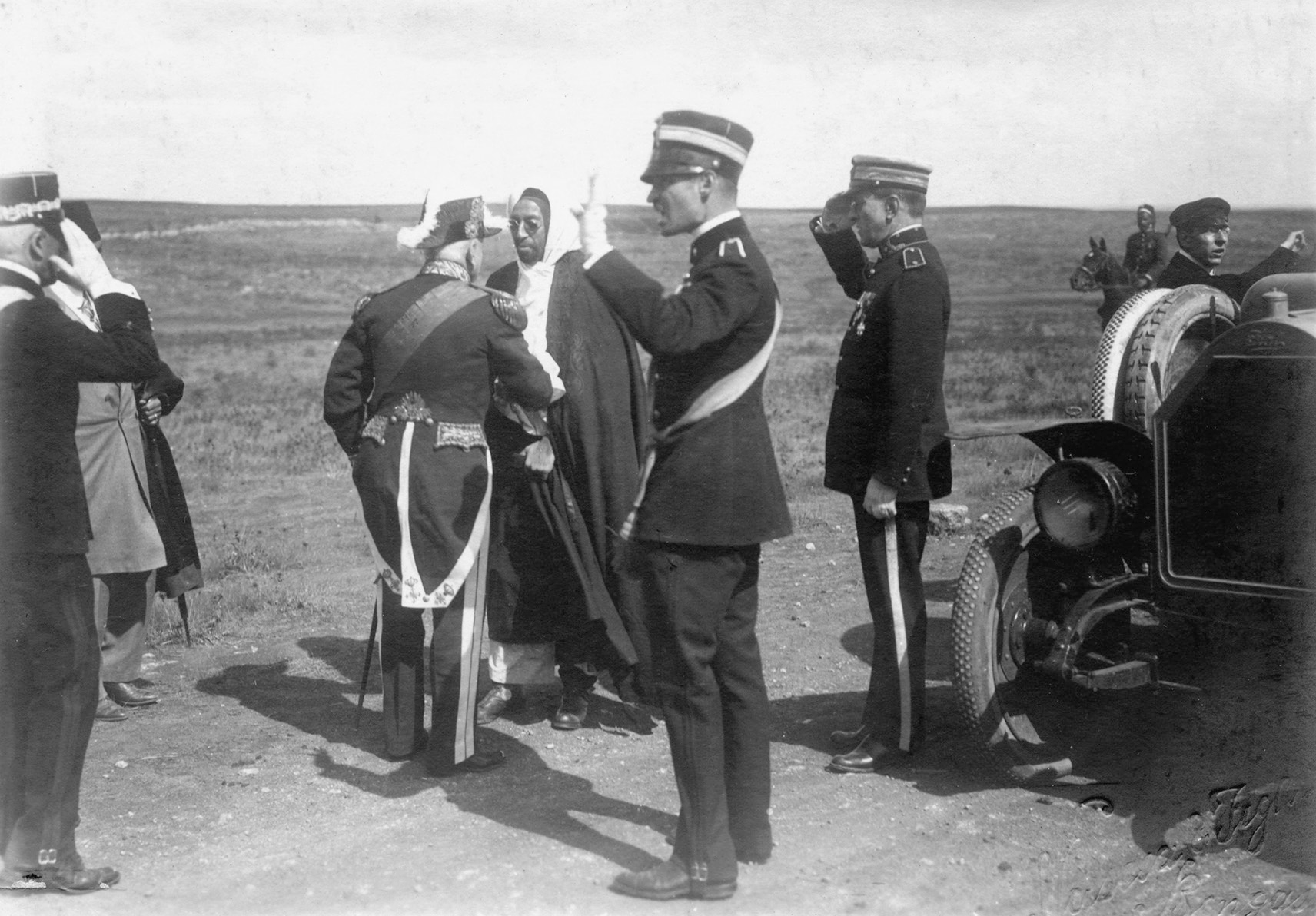
Idris I, emir of Cyrenaica and Tripolitania and future king of Libya, saluted by Italian soldiers in 1919

However, the elections for the council had not occurred by November and so the main leaders and chiefs of Tripolitania declared and re-established the republic on November in Misrata, just four months after it had been dissolved, and the establishment of a governing body called the Reform Committee. In 1920, delegates from occupied and free zones met in 'Aziziya at a National Congress. Claiming to represent the "Tripolitanian Nation", they called for the withdrawal of the Italian forces. The next appointed governors, Luigi Mercatelli and Giuseppe Volpi, turned to the military power to subjugate the region. The division among the insurgents was increasing, and, after the death of al-Suwaylih in August 1920 by political opponents, the rebels started to fracture, and the Republic, still fighting the Italians, fell into civil war.

By early 1922, the Tripolitanians were desperate; met with Senussi delegate, and offered Idris, the leader of the Senussi and the Emir of Cyrenaica to be Emir of Tripolitania. Idris's acceptance, as the nationalists understood, would draw a sharp Italian disapproval and be the signal for the resumption of open warfare. War with Italy, in any event, appeared to be likely sooner or later. For several months, Idris pondered the nationalist appeal. For whatever reason, perhaps to further the cause of total independence or perhaps out of a sense of religious obligation to resist the infidel, Idris accepted the emirate of all of Libya in November and then, to avoid capture by the Italians, fled to Egypt, where he continued to guide the Sanusi Order. By 1923, Italian control was effective in the territories of the Republic, which had not ceased to exist, but still was confined to the Tripolitanian and outer Cyrenaican areas. The rest of the country, still in the hands of the Senussi-led rebels, had yet to be conquered and was pacified only later.

== Organs ==
The short-lived republic established only two government organs: the Supreme Council, whose members formed the "governing tetrarchy" (Sulayman al-Baruni, Ramadan Asswehly, Abdul Nabi Belkheir and Ahmad Almarid), and the Consultative Council, consisting of 24 other chiefs representing various parts of Tripolitania.

== Sources ==
- Anderson, Lisa (1982). Joffe, George; MacLachlan, Keith (eds.). "The Tripoli Republic". Social and Economic Development of Libya. Wisbeck: Menas Press. ISBN 9780906559109.
