= Al-Khums =

Al-Khums الخمس Khoms
- "17 February Martyrs Monument" in Khums center

- Seal

- Location in Libya
- Coordinates: 32°38′59″N 14°15′52″E
- Country: Libya
- Region: Tripolitania
- District: Murqub
- Settled by Berbers and Phoenicians: around 1000 BC (as Lpqy)

Government
  - Governing body: Al-Khums Municipal Council
  - President of the Municipal Council: Khalid Bennour
- Elevation: 6.6 ft (2 m)

Population (2004)
  - Total: 201,943
- Demonym: Khumsi
- Time zone: UTC+2 (EET)
- Area code: 31
- License Plate Code: 6
- Website: http://khoms.gov.ly/

Al-Khums or Khoms (Arabic: الخمس) is a city, port and the de jure capital of the Murqub District on the Mediterranean coast of Libya with an estimated population of around 202,000. The population at the 1984 census was 38,174. Between 1983 and 1995 it was the administrative center of al-Khums District.

== Etymology ==
The name al-Khums or Khoms (Arabic: الخُمس) translated literally to "the quintile" in Arabic. The origin of the name is not clear. Several hypotheses include:

- In Tripolitania the quinary numeral system was used in contrary to most other Arabic cultures, which used the decimal system. Khums and neighbouring villages were famous in producing olives and olive oil. Since the olives had to be counted, residents of other cities started to call the inhabitants 'Khumsi' (Quinary), from which the name Khums derived.
- Khums could be an Arabic translation to the Greek word Pentapolis which means five cities, but this hypothesis is dubious, because Pentapolis and its cities are in Cyrenaica.
- Another hypothesis is that during the 16th century, al-Khums produced a quintile (20%) of the Ottoman Tripolitania province's olive oil.

During the Italian occupation of Libya, the city was called Homs in official Italian sources.

== History ==
=== Leptis Magna ===
The city was founded by the Phoenicians around 1000 BCE, who gave it the name Lpqy. Written LPQ (Punic: 𐤋𐤐𐤒) or LPQY (𐤋𐤐𐤒𐤉). This has been tentatively connected to the Semitic root (present in Arabic) LFG, meaning "to build" or "to piece together", presumably in reference to the construction of the city.

The town did not become prominent until Carthage became a major power in the Mediterranean Sea in the 4th century BCE. It nominally remained part of Carthage's dominions until the end of the Third Punic War in 146 BCE and then became part of the Roman Republic.

Soon Roman merchants settled in the city and started a profitable commerce with the Libyan interior. The republic of Rome sent some colonists together with a small garrison in order to control the city. Since then the city started to grow and was even allowed to mint its own coins.

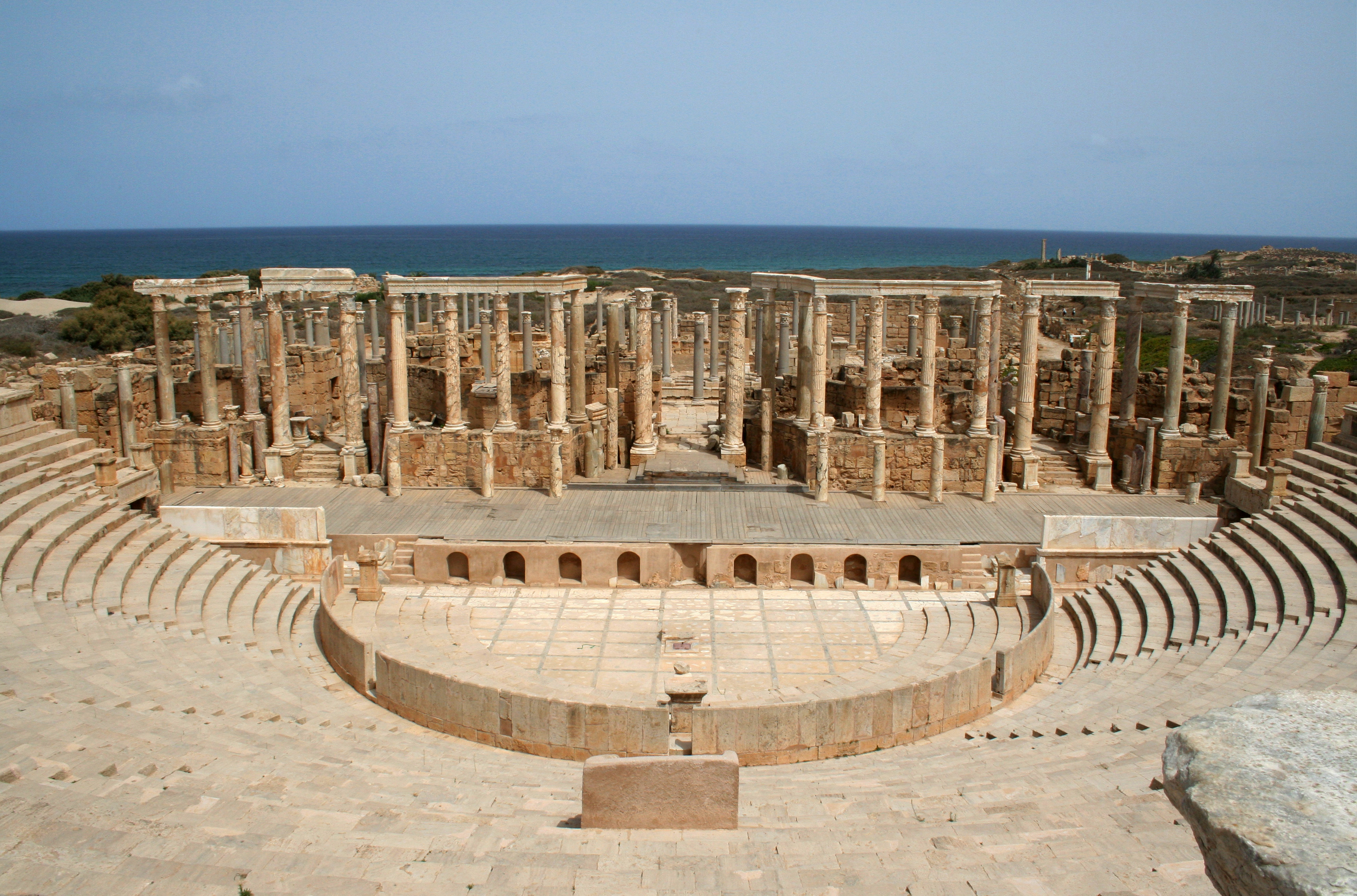
Leptis Magna in the east of Khums

Leptis Magna remained as such until the reign of the Roman emperor Tiberius, when the city and the surrounding area were formally incorporated into the empire as part of the province of Africa. It soon became one of the leading cities of Roman Africa and a major trading post.

Leptis achieved its greatest prominence beginning in 193 CE, when the ethnically Punic Lucius Septimius Severus became emperor. He favored his hometown above all other provincial cities, and the buildings and wealth he lavished on it made Leptis Magna the third-most important city in Africa, rivaling Carthage and Alexandria. In 205 CE, he and the imperial family visited the city and received great honors.

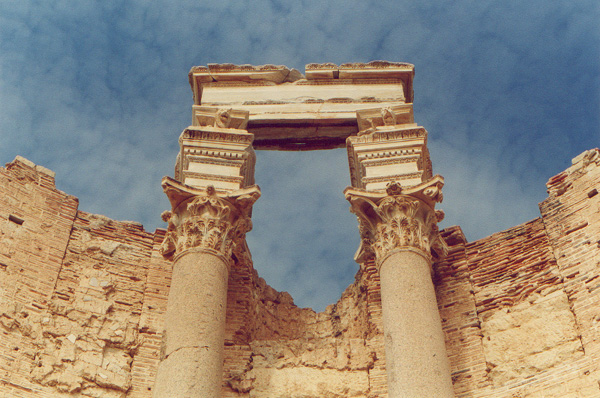
Severan Basilica

Among the changes that Severus introduced were to create a magnificent new forum and to rebuild the docks. The natural harbour had a tendency to silt up, but the Severan changes made this worse, and the eastern wharves are extremely well preserved, since they were scarcely used.

Leptis over-extended itself at this period. During the Crisis of the 3rd Century, when trade declined precipitously, Leptis Magna's importance also fell into a decline, and by the middle of the 4th century, even before it was completely devastated by the 365 tsunami, large parts of the city had been abandoned. Ammianus Marcellinus recounts that the crisis was worsened by a corrupt Roman governor named Romanus during a major tribal raid who demanded bribes to protect the city. The ruined city could not pay these and complained to the emperor Valentinian. Romanus then bribed people at court and arranged for the Leptan envoys to be punished "for bringing false accusations". It enjoyed a minor renaissance beginning in the reign of the emperor Theodosius I.

In 439 CE, Leptis Magna and the rest of the cities of Tripolitania fell under the control of the Vandals when their king, Gaiseric, captured Carthage from the Romans and made it his capital. Unfortunately for the future of Leptis Magna, Gaiseric ordered the city's walls demolished so as to dissuade its people from rebelling against Vandal rule. The people of Leptis and the Vandals both paid a heavy price for this in 523 CE when a group of Berber raiders sacked the city.

Belisarius recaptured Leptis Magna in the name of Rome ten years later, and in 534 CE, he destroyed the kingdom of the Vandals. Leptis became a provincial capital of the Eastern Roman Empire (see Byzantine Empire) but never recovered from the destruction wreaked upon it by the Berbers. It was the site of a massacre of Berber chiefs of the Leuathae tribal confederation by the Roman authorities in 543 CE. Historian Theodore Mommsen wrote that under Byzantine rule the city was fully Christian. During the decade 565-578 CE Christian missionaries from Leptis Magna even began to move once more among the Amazigh tribes as far south as the Fezzan in the Libyan desert and converted the Garamantes. But the city's decline - linked even to the Sahara's desertification - continued, even though new churches were built, and by the time of the Arab conquest of Tripolitania in the 650s, the city was nearly abandoned except for a Byzantine garrison force.

The progressive growth of arid land around Leptis reduced its importance and the port was blocked by the accumulation of sand. As a consequence, when Arabs arrived around 640 CE and later conquered Leptis, they found only a little garrison and a small city of less than 1,000 inhabitants. Due to further decline, Leptis disappeared: by the 10th century the city was forgotten and fully covered by sand.

=== Islamic rule ===
Leptis Magna and Tripolitania were conquered by Amr ibn al-Aas and soon after that, a lot of Arabs settled in the city near the ruins of Leptis Magna while most of the native Berber tribes living there converted to Islam.

For the next few centuries the control of the city shifted between Rashidun Caliphate, Umayyad Caliphate, Abbasid Caliphate, Fatimid Caliphate, Zirids, Kingdom of Africa, Almohad Caliphate and Hafsids before falling under the control of the Ottomans in the 1550s.

The city became the capital of The Fifth Sanjak (which included the cities of Misurata, Sirte, Zliten, Bani Walid and Msalata), an administrative division of Ottoman Tripolitania until World War I and the defeat and dissolution of the Ottoman Empire.

=== Italian Libya ===
"Murqub Martyrs Monument" in Khums

The Italians colonized Libya in 1911, and on 10 October of the same year a major battle between natives and Italian Army occurred in Murqub Castle in Khums and another on in the same place on 27 February 1912. Both battles named Battle of Murqub are considered as two of the most important battles during the Italian colonizing of Libya. Muammar Gaddafi later claimed that his grandfather died in one of the two battle. Libya remained under Italian rule until World War II.

During World War II Khums was occupied by the Allies and from 1942 until 1951, when Libya gained independence, Tripolitania and the region of Cyrenaica were administered by the British Military Administration. Italy formally renounced its claim upon the territory in 1947.

=== Libyan Independence and Gaddafi regime ===
Bashir Saadawi, born in Khums, was one of the major figures who contributed to Libyan independence. He was the founder of the National Congress Party which supported a Republic instead of a Monarchy. When King Idris I was crowned as King of Libya, all political parties were disbanded and Saadawi was exiled to Beirut where he remained until his death on 17 January 1957.

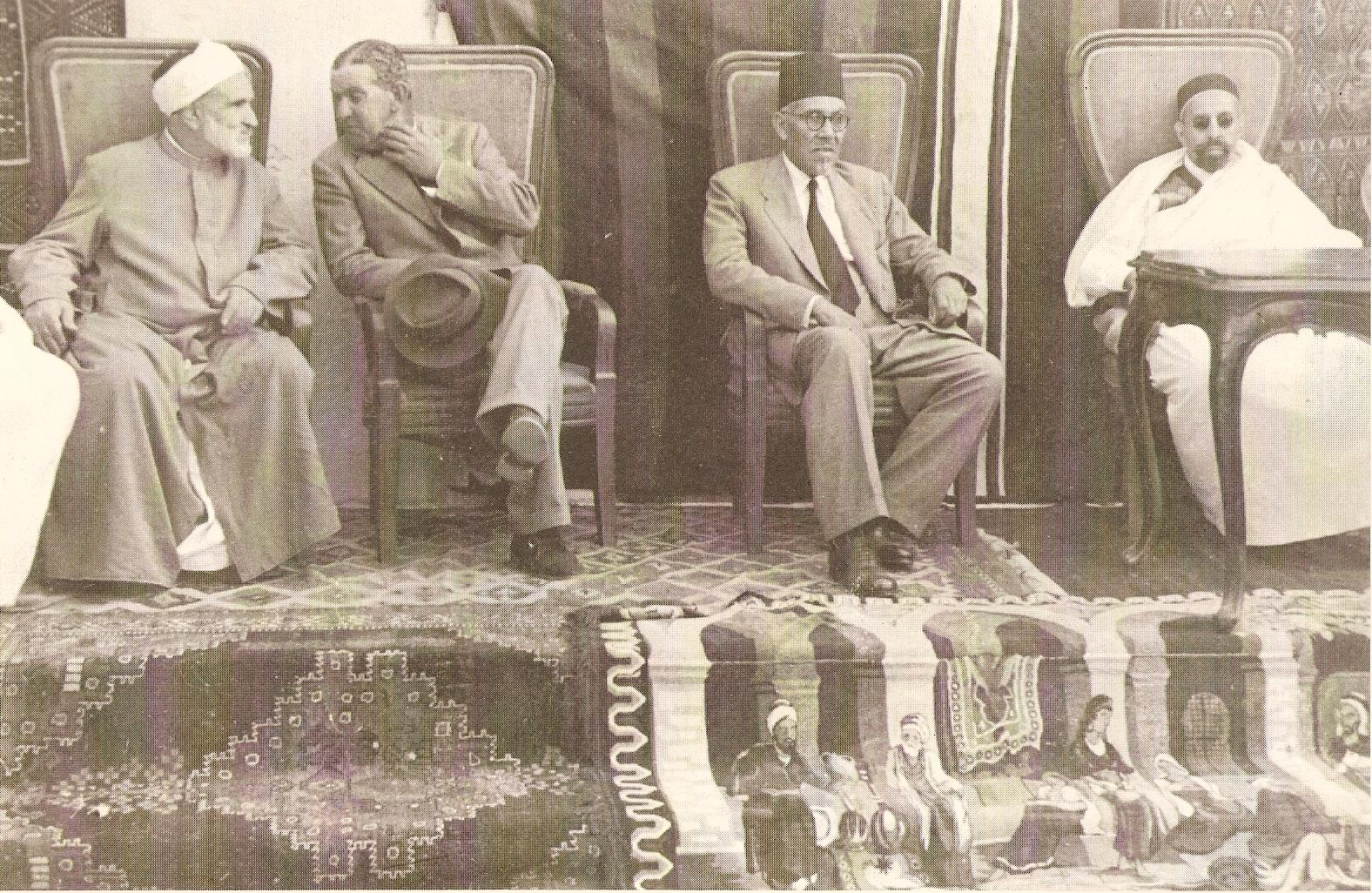
Bashir Saadawi (second right) along with King Idris (Far Right).

Khums remained part of Tripolitania province until 1962 when the Federal system canceled and replaced by Muhafazah governorates system (muhafazah) system, and this system remained even after the 1969 coup d'état and through the Libyan Arab Republic, until superseded by the 1983 Baladiyat districts system. The baladiyat system was itself dropped in 1995 and replaced by thirteen districts named shabiyat. Despite the changes, Khums remained as a separate district under the name of al-Khums or Murqub.

=== Libyan Civil War ===
Khums remained under control of Gaddafi forces through most of the war until rebels from Misrata entered and captured the city on 23 August before moving on to Tripoli.

== Climate ==
Al-Khums has a hot desert climate (Köppen climate classification BWh).

Climate data for Al-Khums, Libya (1996–2008)
Month	Jan	Feb	Mar	Apr	May	Jun	Jul	Aug	Sep	Oct	Nov	Dec	Year
Mean daily maximum °C (°F)	17.9 (64.2)	18.7 (65.7)	21.4 (70.5)	24.0 (75.2)	27.1 (80.8)	29.6 (85.3)	31.7 (89.1)	32.0 (89.6)	30.9 (87.6)	29.0 (84.2)	24.2 (75.6)	19.4 (66.9)	25.5 (77.9)
Daily mean °C (°F)	13.5 (56.3)	14.0 (57.2)	16.6 (61.9)	18.8 (65.8)	22.4 (72.3)	24.6 (76.3)	26.9 (80.4)	27.5 (81.5)	26.5 (79.7)	23.9 (75.0)	19.2 (66.6)	15.0 (59.0)	20.7 (69.3)
Mean daily minimum °C (°F)	9.3 (48.7)	9.4 (48.9)	11.5 (52.7)	13.6 (56.5)	16.9 (62.4)	19.3 (66.7)	22.3 (72.1)	22.9 (73.2)	21.9 (71.4)	19.3 (66.7)	14.6 (58.3)	10.2 (50.4)	15.9 (60.6)
Average precipitation days (≥ 0.1 mm)	6.0	4.0	2.8	1.0	0.4	0.6	0.0	0.4	1.6	3.1	4.8	6.4	30.9
Mean monthly sunshine hours	179.8	200.6	257.3	240.0	310.0	330.0	378.2	337.9	276.0	238.7	219.0	179.8	3,147.3
Mean daily sunshine hours	5.8	7.1	8.3	8.0	10.0	11.0	12.2	10.9	9.2	7.7	7.3	5.8	8.6
Source: Deutscher Wetterdienst

== Al-Khums municipality ==
Al-Khums municipality was once part of Murqub District and its capital, since 2013 the 22 Shabiya divided into 90 Municipalities; and so al-Khums was separated from Zliten.

As of 2019, al-Khums Municipality consists of some small towns on the outskirts of al-Khums Centre, including Lebda, Al-jahawat, Seleen, El-Sahel and Suuq El-Khamis.

== Sport ==
The city's main football club is al-Khums SC which currently plays in Libyan Premier League.

== Notable people ==
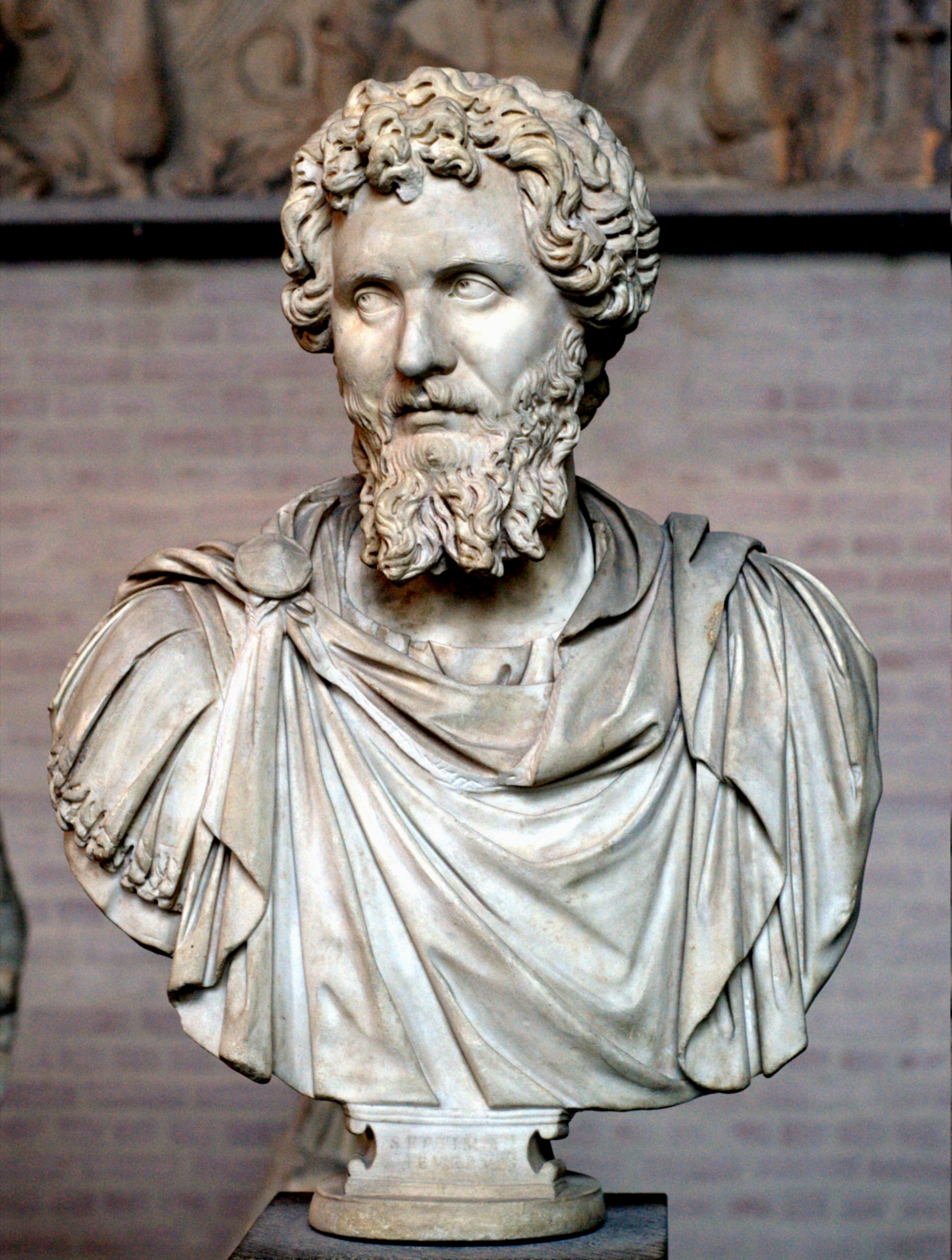
Septimius Severus at Glyptothek, Munich.

- Emperor Septimius Severus: The 21st Emperor of the Roman Empire was born in Leptis Magna. He was the founder of the Severan dynasty, the last dynasty of the empire before the Crisis of the Third Century.
- Pope Victor I: was Bishop of Rome, and hence a pope, in the late second century. He was of Berber origin.
- Bashir Saadawi: A major figure in Libya independence.
- Idi Amin: Lived in a hotel in the city a year between 1979 and 1980 after his exile from Uganda in the end of the Uganda–Tanzania War.
- Salem Al Rewani: A former Libyan international player and Al-Ittihad legend.
- Mario Schifano: Italian Pop artist.
- Mohamed Hassan: Libyan musician famous throughout North Africa.

== Port and transport ==
Al-Khums has a small port for bulk carriers, containers and car carriers. It has an entrance channel of depth 13 metres and an anchorage with a depth 10 meters. The port itself consists of nine medium-sized berths (numbers 12 to 19) with lengths ranging from 75 to 530 meters and maximum drafts ranging from 8 to 12 meters depending on the berth.

In June 2018, the container ship Maersk Alexander rescued 113 refugees in the Mediterranean sea during her voyage en route from al-Khums to Malta. The ship had been directed to do so by the maritime rescue coordination centre in Rome after a distress message was received from the boat with 113 refugees. After an initial refusal of permission to berth at Sicily, the refugees were subsequently disembarked at the Italian port of Pozallo.

== See also ==
- List of cities in Libya
- Railway stations in Libya - proposed
