= High Council of State (Libya) =

Libyan advisory body formed in 2015

High Council of State المجلس الأعلى للدولة

History
- Founded: 5 April 2016
- Preceded by: General National Congress

Leadership
- Chairman: Mohammed Takala
- First Deputy Chairman: Naji Mukhtar
- Second Deputy Chairman: Omar Dabushah

Structure
- Seats: 145
- Political groups: Members of the GNC appointed after 2014 (134); Members of the GNC elected in 2012 (11)

Meeting place
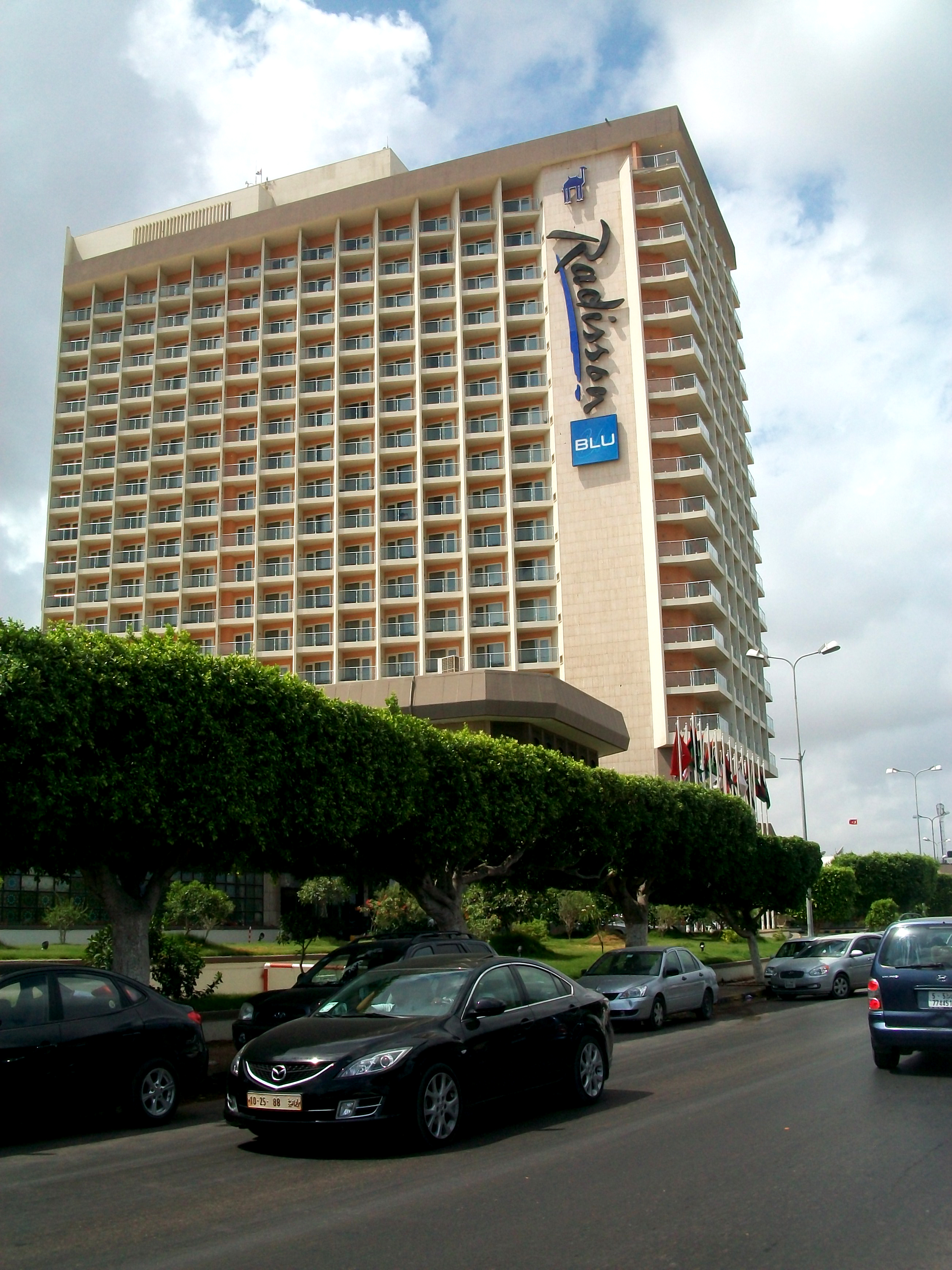
- Radisson Blu Al Mahary Hotel; Tripoli, Libya

The High Council of State (Arabic: المجلس الأعلى للدولة, al majlis al'aelaa lildawla) is an advisory body for Libya formed under the terms of the Libyan Political Agreement which was signed on 17 December 2015. The agreement resulted from United Nations supported peace talks and has been unanimously endorsed by the Security Council. The High Council of State is able to advise the interim Government of National Unity (GNA, previously, the Government of National Accord) and the House of Representatives (HoR), currently based in Tobruk, and can express a binding opinion on these bodies under certain circumstances. The members of the council were nominated by remaining members of the General National Congress who in 2014 were not elected to the HoR.

== History ==
The council met for the first time on 27 February 2016 and it was formally established at a ceremony at the Radisson Blu Al Mahary Hotel in Tripoli on 5 April 2016.

The council moved into the headquarters of the former General National Congress, at the Rixos Al Nasr Convention Centre, on 22 April 2016.

On 31 August 2016, a 94-member rival High Council of State was proclaimed in Benghazi and its members wanted to join the official body.

On 21 September 2016, the High Council of State took legislative powers.

On 10 October 2016, the Rixos Al Nasr Convention Centre was attacked by gunmen loyal to the GNC. On 15 October 2016, forces loyal to the GNC took over the building and announced the return of the Ghawil cabinet. Then, fighting occurred between Sarraj loyalists and Ghawil forces. Following these clashes, the council once again took up residence in the Radisson Blu Al Mahary Hotel.

== Chairman of the High Council ==
Incumbent	Since	Until	Party
Abdulrahman Sewehli	6 April 2016	8 April 2018	Union for Homeland
Khalid al-Mishri	8 April 2018	6 August 2023	Justice and Construction Party
Mohammed Takala	6 August 2023		Independent

Saleh al-Makhzoum served as the first deputy chairman and Muhammed Imazzeb served as second deputy chairman under Sewehli. They were replaced by Naji Mukhtar and Fawzi Aqab, respectively, during the tenure of al-Mishri.

In August 2023, Mohammed Takala replaced al-Mishri.

== See also ==
- Presidential Council (Libya)
- Government of National Accord
- House of Representatives (Libya)
