= Politics of Libya under Muammar Gaddafi =

From 1969 to 2011, the politics of Libya were determined de facto by Muammar Gaddafi, who had been in power since his overthrow of the Kingdom of Libya in 1969.

Gaddafi abolished the post-1951 Libyan Constitution and introduced his own political philosophy, based on his Green Book published in the 1970s. Gaddafi's system was known as Jamahiriya and was notionally legally based on the legislative General People's Congress (GPC), consisting of 2,700 representatives of Basic People's Congresses, and the executive General People's Committee, headed by a General Secretary.

An essential part of Gaddafi’s political philosophy can be summed up in this excerpt from The Green Book:

“A parliament is originally founded to represent the people, but this in itself is undemocratic as democracy means the authority of the people and not an authority acting on their behalf. The mere existence of a parliament means the absence of the people. True democracy exists only through the direct participation of the people, and not through the activity of their representatives.”

The Jamahiriya Sector was overseen by the Revolutionary Sector. This was headed by Muammar Gaddafi as "Brotherly Leader of the Revolution", the Revolutionary Committees, and the surviving members of the 12-person Revolutionary Command Council established in 1969. This "revolutionary sector" held office by virtue of having led the revolution and therefore was not subject to election. As a consequence, although Gaddafi held no governmental post after 1980, he maintained absolute control over the country until the collapse of his regime during the Libyan Civil War.

== History of Libyan politics under Gaddafi ==
For the first seven years following the 1969 revolution, Colonel Gaddafi and 12 fellow army officers, the Revolutionary Command Council, began a complete overhaul of Libya's political system, society, and economy. On 2 March 1977, Gaddafi convened a General People's Congress (GPC) to proclaim the establishment of "people's power," change the country's name to the Socialist People's Libyan Arab Jamahiriya, and to vest, theoretically, primary authority in the GPC.

Gaddafi remained the de facto chief of state and secretary general of the GPC until 1980, when he gave up his office. He continued to control all aspects of the Libyan government through direct appeals to the masses, a pervasive security apparatus, and powerful revolutionary committees. Although he held no formal office, Gaddafi exercised absolute power with the assistance of a small group of trusted advisers, who included relatives from his home base in the Sirte region, which lies between the rival provinces of Tripolitania and Cyrenaica.

During his rule, Gaddafi took increasing control of the government, but he also attempted to achieve greater popular participation in local government. In 1973, he announced the start of a "people's revolution" in schools, businesses, industries, and public institutions to oversee administration of those organizations in the public interest. The March 1977 establishment of "people's power" —with mandatory popular participation in the selection of representatives to the GPC— was the culmination of this process.

In the 1980s, competition grew between the official Libyan Government and military hierarchies and the revolutionary committees. An abortive coup attempt in May 1984 apparently mounted by Libyan exiles with internal support, led to a short-lived reign of terror in which thousands were imprisoned and interrogated. An unknown number were executed. Gaddafi used the revolutionary committees to search out alleged internal opponents following the coup attempt, thereby accelerating the rise of more radical elements inside the Libyan power hierarchy.

After the 1986 bombing of Libya by the United States Air Force, Gaddafi decreed that the word "Great" (Arabic: "al Uzma") should be appended to the beginning of the name, rendering its official name Al Jumahiriyah al Arabiyah al Libiyah ash Shabiyah al Ishtirakiyah al Uzma, or Great Socialist People's Libyan Arab Jamahiriya.

In 1988, faced with rising public dissatisfaction with shortages in consumer goods and setbacks in Libya's war with Chad, Gaddafi began to curb the power of the revolutionary committees and to institute some domestic reforms. The regime released many political prisoners and eased restrictions on foreign travel by Libyans. Private businesses were again permitted to operate.

Around the same time, Gaddafi began to pursue an anti-fundamentalist Islamic policy domestically, viewing fundamentalism as a potential rallying point for opponents of the regime. Ministerial positions and military commanders were frequently shuffled or placed under temporary house arrest to diffuse potential threats to Gaddafi's authority.

Despite these measures, internal dissent continued. Gaddafi's security forces launched a preemptive strike at alleged coup plotters in the military and among the Warfalla tribe in October 1993. Widespread arrests and government reshufflings followed, accompanied by public "confessions" from regime opponents and allegations of torture and executions. The military, once Gaddafi's strongest supporters, became a potential threat in the 1990s. In 1993, following a failed coup attempt that implicated senior military officers, Gaddafi began to purge the military periodically, eliminating potential rivals and inserting his own loyal followers in their place.

== Political sectors under Gaddafi ==
=== Revolutionary sector ===
Organs of a military junta were first put into place in 1969. These organs were never dissolved throughout the period of Gaddafi's rule, though after the proclamation of the Jamahiriya, they were reorganized. The "revolutionary sector" of Gaddafi's Jamahiriya was officially under the control of "Brotherly Leader and Guide of the Revolution" Muammar Gaddafi after 1979.

Beginning in 1977, Gaddafi had introduced "revolutionary committees" assigned the task of "absolute revolutionary supervision of people's power"; that is, they were to guide the people's committees and "raise the general level of political consciousness and devotion to revolutionary ideals". Reportedly 10 to 20 percent of Libyans worked in surveillance for these committees, a proportion of informants on par with Saddam Hussein's Iraq or Kim Jong Il's North Korea.

==== Prominent members ====
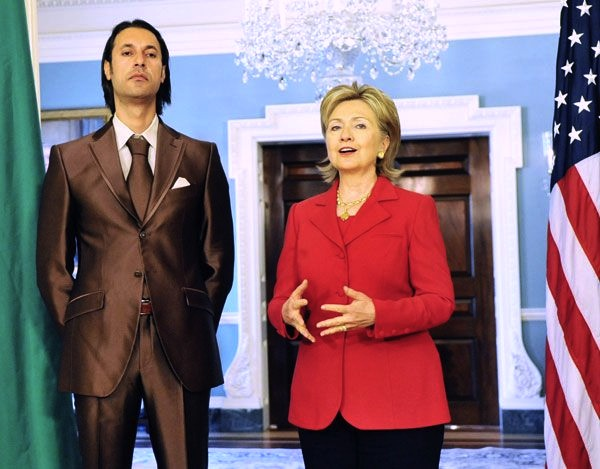
Mutassim Gaddafi with U.S. Secretary of State Hillary Clinton in 2009.

Until the Libyan Civil War, General Abdul Fatah Younis may have been second to Gaddafi in the government hierarchy and was also Interior Minister. He resigned on 22 February 2011.

On 1 March 2011, Quryna reported Gaddafi sacked his right-hand man, information chief Abdullah Senussi, who was responsible for the brutality against the protestors.

Interpol on 4 March 2011 issued a security alert concerning the "possible movement of dangerous individuals and assets" based on the United Nations Security Council Resolution 1970 (travel bans and assets freeze). The warning lists Gaddafi himself and 15 key members of his regime:

1. Muammar Gaddafi: Responsibility for ordering repression of demonstrations, human rights abuses.
2. Dr. Baghdadi Mahmudi: Head of the Liaison Office of the Revolutionary Committees. Revolutionary Committees involved in violence against demonstrators.
3. Abuzed Omar Dorda: Director, External Security Organization. Regime loyalist. Head of external intelligence agency.
4. Major-General Abu-Bakr Yunis Jabr: Defense Minister. Overall responsibility for actions of Armed forces.
5. Ayesha Gaddafi: Daughter of Muammar Gaddafi. Closeness of association with regime.
6. Hannibal Muammar Gaddafi: Son of Muammar Gaddafi. Closeness of association with regime.
7. Mutassim Gaddafi: National Security Adviser. Son of Muammar Gaddafi. Closeness of association with regime.
8. Al-Saadi Gaddafi: Commander Special Forces. Son of Muammar Gaddafi. Closeness of association with regime. Command of military units involved in repression of demonstrations.
9. Saif al-Islam Gaddafi: Director, Gaddafi Foundation. Son of Muammar Gaddafi. Closeness of association with regime. Inflammatory public statements encouraging violence against demonstrators.
10. Abdulqader Yusef Dibri: Head of Muammar Gaddafi's personal security. Responsibility for regime security. History of directing violence against dissidents.
11. Matuq Mohammed Matuq: Secretary for Utilities. Senior member of regime. Involvement with Revolutionary Committees. Past history of involvement in suppression of dissent and violence.
12. Sayyid Mohammed Qadhaf Al-dam: Cousin of Muammar Gaddafi. In the 1980s, Sayyid was involved in the dissident assassination campaign and allegedly responsible for several deaths in Europe. He is also thought to have been involved in arms procurement.
13. Khamis Gaddafi: Son of Muammar Gaddafi. Closeness of association with regime. Command of military units involved in repression of demonstrations.
14. Muhammad Gaddafi: Son of Muammar Gaddafi. Closeness of association with regime.
15. Saif al-Arab Gaddafi: Son of Muammar Gaddafi. Closeness of association with regime.
16. Colonel Abdullah Senussi: Director Military Intelligence. Military Intelligence involvement in suppression of demonstrations. Past history includes suspicion of involvement in Abu Sulim prison massacre. Convicted in absentia for bombing of UTA flight. Brother-in-law of Muammar Gaddafi.

=== Jamahiriya sector ===
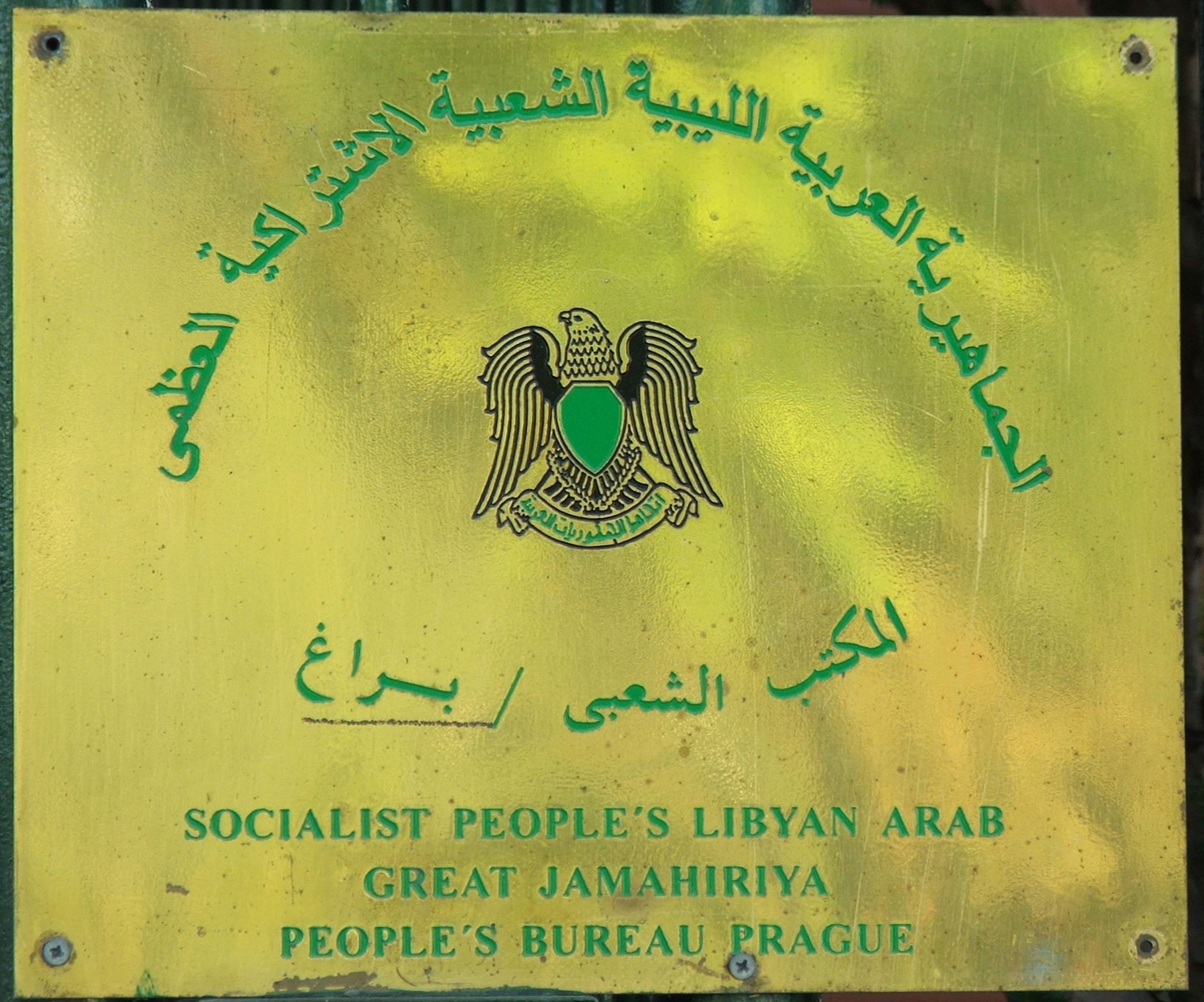
Plaque denoting the "Peoples' Bureau" (Embassy) of "Socialist People's Libyan Arab Great Jamahiriya" in Prague.

The term Jamahiriya (Arabic: جماهيرية jamāhīriyyah) is generally translated as "state of the masses". It is intended to describe a state following the political philosophy expounded by Gaddafi in his Green Book. The term does not occur in this sense in Gaddafi's Green Book itself, although the text does dwell on the concept of the "masses" (Arabic: جماهير).

The concept was presented as the materialization of the Third International Theory, proposed by Gaddafi to be applied to the entire Third World. The term in practice has only been applied to the Libyan state, of which Gaddafi was the Caid (translated Leader; strict transliteration Qāʾid). Although Gaddafi no longer held public office or title after 1980, he was accorded the honorifics "Guide of the First of September Great Revolution of the Socialist People's Libyan Arab Jamahiriya" or "Brotherly Leader and Guide of the Revolution" in government statements and the official press.

The government of the Great Socialist People's Libyan Arab Jamahiriya declared Libya a direct democracy without political parties, governed by its populace through local popular councils and communes (named Basic People's Congresses).

Making up the legislative branch of government, this sector comprised Local People's Congresses in each of the 1,500 urban wards, 32 Sha’biyat People's Congresses for the regions, and the National General People's Congress. These legislative bodies were represented by corresponding executive bodies (Local People's Committees, Sha'biyat People's Committees and the National General People's Committee/Cabinet).

Every four years the membership of the Local People's Congresses elected by acclamation both their own leadership and secretaries for the People's Committees, sometimes after many debates and a critical vote. The leadership of the Local People's Congress represented the local congress at the People's Congress of the next level and has an imperative mandate. The members of the National General People's Congress elected the members of the National General People's Committee (the Cabinet) by acclamation at their annual meeting.

While there was discussion regarding who would run for executive offices, only those approved by the revolutionary leadership were actually elected. The government administration was effective as long as it operated within the directives of the revolutionary leadership. The revolutionary leadership had absolute veto power despite the constitutionally established people's democracy and alleged rule of the people. The government controlled both state-run and semi-autonomous media, and any articles critical of current policies were requested and intentionally placed by the revolutionary leadership itself, for example, as a means of initiating reforms. In cases involving a violation of "these taboos", the private press, like The Tripoli Post, was censored.

There was no separate defense ministry in Gaddafi's Libya; all defense activities are centralized under the presidency. Arms production was limited, due to extensive imports from the Soviet Union, and manufacturers were state-owned.

==== Legislative branch ====
The General People's Congress (Mu'tammar al-sha'ab al 'âmm) consisted of 2,700 indirectly elected representatives of the Basis People's Congresses. The GPC was the legislative forum that interacted with the General People's Committee, whose members were secretaries of Libyan ministries. It served as the intermediary between the masses and the leadership and was composed of the secretariats of some 600 local "basic popular congresses."

The GPC secretariat and the cabinet secretaries were appointed by the GPC secretary general and confirmed by the annual GPC congress. These cabinet secretaries were responsible for the routine operation of their ministries.

==== Judicial system ====
The Libyan court system consisted of four levels: summary courts, which try petty offenses, the courts of first instance, which tried more serious crimes; the courts of appeals, and the Supreme Court, which was the final appellate level. The GPC appointed justices to the Supreme Court. Special "revolutionary courts" and military courts operated outside the court system to try political offenses and crimes against the state.

When Muammar Gaddafi came to power in the Libyan Revolution, he promised to reinstate sharia law and abrogate imported laws which contradicted Islamic values. Initially, all old laws remained in effect, except for ones contravening the new constitution. In 1973, Gaddafi suspended all legislation, stating that sharia would be the law of the land, Gaddafi's sharia was based only in the quran and not in a classical Muslim legalistic source of fiqh. The dual-court system was also abolished that year, replaced by a single court system which aimed to bring together Islamic and secular principles. However, by 1974, progress in the Islamicisation of the law had come to a halt.

In 1977, the Libyan government promulgated the Declaration of People's Power, which superseded the constitution; this also stated that the Qur'an was the source of legislation for Libya. However, throughout the late 1970s and 1980s, Gaddafi repeatedly emphasised in speeches that Islamic law was an insufficient basis for modern economic and social relations, and that the traditional Islamic guidelines for property and commerce had no legal standing. In practise, secular policies overrode religion as a source of law.

=== Political parties and elections ===
Political parties were banned by the Prohibition of Party Politics Act Number 71 of 1972, including Hizb ut-Tahrir. The establishment of non-governmental organizations (NGOs) was allowed under the Association Act of 1971. As they are required to conform to the goals of the revolution, however, the number of NGOs in Libya was small in comparison with neighboring countries. Unions did not exist as such. However, the numerous professional associations were integrated into the state structure as a third pillar, along with the People's Congresses and Committees, though they did not have the right to strike. Professional associations sent delegates to the General People's Congress, where they had a representative mandate.

The General People's Congress (Mu'tammar al-sha'ab al 'âmm) consisted out of circa 2700 representatives of the Basis People's Congresses.

Before Gaddafi's coup, general elections were held in the 1950s and 1960s. Although political parties contested the 1952 elections, they were subsequently banned, and all other elections were carried out on a non-partisan basis.
