= History of Libya under Muammar Gaddafi =

The green flag of the Great Socialist People's Libyan Arab Jamahiriya. The colour green represented Islam and Gaddafi's Third International Theory, which was outlined in The Green Book.

The Arab Liberation Flag used under the Federation of Arab Republics was based on the flag first used by Gamal Abdel Nasser and used by Gaddafi's regime prior to the Jamahiriya.

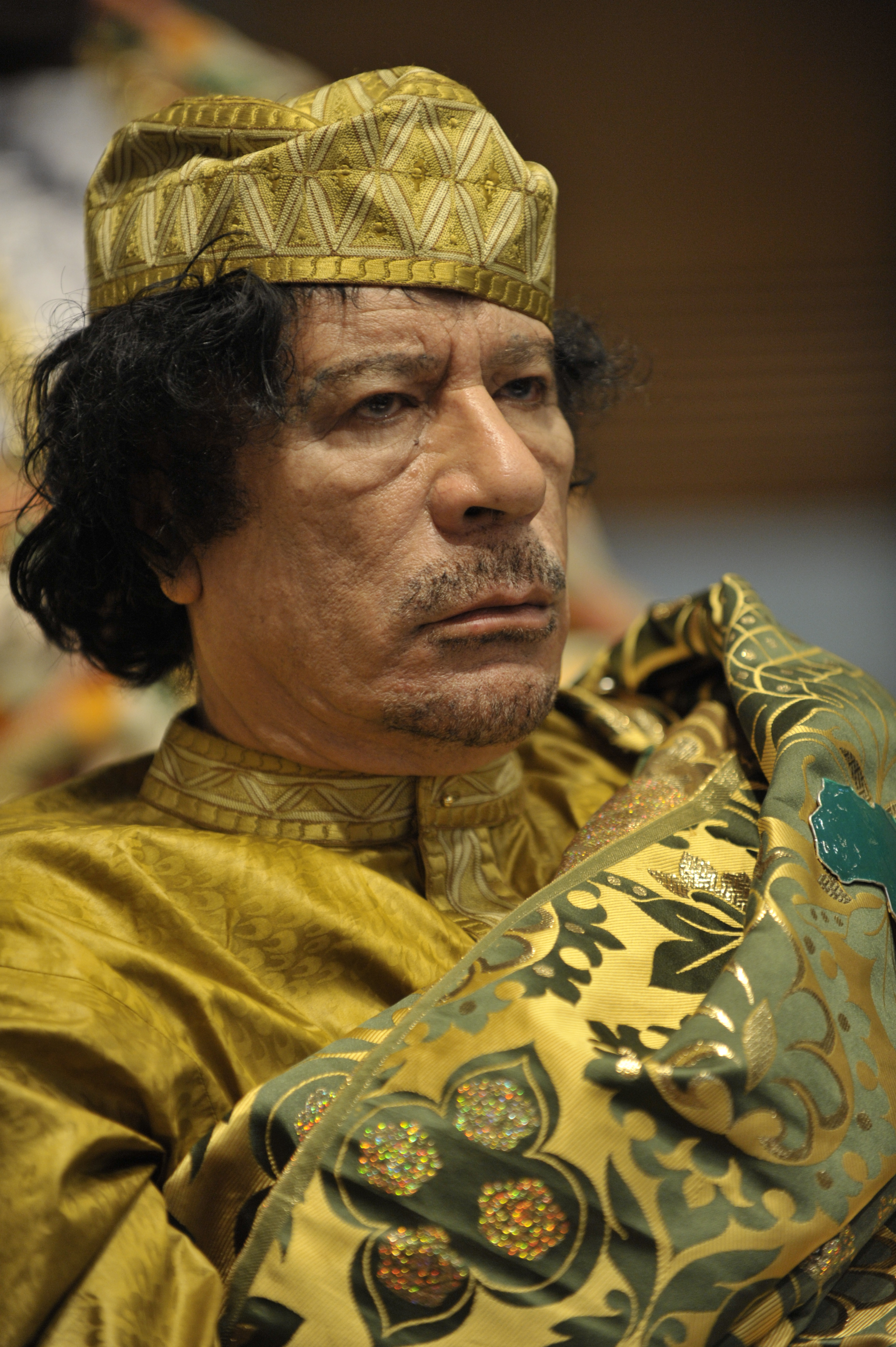
Gaddafi at the African Union Summit, Addis Ababa, 2 February 2009

Muammar Gaddafi became the de facto leader of Libya on 1 September 1969 after leading a group of Libyan Army officers against King Idris I in a bloodless coup d'état. When Idris was in Turkey for medical treatment, the Revolutionary Command Council (RCC) headed by Gaddafi abolished the monarchy and the constitution and established the Libyan Arab Republic, with the Ba'athist motto "Unity, Freedom, Socialism".

After coming to power, with the 1973 oil crisis and consequential rise of the Libyan economy, the RCC government initiated a process of directing funds toward providing education, health care and housing for all. Public education in the country became free and primary education compulsory for both sexes. Providing housing for all was a task the RCC government was unable to complete. Under Gaddafi, per capita income in the country rose to more than US$11,000 in nominal terms, and to over US$30,000 in PPP terms, the 5th highest in Africa. The increase in prosperity was accompanied by a foreign policy hostile to the other Arab states of the region, an anti-West foreign policy, and increased domestic political repression. Gaddafi ruled the country in an authoritarian manner and was described as a dictator.

During the 1980s and 1990s, Gaddafi, openly supported foreign groups like the African National Congress, the Palestine Liberation Organization, the Provisional Irish Republican Army, Polisario Front and Moro National Liberation Front as well as militants such as Charles Taylor, Foday Sankoh, Abu Nidal and leaders across Africa such as Idi Amin, Jean-Bédel Bokassa and Mengistu Haile Mariam. In the Middle East, he formed alliances with what the US then referred to as the "Radical camp", composed of Ba'athist Syria, Iran and South Yemen. Gaddafi's government was often suspected of participating or aiding attacks by terrorist groups. Additionally, Gaddafi undertook several invasions of neighboring states in Africa, notably Chad in the 1970s and 1980s. All of his actions led to a deterioration of Libya's foreign relations with several countries, mostly Western states and the Arab world, and culminated in the 1986 United States bombing of Libya as well as the support of Ba'athist Iraq, Egypt, Saudi Arabia, Morocco and Sudan towards Chad against Gaddafi. Gaddafi defended his government's actions by citing the need to support anti-imperialist and anti-colonial movements around the world. Gaddafi's behavior was often erratic and led some (from the West, as well as from the Arab world) to conclude that he was not mentally sound, a claim disputed by his regime. Despite this, his actions have often led to interrogations. François Mitterrand called him an "unstable man", Ronald Reagan dubbed him the "mad dog of the Middle East" and for Anwar al-Sadat, he was literally a "possessed demon". Despite receiving extensive aid and technical assistance from the Soviet Union and its allies, and aligning his country with the Eastern Bloc, Gaddafi retained ties to some pro-American governments in Western Europe, largely by courting Western oil companies with promises of access to the lucrative Libyan energy sector. After the 9/11 attacks, strained relations between Libya and NATO countries were mostly normalised, and sanctions against the country relaxed, in exchange for nuclear disarmament.

In early 2011, a civil war broke out in the context of the wider Arab Spring. The rebel anti-Gaddafi forces formed a committee named the National Transitional Council in February 2011, to act as an interim authority in the rebel-controlled areas. After killings by government forces in addition to those by the rebel forces, a multinational coalition led by NATO forces intervened in March in support of the rebels. The International Criminal Court issued an arrest warrant against Gaddafi and his entourage in June 2011. Gaddafi's government was overthrown in the wake of the fall of Tripoli to the rebel forces in August, although pockets of resistance held by forces in support of Gaddafi's government held out for another two months, especially in Gaddafi's hometown of Sirte, which he declared the new capital of Libya in September. The fall of the last remaining sites in Sirte under pro-Gaddafi control on 20 October 2011, followed by the killing of Gaddafi, marked the end of the Libyan Arab Jamahiriya.

The name of Libya was changed several times during Gaddafi's tenure as leader. From its founding in 1969 to 1977, the name was the Libyan Arab Republic. In 1977, the name was changed to Socialist People's Libyan Arab Jamahiriya. Jamahiriya was a term coined by Gaddafi, usually translated as "state of the masses". The country was renamed again in 1986 as the Great Socialist People's Libyan Arab Jamahiriya, after the United States bombing that year.

== Libyan Arab Republic (1969–1977) ==
Libyan Arab Republic ٱلْجُمْهُورِيَّةُ ٱلْعَرَبِيَّة ٱللِّيْبِيَّة (Arabic) al-Jumhūriyya al-ʿArabiyya al-Lībiyya Repubblica Araba Libica (Italian)
- 1969–1977
- Top: Flag (1969–1972); Bottom: Flag (1972–1977) Top: Coat of arms (1969–1972); Bottom: Coat of arms (1972–1977)
- Motto: وَحْدَةٌ، حُرِّيَّةٌ، اِشْتِرَاكِيَّةٌ Waḥda, Ḥurriyya, Ishtirākiyya "Unity, Freedom, Socialism"
- Anthem: ٱللَّٰهُ أَكْبَرُ Allāhu Akbar "God Is the Greatest" وَاللَّهُ زَمَانْ يَا سِلَاحِي; Walla Zaman Ya Selahy "It has been a long time, oh my weapon!"
- Location of Libyan Arab Republic
- Capital: Tripoli
- Official languages: Arabic and Italian
- Government: Unitary (Note: Upon proclamation of a republic, it was declared that a "unitary government" would lead Libya.) one-party (Note: The Arab Socialist Union was established as the sole legal party in 1971 as a successor of the Free Officers Movement) socialist republic
- Chairman of the Revolutionary Command Council (head of state)
  - 1969–1977: Muammar Gaddafi
- Prime Minister
  - 1969–1970 (first): Mahmud Suleiman Maghribi
  - 1972–1977 (last): Abdessalam Jalloud
- Historical era: Cold War and Arab Cold War
  - Coup d'état: 1 September 1969
  - Jamahiriya established: 2 March 1977

Population
  - 1977: 2,681,900
- Currency: Libyan dinar (LYD)
- Calling code: 218
- ISO 3166 code: LY
Preceded by	Succeeded by
Kingdom of Libya	Great Socialist People's Libyan Arab Jamahiriya
- Today part of: Libya

=== Coup d'état of 1969 ===
The discovery of significant oil reserves in 1959 and the subsequent income from petroleum sales enabled the Kingdom of Libya to transition from one of the world's poorest nations to a wealthy state. Although oil drastically improved the Libyan government's finances, resentment began to build over the increased concentration of the nation's wealth in the hands of King Idris. This discontent mounted with the rise of Nasserism and Arab nationalism/socialism throughout North Africa and the Middle East.

On 1 September 1969, a group of about 70 young army officers known as the Free Officers Movement and enlisted men mostly assigned to the Signal Corps, seized control of the government and in a stroke abolished the Libyan monarchy. The coup was launched at Benghazi, and within two hours the takeover was completed. Army units quickly rallied in support of the coup, and within a few days firmly established military control in Tripoli and throughout the country. Popular reception of the coup, especially by younger people in the urban areas, was enthusiastic. Fears of resistance in Cyrenaica and Fezzan proved unfounded. No deaths or violent incidents related to the coup were reported.

The Free Officers Movement, which claimed credit for carrying out the coup, was headed by a twelve-member directorate that designated itself the Revolutionary Command Council (RCC). This body constituted the Libyan government after the coup. In its initial proclamation on 1 September, the RCC declared the country to be a free and sovereign state called the Libyan Arab Republic, which would proceed "in the path of freedom, unity, and social justice, guaranteeing the right of equality to its citizens, and opening before them the doors of honorable work." The rule of the Turks and Italians and the "reactionary" government just overthrown were characterized as belonging to "dark ages", from which the Libyan people were called to move forward as "free brothers" to a new age of prosperity, equality, and honor.

The RCC advised diplomatic representatives in Libya that the revolutionary changes had not been directed from outside the country, that existing treaties and agreements would remain in effect, and that foreign lives and property would be protected. Diplomatic recognition of the new government came quickly from countries throughout the world. United States recognition was officially extended on 6 September.

==== Post-coup ====
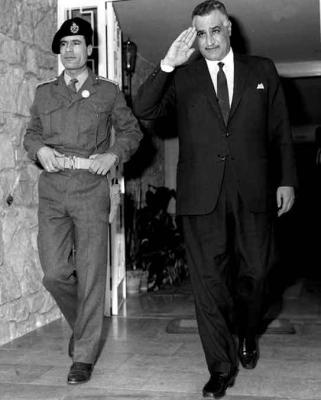
Gaddafi (left) with Egyptian President Gamal Abdel Nasser in 1969

In view of the lack of internal resistance, it appeared that the chief danger to the new government lay in the possibility of a reaction inspired by the absent King Idris or his designated heir, Crown Prince Hasan, who had been taken into custody at the time of the coup along with other senior civil and military officials of the royal government. Within days of the coup, however, Hasan publicly renounced all rights to the throne, stated his support for the new government, and called on the people to accept it without violence.

Idris, in an exchange of messages with the RCC through Egypt's President Nasser, dissociated himself from reported attempts to secure British intervention and disclaimed any intention of coming back to Libya. In return, he was assured by the RCC of the safety of his family still in the country. At his own request and with Nasser's approval, Idris took up residence once again in Egypt, where he had spent his first exile and where he remained until his death in 1983.

On 7 September 1969, the RCC announced that it had appointed a cabinet to conduct the government of the new republic. An American-educated technician, Mahmud Suleiman Maghribi, who had been imprisoned since 1967 for his political activities, was designated prime minister. He presided over the eight-member Council of Ministers, of whom six, like Maghribi, were civilians and two – Adam Said Hawwaz and Musa Ahmad – were military officers. Neither of the officers was a member of the RCC.

The Council of Ministers was instructed to "implement the state's general policy as drawn up by the RCC", leaving no doubt where ultimate authority rested. The next day the RCC decided to promote Captain Gaddafi to colonel and to appoint him commander in chief of the Libyan Armed Forces. Although RCC spokesmen declined until January 1970 to reveal any other names of RCC members, it was apparent from that date onward that the head of the RCC and new de facto head of state was Gaddafi.

Analysts were quick to point out the striking similarities between the Libyan military coup of 1969 and that in Egypt under Nasser in 1952, and it became clear that the Egyptian experience and the charismatic figure of Nasser had formed the model for the Free Officers Movement. As the RCC in the last months of 1969 moved vigorously to institute domestic reforms, it proclaimed neutrality in the confrontation between the superpowers and opposition to all forms of colonialism and imperialism. It also made clear Libya's dedication to Arab unity and to the support of the Palestinian cause against Israel.

The RCC reaffirmed the country's identity as part of the "Arab nation" and its state religion as Islam. It abolished parliamentary institutions, all legislative functions being assumed by the RCC, and continued the prohibition against political parties, in effect since 1952. The new government categorically rejected communism – in large part because it was atheist – and officially espoused an Arab interpretation of socialism that integrated Islamic principles with social, economic, and political reform. Libya had shifted, virtually overnight, from the camp of conservative Arab traditionalist states to that of the radical nationalist states.

==== Attempted counter-coups ====
Following the formation of the Libyan Arab Republic, Gaddafi and his associates insisted that their government would not rest on individual leadership, but rather on collegial decision making.

The first major cabinet change occurred soon after the first challenge to the government. In December 1969, Adam Said Hawwaz, the minister of defense, and Musa Ahmad, the minister of interior, were arrested and accused of planning a coup. In the new cabinet formed after the crisis, Gaddafi, retaining his post as chairman of the RCC, also became prime minister and defense minister.

Major Abdel Salam Jallud, generally regarded as second only to Gaddafi in the RCC, became deputy prime minister and minister of interior. This cabinet totaled thirteen members, of whom five were RCC officers. The government was challenged a second time in July 1970 when Abdullah Abid Sanusi and Ahmed al-Senussi, distant cousins of former King Idris, and members of the Sayf an Nasr clan of Fezzan were accused of plotting to seize power for themselves. After the plot was foiled, a substantial cabinet change occurred, RCC officers for the first time forming a majority among new ministers.

==== Assertion of Gaddafi's control ====
From the start, RCC spokesmen had indicated a serious intent to bring the "defunct regime" to account. In 1971 and 1972, more than 200 former government officials (including seven prime ministers and a number of cabinet ministers), as well as former King Idris and members of the royal family, were brought to the Libyan People's Court to be tried on charges of treason and corruption.

Many, who lived in exile (including Idris), were tried in absentia. Although a large percentage of those charged were acquitted, sentences of up to fifteen years in prison and heavy fines were imposed on others. Five death sentences, all but one of them in absentia, were pronounced; among them, one against Idris. Former Queen Fatima and former Crown Prince Hasan were sentenced to five and three years in prison, respectively.

Meanwhile, Gaddafi and the RCC had disbanded the Senussi order and officially downgraded its historical role in achieving Libya's independence. He also declared regional and tribal issues to be "obstructions" in the path of social advancement and Arab unity, dismissing traditional leaders and drawing administrative boundaries across tribal groupings.

The Free Officers Movement was renamed "Arab Socialist Union" (ASU) in 1971 (modeled after Egypt's Arab Socialist Union), while also becoming the sole legal party in Gaddafi's Libya. It acted as a "vehicle of national expression", purporting to "raise the political consciousness of Libyans" and to "aid the RCC in formulating public policy through debate in open forums". Trade unions were incorporated into the ASU and strikes outlawed. The press, already subject to censorship, was officially conscripted in 1972 as an agent of the revolution. Italians (and what remained of the Jewish community) were expelled from the country, their property confiscated in October 1970.

In 1972, Libya joined the Federation of Arab Republics with Egypt and Syria; the previously intended union of pan-Arabic states, never coming to fruition, went effectively dormant after 1973.

As months passed, Gaddafi, caught up in his visions of revolutionary Pan-Arabism and Islam (both locked in mortal struggle with what he termed the "encircling, demonic forces of reaction, imperialism, and Zionism"), increasingly devoted attention to international rather than internal affairs. As a result, routine administrative tasks fell to Major Jallud, who became prime minister in place of Gaddafi, in 1972. Two years later, Jallud assumed Gaddafi's remaining administrative and protocol duties to allow Gaddafi to devote his time to revolutionary theorizing. Gaddafi remained commander-in-chief of the armed forces and effective head of state. The foreign press speculated about an eclipse of his authority and personality within the RCC, but Gaddafi soon dispelled such theories by his measures to restructure Libyan society.

==== Alignment with the Soviet bloc ====
After the September coup, U.S. forces proceeded deliberately with the planned withdrawal from Wheelus Air Base under the agreement made with the previous government. The foreign minister, Salah Busir, played an important role in negotiating the British and American military withdrawal from the new republic. The last of the American contingent turned the facility over to the Libyans on 11 June 1970, a date thereafter celebrated in Libya as a national holiday. On 27 March 1970, the British air base in El Adem and the naval base in Tobruk were abandoned.

As relations with the U.S. steadily deteriorated, Gaddafi forged close links with the Soviet Union and other Eastern Bloc countries, all the while maintaining Libya's stance as a nonaligned country and opposing the spread of communism in the Arab world. Libya's army – sharply increased from the 6,000-man pre-revolutionary force that had been trained and equipped by the British – was armed with Soviet-built armor and missiles.

==== Petroleum politics ====
The economic base for Libya's revolution has been its oil revenues. However, Libya's petroleum reserves were small compared with those of other major Arab petroleum-producing states. As a consequence, Libya was more ready to ration output in order to conserve its natural wealth and less responsive to moderating its price-rise demands than the other countries. Petroleum was seen both as a means of financing the economic and social development of a woefully underdeveloped country and as a political weapon to brandish in the Arab struggle against Israel.

The increase in production that followed the 1969 revolution was accompanied by Libyan demands for higher petroleum prices, a greater share of revenues, and more control over the development of the country's petroleum industry. Foreign petroleum companies agreed to a price hike of more than three times the going rate (from US$0.90 to US$3.45 per barrel) early in 1971. In December, the Libyan government suddenly nationalized the holdings of British Petroleum in Libya and withdrew funds amounting to approximately US$550 million invested in British banks as a result of a foreign policy dispute. British Petroleum rejected as inadequate a Libyan offer of compensation, and the British treasury banned Libya from participation in the Sterling Area.

In 1973, the Libyan government announced the nationalization of a controlling interest in all other petroleum companies operating in the country. This step gave Libya control of about 60 percent of its domestic oil production by early 1974, a figure that subsequently rose to 70 percent. Total nationalization was out of the question, given the need for foreign expertise and funds in oil exploration, production, and distribution.

Due to Libya's high oil revenues, the Gaddafi government introduced an economic initiative in 1973 labeled, the Three year Economic And Social Development Plan. This policy had staunch goals of increasing annual economic growth at 11% which disproportionally favored gains in the non-oil sector, marking a clear indicator that the regime aimed to diversify the economy. Additionally, Libya began to use its oil revenues to fund its revolutionary ideology throughout the rest of the 70s, as bureaucracy became routinely undermined while, concurrently, Gaddafi seized more power.

This transition towards a more autocratic leadership and myriad of funding through oil revenues, allowed Gaddafi to establish the formation of the Third Universal Theory that was outlined in the famous Green Book. The culmination of Libya's oil revenue and Gaddafi's developing unchecked power allowed the regime to spend seemingly unlimited, and also unrestrained money in its initiative to enact the populist Green Book agenda. However, the growing number of populist measures undertaken by Gaddafi coincidently brought more degradation unto the regimes management, and economic reform was put on hold to prioritize social policies, which slowly ran out of funds because of economic blockades from the west.

===== 1973 oil crisis =====
Insisting on the continued use of petroleum as leverage against Israel and its supporters in the West, Libya strongly urged the Organization of Petroleum Exporting Countries (OPEC) to take action in 1973, and Libyan militancy was partially responsible for OPEC measures to raise oil prices, impose embargoes, and gain control of production. On 19 October 1973, Libya was the first Arab nation to issue an oil embargo against the United States after US President Richard Nixon announced the US would provide Israel with a $2.2 billion military aid program during the Yom Kippur War. Saudi Arabia and other Arab oil producing nations in OPEC would follow suit the next day.

While the other Arab nations lifted their oil embargoes on 18 March 1974, the Gaddafi regime refused to do so. As a consequence of such policies, Libya's oil production declined by half between 1970 and 1974, while revenues from oil exports more than quadrupled. Production continued to fall, bottoming out at an eleven-year low in 1975 at a time when the government was preparing to invest large amounts of petroleum revenues in other sectors of the economy. Thereafter, output stabilized at about two million barrels per day. Production and hence income declined yet again in the early 1980s because of the high price of Libyan crude and because recession in the industrialized world reduced demand for oil from all sources.

Libya's Five-Year Economic and Social Transformation Plan (1976–80), announced in 1975, was programmed to pump US$20 billion into the development of a broad range of economic activities that would continue to provide income after Libya's petroleum reserves had been exhausted. Agriculture was slated to receive the largest share of aid in an effort to make Libya self-sufficient in food and to help keep the rural population on the land. Industry, of which there was little before the revolution, also received a significant amount of funding in the first development plan as well as in the second, launched in 1981.

=== Transition to the Jamahiriya (1973–1977) ===
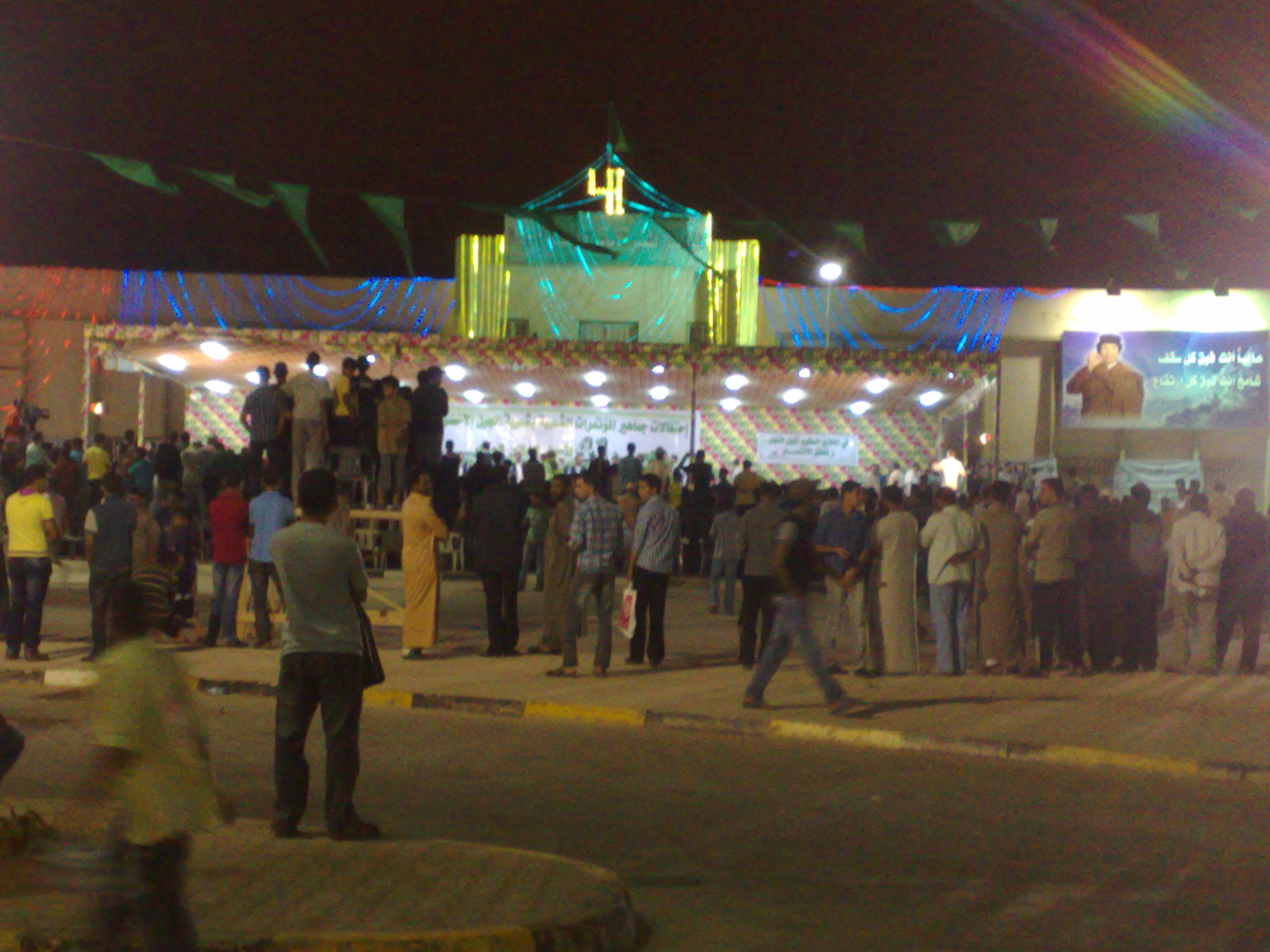
Alfateh Festivity in Bayda, Libya, on 1 September 2010

The "remaking of Libyan society" contained in Gaddafi's ideological visions began to be put into practice formally in 1973, with a cultural revolution. This revolution was designed to create bureaucratic efficiency, public interest and participation in the subnational governmental system, and national political coordination. In an attempt to instill revolutionary fervor into his compatriots and to involve large numbers of them in political affairs, Gaddafi urged them to challenge traditional authority and to take over and run government organs themselves. The instrument for doing this was the people's committee. Within a few months, such committees were found all across Libya. They were functionally and geographically based, and eventually became responsible for local and regional administration.

People's committees were established in such widely divergent organizations as universities, private business firms, government bureaucracies, and the broadcast media. Geographically based committees were formed at the governorate, municipal, and zone (lowest) levels. Seats on the people's committees at the zone level were filled by direct popular election; members so elected could then be selected for service at higher levels. By mid-1973 estimates of the number of people's committees ranged above 2,000. In the scope of their administrative and regulatory tasks and the method of their members' selection, the people's committees purportedly embodied the concept of direct democracy that Gaddafi propounded in the first volume of The Green Book, which appeared in 1976. The same concept lay behind proposals to create a new political structure composed of "people's congresses". The centerpiece of the new system was the General People's Congress (GPC), a national representative body intended to replace the RCC.

==== 7 April 1976 protests ====
During this transition, on 7 April 1976, students of universities in Tripoli and Benghazi protested against human rights violations and the military's control over "all aspects of life in Libya"; the students called for free and fair elections to take place and for power to be transferred to a civilian government. Violent counter-demonstrations took place, with a number of students imprisoned. On 7 April 1977, the anniversary of the event, students (including Omar Dabob and Muhammed Ben Saoud) were publicly executed in Benghazi, with anti-Gaddafi military officers executed later in the week. Friends of the executees were forced to participate in or observe the executions. Annual public executions would go on to continue each year, on 7 April, until the late 1980s.

== Great Socialist People's Libyan Arab Jamahiriya (1977–2011) ==
Socialist People's Libyan Arab Jamahiriya (1977–1986) اَلْجَمَاهِيرِيَّة ٱلْعَرَبِيَّة ٱللِّيبِيَّة ٱلشَّعْبِيَّة ٱلْإِشْتِرَاكِيَّة (Arabic) al-Jamāhīrīyya al-'Arabīyya al-Lībīyya al-Sha'bīyya al-Ishtirākīyya Great Socialist People's Libyan Arab Jamahiriya (1986–2011) اَلْجَمَاهِيرِيَّة ٱلْعَرَبِيَّة ٱللِّيبِيَّة ٱلشَّعْبِيَّة ٱلْإِشْتِرَاكِيَّة ٱلْعُظْمَى (Arabic) al-Jamāhīrīyya al-'Arabīyya al-Lībīyya al-Sha'bīyya al-Ishtirākīyya al-'Uẓmá
- 1977–2011
- Flag Coat of arms
- Motto: وَحْدَةٌ، حُرِّيَّةٌ، اِشْتِرَاكِيَّةٌ Waḥda, Ḥurriyya, Ishtirākiyya "Unity, Freedom, Socialism"
- Anthem: ٱللَّٰهُ أَكْبَرُ Allāhu Akbar "God Is the Greatest"
- Capital: Tripoli (1977–2011); Sirte (2011)
- Largest city: Tripoli
- Official languages: Arabic^{[b]}
- Spoken languages: Libyan Arabic; Berber; Italian
- Minority Languages: Teda; Italian
- Ethnic groups: 97% Arab-Berber; 3% Others
- Religion: Islam
- Government: Unitary jamahiriya state under an authoritarian dictatorship.
- Brotherly Leader and Guide of the Revolution
  - 1979–2011: Muammar Gaddafi
- Secretary-General of the General People's Congress (head of state and head of legislature)
  - 1977–1979 (first): Muammar Gaddafi
  - 2010–2011 (last): Mohamed Abu al-Qasim al-Zwai
- Secretary-General of the General People's Committee (head of government)
  - 1977–1979 (first): Abdul Ati al-Obeidi
  - 2006–2011 (last): Baghdadi Mahmudi
- Legislature: General People's Congress
- Historical era: Cold War · War on terror · Arab Spring
  - People's Authority: 2 March 1977
  - First Civil War: 15 February 2011
  - Fall of Tripoli: 23 August 2011
  - Gaddafi killed: 20 October 2011

Area
  - Total: 1,759,541 km^{2} (679,363 sq mi) (16th)

Population
  - 2010: 6,355,100
- GDP (nominal): 2007 estimate
  - Total: ▲$58.3 billion
  - Per capita: ▲$14,364
- HDI (2009): ▲0.750 high
- Currency: Libyan dinar (LYD)
- Calling code: 218
- ISO 3166 code: LY
Preceded by	Succeeded by
Libyan Arab Republic	Libya

On 2 March 1977, the General People's Congress (GPC), at Gaddafi's behest, adopted the "Declaration on the Establishment of the Authority of the People" and proclaimed the Socialist People's Libyan Arab Jamahiriya (Arabic: الجماهيرية العربية الليبية الشعبية الإشتراكية al-Jamāhīrīyya al-'Arabīyya al-Lībīyya al-Sha'bīyya al-Ishtirākīyya). In the official political philosophy of Gaddafi's state, the "Jamahiriya" system was unique to the country, although it was presented as the materialization of the Third International Theory, proposed by Gaddafi to be applied to the entire Third World. The GPC also created the General Secretariat of the GPC, comprising the remaining members of the defunct Revolutionary Command Council, with Gaddafi as general secretary, and also appointed the General People's Committee, which replaced the Council of Ministers, its members now called secretaries rather than ministers.

The Libyan government claimed that the Jamahiriya was a direct democracy without any political parties, governed by its populace through local popular councils and communes (named Basic People's Congresses). Official rhetoric disdained the idea of a nation state, tribal bonds remaining primary, even within the ranks of the Libyan Armed Forces. Power was still centralized within the central government's overview.

=== Etymology ===
Jamahiriya (Arabic: جماهيرية jamāhīrīyah) is an Arabic term generally translated as "state of the masses"; Lisa Anderson has suggested "peopledom" or "state of the masses" as reasonable approximations of the meaning of the term as intended by Gaddafi. The term does not occur in this sense in Muammar Gaddafi's Green Book of 1975. The nisba-adjective jamāhīrīyah ("mass-, "of the masses") occurs only in the third part, published in 1981, in the phrase إن الحركات التاريخية هي الحركات الجماهيرية (Inna al-ḥarakāt at-tārīkhīyah hiya al-ḥarakāt al-jamāhīrīyah), translated in the English edition as "Historic movements are mass movements".

The word jamāhīrīyah was derived from jumhūrīyah, which is the usual Arabic translation of "republic". It was coined by changing the component jumhūr – "public" – to its plural form, jamāhīr – "the masses". Thus, it is similar to the term People's Republic. It is often left untranslated in English, with the long-form name thus rendered as Great Socialist People's Libyan Arab Jamahiriya. However, in Hebrew, for instance, jamāhīrīyah is translated as "קהילייה" (qehiliyáh), a word also used to translate the term "Commonwealth" when referring to the designation of a country.

After weathering the 1986 U.S. bombing by the Reagan administration, Gaddafi added the specifier "Great" (العظمى al-'Uẓmá) to the official name of the country.

=== Reforms (1977–1980) ===
==== Gaddafi as permanent "Brotherly Leader and Guide of the Revolution" ====
The changes in Libyan leadership since 1976 culminated in March 1979, when the General People's Congress declared that the "vesting of power in the masses" and the "separation of the state from the revolution" were complete. The government was divided into two parts, the "Jamahiriya sector" and the "revolutionary sector". The "Jamahiriya sector" was composed of the General People's Congress, the General People's Committee, and the local Basic People's Congresses. Gaddafi relinquished his position as general secretary of the General People's Congress, as which he was succeeded by Abdul Ati al-Obeidi, who had been prime minister since 1977.

The "Jamahiriya sector" was overseen by the "revolutionary sector", headed by Gaddafi as "Leader of the Revolution" (Qā'id)^{A} and the surviving members of the Revolutionary Command Council. The leaders of the revolutionary sector were not subject to election, as they owed office to their role in the 1969 coup. They oversaw the "revolutionary committees", which were nominally grass-roots organizations that helped keep the people engaged. As a result, although Gaddafi held no formal government office after 1979, he retained control of the government and the country. Gaddafi also remained supreme commander of the armed forces.

==== Administrative reforms ====
All legislative and executive authority was vested in the GPC. This body, however, delegated most of its important authority to its general secretary and General Secretariat and to the General People's Committee. Gaddafi, as general secretary of the GPC, remained the primary decision maker, just as he had been when chairman of the RCC. In turn, all adults had the right and duty to participate in the deliberation of their local Basic People's Congress (BPC), whose decisions were passed up to the GPC for consideration and implementation as national policy. The BPCs were in theory the repository of ultimate political authority and decision making, embodying what Gaddafi termed direct "people's power". The 1977 declaration and its accompanying resolutions amounted to a fundamental revision of the 1969 constitutional proclamation, especially with respect to the structure and organization of the government at both national and subnational levels.

Continuing to revamp Libya's political and administrative structure, Gaddafi introduced yet another element into the body politic. Beginning in 1977, "revolutionary committees" were organized and assigned the task of "absolute revolutionary supervision of people's power"; that is, they were to guide the people's committees, "raise the general level of political consciousness and devotion to revolutionary ideals". In reality, the revolutionary committees were used to survey the population and repress any political opposition to Gaddafi's autocratic rule. The Revolutionary Committees resemble similar systems in totalitarian countries; reportedly, 10 to 20 percent of Libyans worked in surveillance for these committees, a proportion of informants on par with Ba'athist Iraq and Juche Korea, with surveillance taking place in government, in factories, and in the education sector. They also posted bounties for the killing of Libyan critics charged with treason abroad. Opposition activists were occasionally executed publicly and the executions were rebroadcast on public television channels.

Filled with politically astute zealots, the ubiquitous revolutionary committees in 1979 assumed control of BPC elections. Although they were not official government organs, the revolutionary committees became another mainstay of the domestic political scene. As with the people's committees and other administrative innovations since the revolution, the revolutionary committees fit the pattern of imposing a new element on the existing subnational system of government rather than eliminating or consolidating already existing structures. By the late 1970s, the result was an unnecessarily complex system of overlapping jurisdictions in which cooperation and coordination among different elements were compromised by ill-defined authority and responsibility. The ambiguity may have helped serve Gaddafi's aim to remain the prime mover behind Libyan governance, while minimizing his visibility at a time when internal opposition to political repression was rising.

The RCC was formally dissolved and the government was again reorganized into people's committees. A new General People's Committee (cabinet) was selected, each of its "secretaries" becoming head of a specialized people's committee; the exceptions were the "secretariats" of petroleum, foreign affairs, and heavy industry, where there were no people's committees. A proposal was also made to establish a "people's army" by substituting a national militia, being formed in the late 1970s, for the national army. Although the idea surfaced again in early 1982, it did not appear to be close to implementation.

Gaddafi also wanted to combat the strict social restrictions that had been imposed on women by the previous regime, establishing the Revolutionary Women's Formation to encourage reform. In 1970, a law was introduced affirming equality of the sexes and insisting on wage parity. In 1971, Gaddafi sponsored the creation of a Libyan General Women's Federation. In 1972, a law was passed criminalizing the marriage of any females under the age of sixteen and ensuring that a woman's consent was a necessary prerequisite for a marriage. The regime aimed to integrate women into the workforce, stretching beyond equal pay with policies including free child care, cash benefits for a family's first child, and pensions for women after they retired starting at age 55.

In the early 1980s, the Gaddafi government introduced initiatives to integrate women into the armed forces. One division, known as the "Nuns of Revolution", was an all-women special police force unit closely tied to the Revolutionary Committees. In 1984, the regime mandated conscription for women and encouraged their involvement in female military academies, which were first established in 1979. The Gaddafi regime's policies suggested a positive attitude surrounding women's rights was quite clear due to their consistent attempts at political reform, however the implementation of their policies fell into a grey area, where Libyan reforms wholly pulled women into a turbulent dichotomy consisting of political institutions pulling them in one direction, and more traditional social norms the other, continuously battling under the regime throughout the 1970s and 80s.

==== Economic reforms ====
Remaking of the economy was parallel with the attempt to remold political and social institutions. Until the late 1970s, Libya's economy was mixed, with a large role for private enterprise except in the fields of oil production and distribution, banking, and insurance. But according to volume two of Gaddafi's Green Book, which appeared in 1978, private retail trade, rent, and wages were forms of exploitation that should be abolished. Instead, workers' self-management committees and profit participation partnerships were to function in public and private enterprises.

A property law was passed that forbade ownership of more than one private dwelling, and Libyan workers took control of a large number of companies, turning them into state-run enterprises. Retail and wholesale trading operations were replaced by state-owned "people's supermarkets", where Libyans in theory could purchase whatever they needed at low prices. By 1981 the state had also restricted access to individual bank accounts to draw upon privately held funds for government projects. The measures created resentment and opposition among the newly dispossessed. The latter joined those already alienated, some of whom had begun to leave the country. By 1982, perhaps 50,000 to 100,000 Libyans had gone abroad; because a number of the emigrants were among the enterprising and better educated Libyans, they represented a significant loss of managerial and technical expertise.

The government also built a trans-Sahara water pipeline from major aquifers to both a network of reservoirs and the towns of Tripoli, Sirte and Benghazi in 2006–2007. It is part of the Great Man-Made River project, started in 1984. It is pumping large resources of water from the Nubian Sandstone Aquifer System to both urban populations and new irrigation projects around the country.

Libya continued to be plagued with a shortage of skilled labor, which had to be imported along with a broad range of consumer goods, both paid for with petroleum income. The country consistently ranked as the African nation with the highest HDI, standing at 0.755 in 2010, which was 0.041 higher than the next highest African HDI that same year. Gender equality was a major achievement under Gaddafi's rule. According to Lisa Anderson, president of the American University in Cairo and an expert on Libya, said that under Gaddafi more women attended university and had "dramatically" more employment opportunities than most Arab nations.

=== Military ===
==== Wars against Chad and Egypt ====
As early as 1969, Gaddafi waged a campaign against Chad. Scholar Gerard Prunier claims part of his hostility was apparently because Chadian President François Tombalbaye was Christian. Libya was also involved in a sometimes violent territorial dispute with neighbouring Chad over the Aouzou Strip, which Libya occupied in 1973. This dispute eventually led to the Libyan invasion of Chad. The prolonged foray of Libyan troops into the Aozou Strip in northern Chad, was finally repulsed in 1987, when extensive US and French help to Chadian rebel forces and the government headed by former Defence Minister Hissein Habré finally led to a Chadian victory in the so-called Toyota War. The conflict ended in a ceasefire in 1987. After a judgement of the International Court of Justice on 13 February 1994, Libya withdrew troops from Chad the same year and the dispute was settled. Libyans heavily opposed this war considering the fact that thousands of high schoolers were taken out of their schools and were forced into battle by the Gaddafi regime. This left families confused and worried about their kids who did not return home from school.

On 21 July 1977, there were first gun battles between troops on the border, followed by land and air strikes leading to Gaddafi to dispatch his military across the border to Egypt, but Egyptian forces fought back in the Egyptian–Libyan War. Relations between the Libyan and Egyptian governments had been deteriorating ever since the end of the Yom Kippur War from October 1973, due to Libyan opposition to President Anwar Sadat's peace policy as well as the breakdown of unification talks between the two governments. There is some proof that the Egyptian government was considering a war against Libya as early as 1974. On 28 February 1974, during Henry Kissinger's visit to Egypt, President Sadat told him about such intentions and requested that pressure be put on the Israeli government not to launch an attack on Egypt in the event of its forces being occupied in war with Libya. In addition, the Egyptian government had broken its military ties with Moscow, while the Libyan government kept that cooperation going. The Egyptian government also gave assistance to former RCC members Major Abdel Moneim al-Houni and Umar Muhayshi, who unsuccessfully tried to overthrow Gaddafi in 1975, and allowed them to reside in Egypt. During 1976 relations were ebbing, as the Egyptian government claimed to have discovered a Libyan plot to overthrow the government in Cairo. On 26 January 1976, Egyptian Vice President Hosni Mubarak indicated in a talk with the US Ambassador Hermann Eilts that the Egyptian government intended to exploit internal problems in Libya to promote actions against Libya, but did not elaborate. On 22 July 1976, the Libyan government made a public threat to break diplomatic relations with Cairo if Egyptian subversive actions continued. On 8 August 1976, an explosion occurred in the bathroom of a government office in Tahrir Square in Cairo, injuring 14, and the Egyptian government and media claimed this was done by Libyan agents.

The Egyptian government also claimed to have arrested two Egyptian citizens trained by Libyan intelligence to perform sabotage within Egypt. On 23 August, an Egyptian passenger plane was hijacked by persons who reportedly worked with Libyan intelligence. They were captured by Egyptian authorities in an operation that ended without any casualties. In retaliation for accusations by the Egyptian government of Libyan complicity in the hijacking, the Libyan government ordered the closure of the Egyptian Consulate in Benghazi. On 24 July, the combatants agreed to a ceasefire under the mediation of the President of Algeria Houari Boumediène and the Palestine Liberation Organization Chairman Yasser Arafat.

==== Revolutionary Guard Corps ====
The Revolutionary Guard Corps (Liwa Haris al-Jamahiriya) or "Jamahiriya Guard" was a key Gaddafi protection force, until his death in October 2011. Composed of 3,000 men hand-picked from Gaddafi's tribal group in the Sirte region, the Guard was well armed, being provided with T-54 and T-62 tanks, armoured personnel carriers, multiple rocket launchers, SA-8 surface to air missiles, and ZSU-23-4 anti-aircraft vehicles taken from the army inventory. As of 2005, its commander was Hasan al-Kabir al-Gaddafi, a cousin of the former Libyan leader.

The Revolutionary Guard developed from the Revolutionary Committees, even if the latter had at first been introduced only into workplaces and communities, and not extended to the military. After the early 1980s, however, the Revolutionary Guard, as a paramilitary wing of the Revolutionary Committees, became entrenched within the armed forces. They served as a parallel channel of control, a means of ideological indoctrination in the barracks, and an apparatus for monitoring suspicious behavior. The Revolutionary Guards reportedly held the keys to ammunition stockpiles at the main military bases, doling it out in small quantities as needed by the regular forces. Their influence increased after a coup attempt in May 1985, that was blocked mainly thanks to the action of the Revolutionary Guard that engaged regular army units in a series of street battles.

==== Islamic Legion ====
In 1972, Gaddafi created the Islamic Legion as a tool to unify and Arabize the region. The priority of the Legion was first Chad, and then Sudan. In Darfur, a western province of Sudan, Gaddafi supported the creation of Tajammu al-Arabi, which according to Gérard Prunier was "a militantly racist and pan-Arabist organization which stressed the 'Arab' character of the province." The two organizations shared members and a source of support, and the distinction between them is often ambiguous.

This Islamic Legion was mostly composed of immigrants from poorer Sahelian countries, but also, according to a source, thousands of Pakistanis who had been recruited in 1981 with the false promise of civilian jobs once in Libya. Generally speaking, the Legion's members were immigrants who had gone to Libya with no thought of fighting wars, and had been provided with inadequate military training and had sparse commitment. A French journalist, speaking of the Legion's forces in Chad, observed that they were "foreigners, Arabs or Africans, mercenaries in spite of themselves, wretches who had come to Libya hoping for a civilian job, but found themselves signed up more or less by force to go and fight in an unknown desert."

At the beginning of the 1987 Libyan offensive in Chad, it maintained a force of 2,000 in Darfur. The nearly continuous cross-border raids that resulted greatly contributed to a separate ethnic conflict within Darfur that killed about 9,000 people between 1985 and 1988.

The Janjaweed, a group accused by the US of carrying out a genocide in Darfur in the 2000s, emerged in 1988 and some of its leaders are former legionnaires.

==== Pan-African Legion ====
In about 1980, Gaddafi introduced the Islamic Pan-African Legion, a body recruited primarily among dissidents from Sudan, Egypt, Tunisia, Mali, and Chad. West African states with Muslim populations have also been the source of some personnel. Believed to consist of about 7,000 individuals, the force has received training from experienced Palestinian and Syrian instructors. Some of those recruited to the legion were said to have been forcibly impressed from among nationals of neighboring countries who migrated to Libya in search of work.

The International Institute for Strategic Studies Military Balance estimated that the force was organized into one armored, one infantry, and one paratroop/commando brigade. It has been supplied with T-54 and T-55 tanks, armored personnel carriers, and EE-9 armored cars. The Islamic Pan-African Legion was reported to have been committed during the fighting in Chad in 1980 and was praised by Gaddafi for its success there. However, it was believed that some of the troops who fled the Chadian attacks of March 1987 were members of the Legion.

==== Islamic Arab Legion ====
In an effort to realise Gaddafi's vision of a united Arab military force, plans for the creation of an Islamic Arab Legion were being announced from time to time. The goal, according to the Libyan press, would be to assemble an army of one million men and women fighters to prepare for the great Arab battle – "the battle of liberating Palestine, of toppling the reactionary regimes, of annihilating the borders, gates, and barriers between the countries of the Arab homeland, and of creating the single Arab Jamahiriya from the ocean to the gulf". In March 1985, it was announced that the National Command of the Revolutionary Forces Command in the Arab Nation had been formed with Gaddafi at its head. A number of smaller radical Arab groups from Lebanon, Tunisia, Sudan, Iraq, the Persian Gulf states, and Jordan were represented at the inaugural meeting. Syrian Ba'ath Party and radical Palestinian factions were also present. Each of these movements was expected to earmark 10 per cent of its forces for service under the new command. As of April 1987, there was no information confirming the existence of such a militia.

==== Attempts at nuclear and chemical weapons ====
In 1972, Gaddafi tried to buy a nuclear bomb from China. He then tried to get a bomb from Pakistan, but Pakistan severed its ties before it succeeded in building a bomb. In 1978, Gaddafi turned to Pakistan's rival, India, for help building its own nuclear bomb. In July 1978, Libya and India signed a memorandum of understanding to cooperate in peaceful applications of nuclear energy as part of India's Atom of Peace policy. In 1991, then Prime Minister Navaz Sharif paid a state visit to Libya to hold talks on the promotion of a Free Trade Agreement between Pakistan and Libya. However, Gaddafi focused on demanding Pakistan's Prime Minister sell him a nuclear weapon, which surprised a number of the Prime Minister's delegation members and journalists. When Prime Minister Sharif refused Gaddafi's demand, Gaddafi disrespected him, calling him a "corrupt politician", a term which insulted and surprised Sharif. The Prime Minister cancelled the talks, returned to Pakistan and expelled the Libyan ambassador to Pakistan.

Thailand reported its citizens had helped build storage facilities for nerve gas. Germany sentenced a businessman, Jurgen Hippenstiel-Imhausen, to five years in prison for involvement in Libyan chemical weapons. Inspectors from the Chemical Weapons Convention (CWC) verified in 2004 that Libya owned a stockpile of 23 metric tons of mustard gas and more than 1,300 metric tons of precursor chemicals.

==== Gulf of Sidra incidents and US air strikes ====
When Libya was under pressure from international disputes, on 19 August 1981, a naval dogfight occurred over the Gulf of Sirte in the Mediterranean Sea. US F-14 Tomcat jets fired anti-aircraft missiles against a formation of Libyan fighter jets in this dogfight and shot down two Libyan Su-22 Fitter attack aircraft. This naval action was a result of claiming the territory and losses from the previous incident. A second dogfight occurred on 4 January 1989; US carrier-based jets also shot down two Libyan MiG-23 Flogger-Es in the same place.

A similar action occurred on 23 March 1986; while patrolling the Gulf, US naval forces attacked a sizable naval force and various SAM sites defending Libyan territory. US fighter jets and fighter-bombers destroyed SAM launching facilities and sank various naval vessels, killing 35 seamen. This was a reprisal for terrorist hijackings between June and December 1985.

On 5 April 1986, agents “La Belle" nightclub in West Berlin was bombed, killing three and injuring 229. The plan was intercepted by several national intelligence agencies and more detailed information was retrieved four years later from Stasi archives. The agents who had carried out the operation, who some Western governments claimed to be acting on Gaddafi's orders, were prosecuted by the reunited Germany in the 1990s.

In response to the discotheque bombing, a US air-strike was launched against Libya on 15 April 1986. It was code-named Operation El Dorado Canyon. Air defenses, three army bases, and two airfields in Tripoli and Benghazi were bombed. The surgical strikes failed to kill Gaddafi but he lost a few dozen military officers. Gaddafi spread propaganda how it had killed his "adopted daughter" and how victims had been all "civilians". Despite the variations of the stories, the campaign was successful, and a large proportion of the Western press reported the government's stories as facts.

Following the 1986 bombing of Libya, Gaddafi intensified his support for anti-American government organizations. He financed Jeff Fort's Al-Rukn faction of the Chicago Black P. Stones gang, in their emergence as an indigenous anti-American armed revolutionary movement. Al-Rukn members were arrested in 1986 for preparing strikes on behalf of Libya, including blowing up US government buildings and bringing down an airplane; the Al-Rukn defendants were convicted in 1987 of "offering to commit bombings and assassinations on US soil for Libyan payment." In 1986, Libyan state television announced that Libya was training suicide squads to attack American and European interests. He began financing the IRA again in 1986, to retaliate against the British for harboring American fighter planes.

Gaddafi announced that he had won a spectacular military victory over the US and the country was officially renamed the "Great Socialist People's Libyan Arab Jamahiriyah". However, his speech appeared devoid of passion and even the "victory" celebrations appeared unusual. Criticism of Gaddafi by ordinary Libyan citizens became more bold, such as defacing of Gaddafi posters. The raids against Libyan military had brought the government to its weakest point in 17 years.

== International relations ==
=== Africa ===
Gaddafi was a close supporter of Ugandan President Idi Amin.

Gaddafi sent thousands of Libyan troops to fight against Tanzania in the Uganda–Tanzania War, on behalf of Idi Amin. About 600 Libyan soldiers lost their lives attempting to defend the collapsing regime of Amin. After the fall of Kampala, Amin was eventually exiled from Uganda to Libya before settling in Saudi Arabia.

Gaddafi facilitated peace talks on multiple occasions between Rwanda and Uganda during the Second Congo War. Both countries signed a ceasefire in the Libyan town of Sirte, however the agreement was never implemented after refusal from both of the involved parties.

Gaddafi also aided Jean-Bédel Bokassa, the Emperor of the Central African Empire. He also intervened militarily in the restored Central African Republic during the 2001 coup attempt, to protect his ally Ange-Félix Patassé. Patassé signed a deal giving Libya a 99-year lease to exploit all of that country's natural resources, including uranium, copper, diamonds, and oil.

Gaddafi supported Soviet protégé Mengistu Haile Mariam of Ethiopia. He also supported the Somali rebel groups, SNM and SSDF in their fight to overthrow the dictatorship of Siad Barre.

Gaddafi was a strong opponent of apartheid in South Africa and forged a friendship with Nelson Mandela. One of Mandela's grandsons is named Gaddafi, an indication of the latter's support in South Africa. Gaddafi funded Mandela's 1994 election campaign, and after taking office as the country's first democratically elected president in 1994, Mandela rejected entreaties from U.S. President Bill Clinton and others to cut ties with Gaddafi. Mandela later played a key role in helping Gaddafi gain mainstream acceptance in the Western world later in the 1990s. Over the years, Gaddafi came to be seen as a hero in much of Africa due to his revolutionary image.

Gaddafi was a strong supporter of Zimbabwean President Robert Mugabe.

Gaddafi's World Revolutionary Center (WRC) near Benghazi became a training center for groups backed by Gaddafi. Graduates in power as of 2011 include Blaise Compaoré of Burkina Faso and Idriss Déby of Chad.

Gaddafi trained and supported Liberian warlord-president Charles Taylor, who was indicted by the Special Court for Sierra Leone for war crimes and crimes against humanity committed during the conflict in Sierra Leone. Foday Sankoh, the founder of Revolutionary United Front, was also Gaddafi's graduate. According to Douglas Farah, "The amputation of the arms and legs of men, women, and children as part of a scorched-earth campaign was designed to take over the region's rich diamond fields and was backed by Gaddafi, who routinely reviewed their progress and supplied weapons".

Gaddafi's strong military support and finances gained him allies across the continent. He had himself crowned with the title "King of Kings of Africa" in 2008, in the presence of over 200 African traditional rulers and kings, although his views on African political and military unification received a lukewarm response from their governments. His 2009 forum for African kings was canceled by the Ugandan hosts, who believed that traditional rulers discussing politics would lead to instability. On 1 February 2009, a 'coronation ceremony' in Addis Ababa, Ethiopia, was held to coincide with the 53rd African Union Summit, at which he was elected head of the African Union for the year. Gaddafi told the assembled African leaders: "I shall continue to insist that our sovereign countries work to achieve the United States of Africa."

=== Gaddafi and international militant resistance movements ===
1972 newsreel including interview with Gaddafi about his support for radical groups

In 1971 Gaddafi warned that if France opposes Libyan military occupation of Chad, he will use all weapons in the war against France including the "revolutionary weapon". On 11 June 1972, Gaddafi announced that any Arab wishing to volunteer for Palestinian militant groups "can register his name at any Libyan embassy will be given adequate training for combat". He also promised financial support for attacks. On 7 October 1972, Gaddafi praised the Lod Airport massacre, executed by the communist Japanese Red Army, and demanded Palestinian terrorist groups to carry out similar attacks.

Reportedly, Gaddafi was a major financier of the "Black September Movement" which perpetrated the Munich massacre at the 1972 Summer Olympics. In 1973 the Irish Naval Service intercepted the vessel Claudia in Irish territorial waters, which carried Soviet arms from Libya to the Provisional IRA. In 1976 after a series of terror activities by the Provisional IRA during the Troubles, Gaddafi announced that "the bombs which are convulsing Britain and breaking its spirit are the bombs of Libyan people. We have sent them to the Irish revolutionaries so that the British will pay the price for their past deeds".

In the Philippines, Libya backed the Moro Islamic Liberation Front, which continues to carry out acts of violence in an effort to establish a separatist Islamic state in the southern Philippines. Libya has also supported the New People's Army and Libyan agents were seen meeting with the Communist Party of the Philippines. Islamist terrorist group Abu Sayyaf has also been suspected of receiving Libyan funding.

Gaddafi also became a strong supporter of the Palestine Liberation Organization, which support ultimately harmed Libya's relations with Egypt, when in 1979 Egypt pursued a peace agreement with Israel. As Libya's relations with Egypt worsened, Gaddafi sought closer relations with the Soviet Union. Libya became the first country outside the Soviet bloc to receive the supersonic MiG-25 combat fighters, but Soviet-Libyan relations remained relatively distant. Gaddafi also sought to increase Libyan influence, especially in states with an Islamic population, by calling for the creation of a Saharan Islamic state and supporting anti-government forces in sub-Saharan Africa.

In the 1970s and the 1980s, this support was sometimes so freely given that even the most unsympathetic groups could obtain Libyan support; often the groups represented ideologies far removed from Gaddafi's own. Gaddafi's approach often tended to confuse international opinion.

In October 1981 Egypt's President Anwar Sadat was assassinated. Gaddafi applauded the murder and remarked that it was a "punishment".

In December 1981, the US State Department invalidated US passports for travel to Libya, and in March 1982, the U.S. declared a ban on the import of Libyan oil.

Gaddafi reportedly spent hundreds of millions of the government's money on training and arming Sandinistas in Nicaragua. Daniel Ortega, the President of Nicaragua, was his ally.

In April 1984, Libyan refugees in London protested against execution of two dissidents. Communications intercepted by MI5 show that Tripoli ordered its diplomats to direct violence against the demonstrators. Libyan diplomats shot at 11 people and killed British policewoman Yvonne Fletcher. The incident led to the breaking off of diplomatic relations between the United Kingdom and Libya for over a decade.

After December 1985 Rome and Vienna airport attacks, which killed 19 and wounded around 140, Gaddafi indicated that he would continue to support the Red Army Faction, the Red Brigades, and the Irish Republican Army as long as European countries support anti-Gaddafi Libyans. The Foreign Minister of Libya also called the massacres "heroic acts".

In 1986, Libyan state television announced that Libya was training suicide squads to attack American and European interests.

On 5 April 1986, Libyan agents were alleged with bombing the "La Belle" nightclub in West Berlin, killing three people and injuring 229 people who were spending evening there. Gaddafi's plan was intercepted by Western intelligence. More-detailed information was retrieved years later when Stasi archives were investigated by the reunited Germany. Libyan agents who had carried out the operation from the Libyan embassy in East Germany were prosecuted by reunited Germany in the 1990s.

In May 1987, Australia broke off relations with Libya because of its role in fueling violence in Oceania.

Under Gaddafi, Libya had a long history of supporting the Irish Republican Army during the Troubles. In late 1987 French authorities stopped a merchant vessel, the MV Eksund, which was delivering a 150-ton Libyan arms shipment to the IRA. Throughout the conflict, Gaddafi gave the Provisional IRA with over $12.5 million in cash (the equivalent of roughly $40 million in 2021) and six huge arms shipment. In Britain, Gaddafi's best-known political subsidiary is the Workers Revolutionary Party.

Gaddafi fuelled a number of Islamist and communist groups in the Philippines, including the New People's Army of the Communist Party of the Philippines and the Moro Islamic Liberation Front.

In Indonesia, the Free Aceh Movement was a Libyan-backed militant group. Vanuatu's ruling party enjoyed Libyan support.

In New Zealand, Libya attempted to radicalize Māoris.

In Australia, there were several cases of attempted radicalisation of Aboriginal Australians, with individuals receiving paramilitary training in Libya. Libya put several left-wing unions on the Libyan payroll, such as the Food Preservers Union (FPU) and the Federated Confectioners Association of Australia (FCA). Labor Party politician Bill Hartley, the secretary of Libya-Australia friendship society, was long-term supporter of Gaddafi and Saddam Hussein.

In the 1980s, the Libyan government purchased advertisements in Arabic-language newspapers in Australia asking for Australian Arabs to join the military units of his worldwide struggle against imperialism. In part, because of this, Australia banned recruitment of foreign mercenaries in Australia.

Gaddafi developed a relationship with the Revolutionary Armed Forces of Colombia, becoming acquainted with its leaders in meetings of revolutionary groups regularly hosted in Libya.

Some publications were financed by Gaddafi. The Socialist Labour League's Workers News was one such publication: "in among the routine denunciations of uranium mining and calls for greater trade union militancy would be a couple of pages extolling Gaddafi's fatuous and incoherent green book and the Libyan revolution."

Gaddafi was a lifelong supporter of Kurdish independence. In 2011, Jawad Mella, the president of the Kurdistan National Congress referred to Gaddafi as the "only world leader who truly supports the Kurds".

==== International sanctions after the Lockerbie bombing (1992–2003) ====
Libya was accused in the 1988 bombing of Pan Am Flight 103 over Lockerbie, Scotland; UN sanctions were imposed in 1992. UN Security Council resolutions (UNSCRs) passed in 1992 and 1993 obliged Libya to fulfill requirements related to the Pan Am 103 bombing before sanctions could be lifted, leading to Libya's political and economic isolation for most of the 1990s. The UN sanctions cut airline connections with the outer world, reduced diplomatic representation and prohibited the sale of military equipment. Oil-related sanctions were assessed by some as equally significant for their exceptions: thus sanctions froze Libya's foreign assets (but excluded revenue from oil and natural gas and agricultural commodities) and banned the sale to Libya of refinery or pipeline equipment (but excluded oil production equipment).

Under the sanctions Libya's refining capacity eroded. Libya's role on the international stage grew less provocative after UN sanctions were imposed. In 1999, Libya fulfilled one of the UNSCR requirements by surrendering two Libyans suspected in connection with the bombing for trial before a Scottish court in the Netherlands. One of these suspects, Abdel Basset al-Megrahi, was found guilty; the other was acquitted. UN sanctions against Libya were subsequently suspended. The full lifting of the sanctions, contingent on Libya's compliance with the remaining UNSCRs, including acceptance of responsibility for the actions of its officials and payment of appropriate compensation, was passed 12 September 2003, explicitly linked to the release of up to $2.7 billion in Libyan funds to the families of the 1988 attack's 270 victims.

In 2002, Gaddafi paid a ransom reportedly worth tens of millions of dollars to Abu Sayyaf, a Filipino Islamist militancy, to release a number of kidnapped tourists. He presented it as an act of goodwill to Western countries; nevertheless the money helped the group to expand its operation.

==== Normalization of international relations (2003–2010) ====
In December 2003, Libya announced that it had agreed to reveal and end its programs to develop weapons of mass destruction and to renounce terrorism, and Gaddafi made significant strides in normalizing relations with western nations. He received various Western European leaders as well as a number of working-level and commercial delegations, and made his first trip to Western Europe in 15 years when he traveled to Brussels in April 2004. Libya responded in good faith to legal cases brought against it in U.S. courts for terrorist acts that predate its renunciation of violence. Claims for compensation in the Lockerbie bombing, LaBelle disco bombing, and UTA 772 bombing cases are ongoing. The U.S. rescinded Libya's designation as a state sponsor of terrorism in June 2006. In late 2007, Libya was elected by the General Assembly to a nonpermanent seat on the United Nations Security Council for the 2008–2009 term. In the intercession between normalization and the Libyan Civil War in 2011, Operation Enduring Freedom – Trans Sahara was fought in Libya's portion of the Sahara Desert. This involved usage of American military assets, such as C-130s in combination with Libyan military infrastructure, namely the Al-Watiya Air Base.

=== Purification laws ===
In 1994, the General People's Congress approved the introduction of "purification laws" to be put into effect, punishing theft by the amputation of limbs, and fornication and adultery by flogging. Under the Libyan constitution, homosexual relations are punishable by up to five years in jail.

== Opposition, coups and revolts ==
Throughout his long rule, Gaddafi had to defend his position against opposition and coup attempts, emerging both from the military and from the general population. He reacted to these threats on one hand by maintaining a careful balance of power between the forces in the country, and by brutal repression on the other. Gaddafi successfully balanced the various tribes of Libya one against the other by distributing his favours. To forestall a military coup, he deliberately weakened the Libyan Armed Forces by regularly rotating officers, relying instead on loyal elite troops such as his Revolutionary Guard Corps, the special-forces Khamis Brigade and his personal Amazonian Guard, even though emphasis on political loyalty tended, over the long run, to weaken the professionalism of his personal forces. This trend made the country vulnerable to dissension at a time of crisis, as happened during early 2011.

=== Political repression and "Green Terror" ===
The term "Green Terror" is used to describe campaigns of violence and intimidation against opponents of Gaddafi, particularly in reference to wave of oppression during Libya's cultural revolution, or to the wave of highly publicized hangings of regime opponents that began with the Execution of Al-Sadek Hamed Al-Shuwehdy. Dissent was illegal under Law 75 of 1973. The Revolutionary Committees had been resembling similar systems in totalitarian countries; reportedly, 10 to 20 percent of Libyans worked in surveillance for these committees, a proportion of informants on par with Ba'athist Iraq and Juche Korea, with surveillance taking place in government, in factories, and in the education sector. They also posted bounties for the killing of Libyan critics charged with treason abroad. Opposition activists were occasionally executed publicly and the executions were rebroadcast on public television channels.

Following an abortive attempt to replace English foreign language education with Russian, in recent years English has been taught in Libyan schools from a primary level, and students have access to English-language media. However, one protester in 2011 described the situation as: "None of us can speak English or French. He kept us ignorant and blindfolded".

According to the 2009 Freedom of the Press Index, Libya was the most censored country in the Middle East and North Africa. Prisons were run with little or no documentation of inmate population, and often neglected even such basic data as a prisoner's crime and sentence.

=== Opposition to the Jamahiriya reforms ===
During the late 1970s, some exiled Libyans formed active opposition groups. In early 1979, Gaddafi warned opposition leaders to return home immediately or face "liquidation". When caught, they could face being sentenced and hanged in public.

It is the Libyan people's responsibility to liquidate such scums who are distorting Libya's image abroad.

— Gaddafi talking about exiles in 1982.

Gaddafi employed his network of diplomats and recruits to assassinate dozens of his critics around the world. Amnesty International listed at least twenty-five assassinations between 1980 and 1987.

Gaddafi's agents were active in the UK, where many Libyans had sought asylum. After Libyan diplomats shot at 15 anti-Gaddafi protesters from inside the Libyan embassy's first floor and killed a British policewoman, the UK broke off relations with Gaddafi's government as a result of the incident.

Even the U.S. could not protect dissidents from Libya. In 1980, a Libyan agent attempted to assassinate dissident Faisal Zagallai, a doctoral student at the University of Colorado at Boulder. The bullets left Zagallai partially blinded. A defector was kidnapped and executed in 1990 just before he was about to receive U.S. citizenship.

Gaddafi asserted in June 1984 that killings could be carried out even when the dissidents were on pilgrimage in the holy city of Mecca. In August 1984, one Libyan plot was thwarted in Mecca.

As of 2004, Libya still provided bounties for heads of critics, including 1 million dollars for Ashur Shamis, a Libyan-British journalist.

There is indication that between the years of 2002 and 2007, Libya's Gaddafi-era intelligence service had a partnership with western spy organizations including MI6 and the CIA, who voluntarily provided information on Libyan dissidents in the United States and Canada in exchange for using Libya as a base for extraordinary renditions. This was done despite Libya's history of murdering dissidents abroad, and with full knowledge of Libya's brutal mistreatment of detainees.

=== Political unrest during the 1990s ===
In the 1990s, Gaddafi's rule was threatened by militant Islamism. In October 1993, there was an unsuccessful assassination attempt on Gaddafi by elements of the Libyan army. In response, Gaddafi used repressive measures, using his personal Revolutionary Guard Corps to crush riots and Islamist activism during the 1990s. Nevertheless, Cyrenaica between 1995 and 1998 was politically unstable, due to the tribal allegiances of the local troops.

Gaddafi also faced opposition in Tripolitania with several military coups consisting of participants from the Warfalla tribe opposing his initiative to reform tribalism, including the dismantling of hereditary succession. As a result, this policy created a brand new tribal elite which derived their authority directly from Gaddafi and foresaw the creation of the People's Social Leadership Committees. Additionally, these tribal revolts pressured Gaddafi into respecting their prevalence in Libyan society as Gaddafi began to wear more traditional clothes in symbolic appeasement.

The People's Social Leadership Committees were created by Gaddafi to reinforce social stability, distribute subsidies from the regime, and allocate jobs in state institutions. At the time, state employment comprised around 75 percent of the Libyan workforce, along with private commerce being banned in Libya. This led to the people PLCS members appointed by Gaddafi to lead and take control of the priorities their tribes.

== 2011 civil war and collapse of Gaddafi's government ==
A global map of the world showing countries that recognised or had informal relations with the Libyan Republic during the civil war of 2011: Libya Countries that recognised the National Transitional Council (NTC) as the sole legitimate representative of Libya Countries that had permanent informal relations with the NTC, or which voted in favor of recognition at the UN, but had not granted official recognition Countries which opposed recognition of the NTC at the UN, but had not made a formal statement Countries that said they would not recognise the NTC

A renewed serious threat to the Libyan Arab Jamahiriya came in February 2011, with the 2011 Libyan revolution. Inspiration for the unrest is attributed to the uprisings in Tunisia and Egypt, connecting it with the wider Arab Spring. In the east, the National Transitional Council was established in Benghazi. The novelist Idris Al-Mesmari was arrested hours after giving an interview with Al Jazeera about the police reaction to protests in Benghazi on 15 February.

Many Libyan officials had sided with the protesters and requested help from the international community to bring an end to the massacres of civilians. The government in Tripoli had lost control of half of Libya by the end of February, but as of mid-September Gaddafi remained in control of several parts of Fezzan. On 21 September, the forces of NTC captured Sabha, the largest city of Fezzan, reducing the control of Gaddafi to limited and isolated areas.

Many nations condemned Gaddafi's government over its use of force against civilians. Several other nations allied with Gaddafi, accusing the uprising of being a "plot" by "Western powers" to loot Libya's resources. The United Nations Security Council passed a resolution to enforce a no-fly zone over Libyan airspace on 17 March 2011.

The UN resolution authorized air-strikes against Libyan ground troops and warships that threatened civilians. On 19 March, the no-fly zone enforcement began, with French aircraft undertaking sorties across Libya and a naval blockade by the British Royal Navy. Eventually, the aircraft carriers USS Enterprise and Charles de Gaulle arrived off the coast and provided the enforcers with a rapid-response capability. U.S. forces named their part of the enforcement action Operation Odyssey Dawn, meant to "deny the Libyan regime from using force against its own people" according to U.S. Vice Admiral William E. Gortney. More than 110 "Tomahawk" cruise missiles were fired in an initial assault by U.S. warships and a British submarine against Libyan air defences.

The last government holdouts in Sirte finally fell to anti-Gaddafi fighters on 20 October 2011, and, following the controversial death of Muammar Gaddafi, Libya was officially declared "liberated" on 23 October 2011, ending 42 years of Gaddafi's leadership in Libya.

Political scientist Riadh Sidaoui suggested in October 2011 that Gaddafi "has created a great void for his exercise of power: there is no institution, no army, no electoral tradition in the country", and as a result, the period of transition would be difficult in Libya.

== Flags and coat of arms ==
1969–1972

State flag (ratio: 1:2)

Unofficial state flag (ratio: 2:3)

Coat of arms
1972–1977

State flag (ratio: 2:3)

Coat of arms
Naval Ensign
1977–2011

State flag (ratio: 1:2)

Unofficial state flag (ratio: 2:3)

Coat of arms, which retains the name The Federation of Arab Republics
Naval ensign

Military aircraft roundel

Military aircraft fin flash

== See also ==
- Day of Revenge
- Politics of Libya under Muammar Gaddafi
- Foreign relations of Libya under Muammar Gaddafi
- Human rights violations during the Gaddafi regime
- Human rights in Libya
- The Green Book (Gaddafi)
- Gaddafi loyalism
- Gaddafism

== Notes ==
1.^{A} Gaddafi's full title was "Brotherly Leader and Guide to the First of September Great Revolution of the Great Socialist People's Libyan Arab Jamahiriya".
