= Brotherly Leader and Guide of the Revolution =

Unofficial title held by Muammar Gaddafi

Brotherly Leader and Guide of the Revolution of the Great Socialist People's Libyan Arab Jamahiriya
- الأخ القائد ومرشد الثورة الجماهرية العربية الليبية الشعبية الإشتراكية العظمى
- Coat of arms

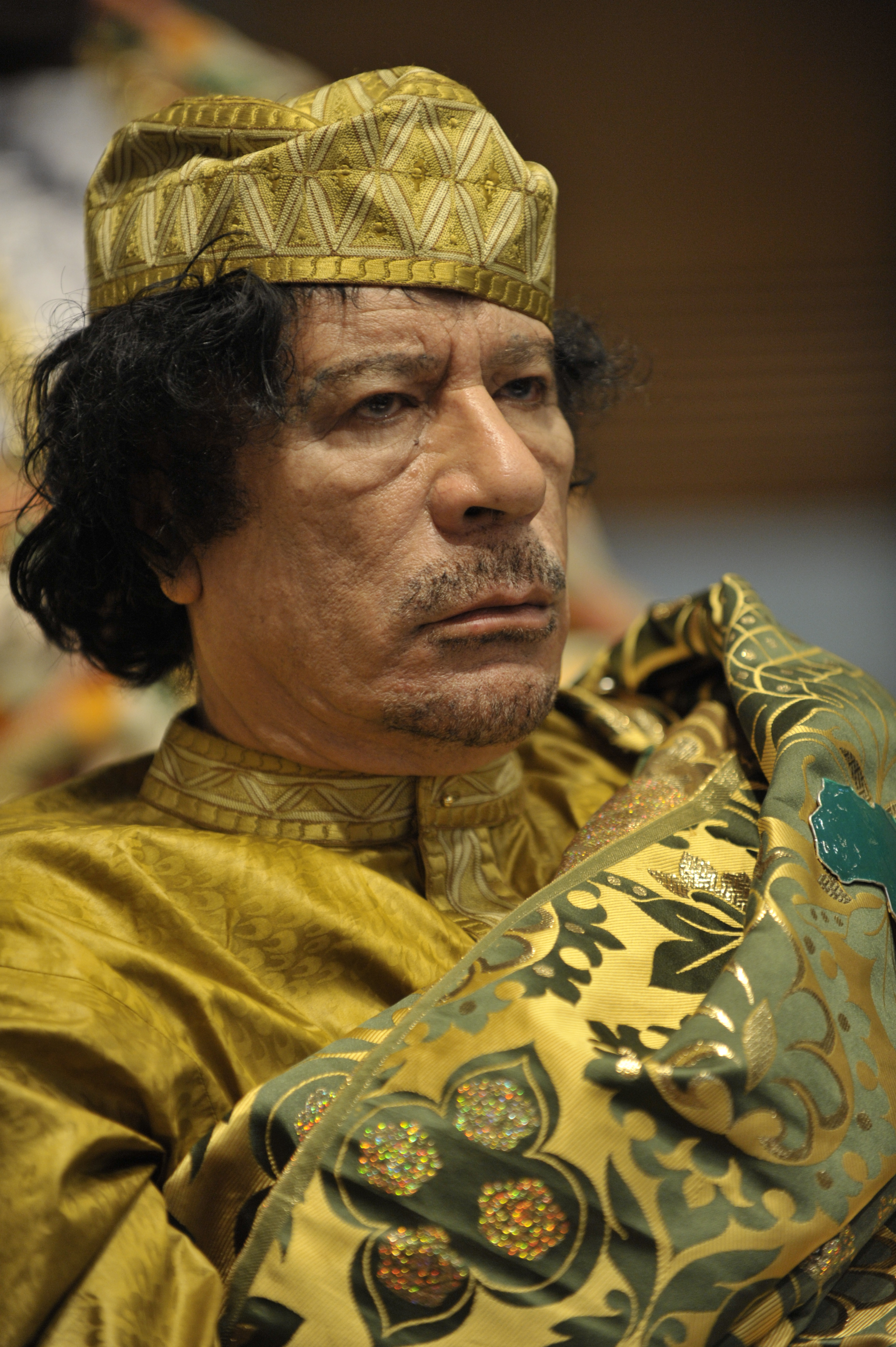
- Only office holder Muammar Gaddafi; 2 March 1979 – 20 October 2011
- Style: His Excellency
- Type: Head of state (de facto); Head of government (de facto)
- Residence: Bab al-Azizia, Tripoli
- Constituting instrument: Declaration on the Establishment of the Authority of the People
- Formation: 2 March 1979; 47 years ago
- Abolished: 20 October 2011; 14 years ago (Killing of Gaddafi)

The Brotherly Leader and Guide of the Revolution of the Great Socialist People's Libyan Arab Jamahiriya (Arabic: الأخ القائد ومرشد الثورة الجماهرية العربية الليبية الشعبية الإشتراكية العظمى) was a title held by former Libyan leader Muammar Gaddafi, who claimed to be merely a symbolic figurehead of the country's official governance structure. However, critics long described him as a dictator, referring to his position as the de facto former political office, despite the Libyan state's denial of him holding any power.

== History ==
After the coup d'état on 1 September 1969, in which King Idris I was deposed, Libya was governed by the Revolutionary Command Council (RCC) headed by Gaddafi. On 2 March 1977, after the adoption of the Declaration on the Establishment of the Authority of the People, the RCC was abolished and the supreme power passed into the hands of the General People's Congress. Gaddafi then became Secretary-General of the General People's Congress.

On 2 March 1979, Gaddafi renounced all public functions and was designated the "Leader" (Qāʾid) of the Libyan state and was accorded the honorifics "Guide of the First of September Great Revolution of the Socialist People's Libyan Arab Jamahiriya" or "Brotherly Leader and Guide of the Revolution" in government statements and the official press.

On 9 March 1990, the General People's Congress adopted a resolution, the Declaration of Revolutionary Legitimacy, which declared that Gaddafi had absolute legitimacy and legal authority over Libya's people and national institutions because of his role in leading the coup in 1969. This came after he asked the Basic People's Congresses to give him institutional legitimacy. The resolution made any orders issued by Gaddafi, such as directives and resolutions, legally binding and required them to be followed without question. It also designated Gaddafi as the "supreme leader". In effect, this resolution confirmed Gaddafi's role as the de facto head of state and the ultimate authority in the country. As well as being the de facto head of state, Gaddafi became the de facto head of government, leaving him with absolute power in Libya. Despite these changes, the Libyan state continued to claim that Gaddafi had no power as he still had no official government position.

Although Gaddafi's title as "Brotherly Leader and Guide of the Revolution" was officially used only from 1979, it is often applied for the whole period of Gaddafi's rule. Although Gaddafi had no official government function from 1979, it was understood that he exercised near-absolute control over the government and the country. His 42 years in power prior to the First Libyan Civil War in 2011 have made him the fifth longest-ruling non-royal national leader since 1900, as well as the longest-ruling Arab leader.

Although ousted from Tripoli at the end of August 2011, Gaddafi retained this de facto position as leader of the Pro-Gaddafi forces, until his defeat and killing by the Anti-Gaddafi forces in the Battle of Sirte on 20 October 2011.

== Political system of Libya under Gaddafi ==
The Great Socialist People's Libyan Arab Jamahiriya was formally managed on the basis of the political ideology set out in The Green Book. The ideology was based on the idea of direct democracy, and direct decision-making of all citizens on all political matters. Across the country there were the basic people's congresses, which were considered the original holders of sovereignty. These included the composition of its adult citizens both men and women. Of their managerial and executive bodies formed the municipal people's congresses and committees, and then the General People's Congress (legislative body) and the General People's Committee (executive body).

Gaddafi rejected the parliamentary representation of the people or by elected representatives, as the General People's Congress was seen as a coordinating body that brought together all the popular congresses and committees, and not elected members who made decisions on behalf of the people. All laws were approved by the basic people's congresses, and then finally adopted by the General People's Congress.

== Succession proposals ==
One of Gaddafi's plans was passing of the country’s leadership on to his son, Saif al-Islam, and the plan’s potential ramifications; the second is the political line adopted by the latter, and the internal and external roles he has played. Saif al-Islam was portrayed as the leader of the reform movement in contrast with the "conservatives" represented by the regime’s old guard, in particular the Revolutionary Committees.

== List ==
No.	Portrait	Name (born–died)	Term of office			Political party
No.	Portrait	Name (born–died)	Took office	Left office	Time in office	Political party
1		Muammar Gaddafi (1942–2011)	1 September 1969	20 October 2011	42 years, 49 days	Military
1		Muammar Gaddafi (1942–2011)	1 September 1969	20 October 2011	42 years, 49 days	Libyan Arab Socialist Union
1		Muammar Gaddafi (1942–2011)	1 September 1969	20 October 2011	42 years, 49 days	Independent

== See also ==
- Paramount leader
- Supreme Leader (North Korean title)
