= Jamahiriya =

Jamahiriya (Arabic: جماهيرية jamāhīriyyah) is an Arabic word that is difficult to translate but is most commonly expressed in English as "State of the masses" or "Peopledom".

The noun is a neologism coined by Muammar Gaddafi in 1977 based on جُمْهُورِيَّة (jumhūriyya, “republic”), by changing the first element, جُمْهُور (jumhūr, “public”), to its plural form, جَمَاهِير (jamāhīr, “the masses”) It may also refer to:

- a concept in the Political philosophy of Muammar Gaddafi
- the Great Socialist People's Libyan Arab Jamahiriya ruled by Gaddafi (1977–2011)
- a Savage Republic album, see Jamahiriya Democratique et Populaire de Sauvage

== See also ==
- History of Libya under Muammar Gaddafi
- Libyan civil war (2011)
- Libyan Jamahiriya Broadcasting Corporation was the name of Libyan state television
