= Libyan Revolution =

Libyan Revolution may refer to:

- 1969 Libyan revolution
- Cultural Revolution in Libya, during approximately 1973 to 1977
- Libyan crisis (2011–present)
- Libyan civil war (2011)
