= People's Hall, Tripoli =

Large former government building in Libya

Coordinates: 32.8797°N 13.1520°E

People's Hall
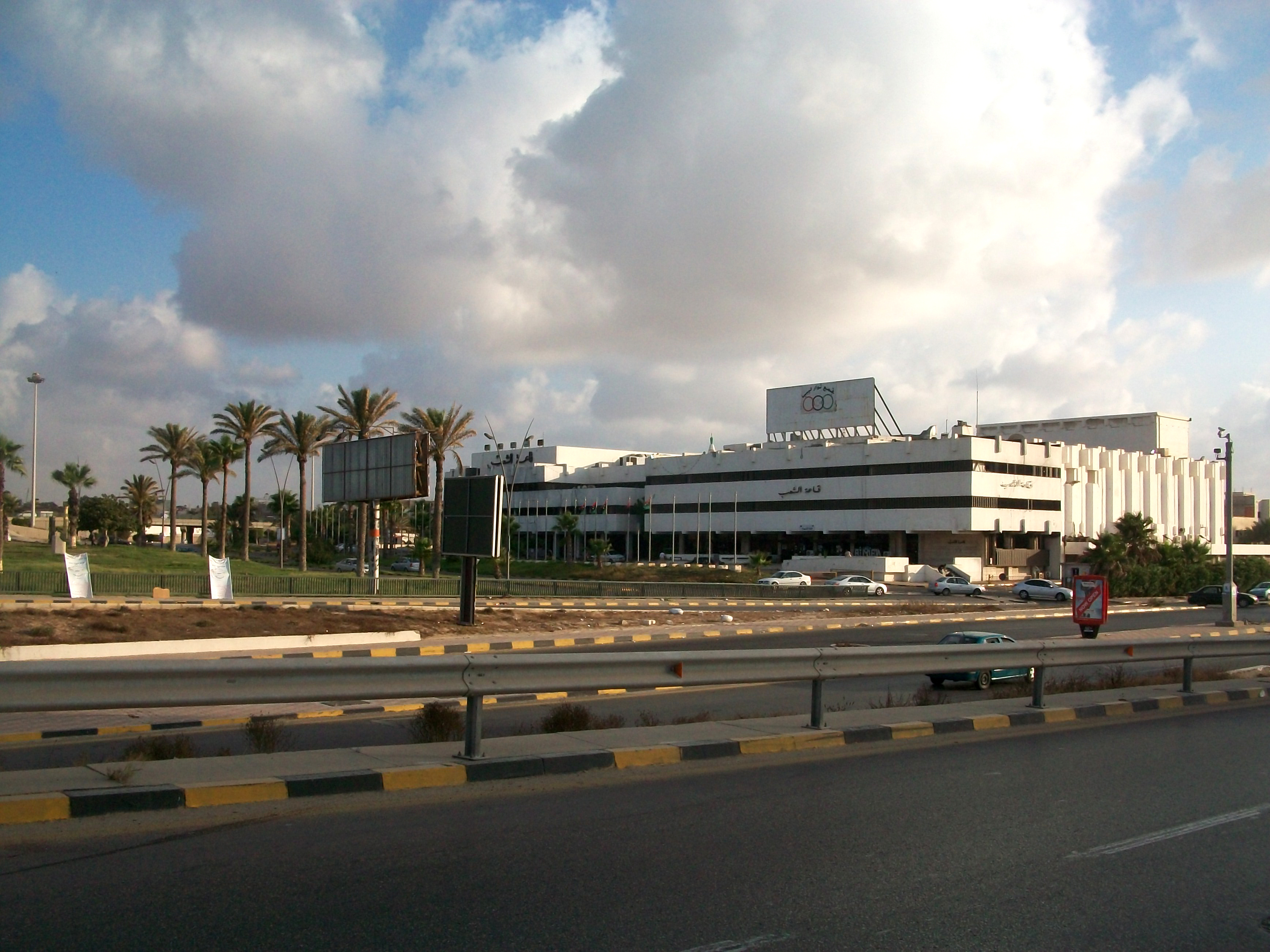
- The Peoples Hall in Tripoli after its disuse as a government building, 2012.
- Interactive map of the People's Hall area

General information
- Location: Tripoli, Libya
- Owner: Government of Libya

The People's Hall was a large government building in Tripoli, Libya, constructed in the 1970s/80s. It was the meeting place of the Libyan General People's Congress. It was normally closed to the general public.

The People's Hall was burned by demonstrators on 21 February 2011, during the First Libyan Civil War. It was reignited and burned out, amongst the other fires at Tripoli police stations, the justice ministry at Martyrs' Square, and the Shaabia headquarters, on 22 February 2011.

The hall was taken over by militia commander Haithem Tajouri of the Tripoli Revolutionaries Brigade in March 2016. It was subsequently abandoned and used by gangs as a drink and drugs den. It has been set on fire several times including on 13 April 2017.
