= Third International Theory =

Theory of governance proposed by Muammar Gaddafi

The Third International Theory (Arabic: النظرية العالمية الثالثة), also known as the Third Universal Theory and informally as Gaddafism, was the style of government proposed by Muammar Gaddafi on 15 April 1973 in his Zuwara speech, on which his government, the Great Socialist People's Libyan Arab Jamahiriya, was officially based. It combined elements of Arab nationalism, Islamism, Nasserism, anti-imperialism, Islamic socialism, left-wing populism, African nationalism, pan-Africanism, pan-Arabism, and direct democracy. Gaddafi further drew from Islamic fundamentalism; he opposed formal instruction in the meaning of the Qur'an as blasphemous and argued that Muslims had strayed too far from God and the Qur'an. However, Gaddafi's regime has been described as Islamist, rather than fundamentalist, for he opposed Salafism, and many Islamic fundamentalists were imprisoned during his rule.

It has similarities with the system of Yugoslav socialist self-management in Titoist Yugoslavia during the 1960s, 1970s and 1980s as developed by Edvard Kardelj. It was also inspired in part by the Little Red Book of Mao Zedong and the Three Worlds Theory. It was proposed by Gaddafi as an alternative to capitalism and Marxism–Leninism for Third World countries, based on the fact that both of these ideologies had been proven invalid.

The Higher Council for National Guidance was created to disseminate and implement this theory, and it found partial realization in Libya, a self-proclaimed utopian model state. The fall of Gaddafi and his assassination in 2011 led to the disestablishment of his system and its replacement by the National Transitional Council.

== Background ==
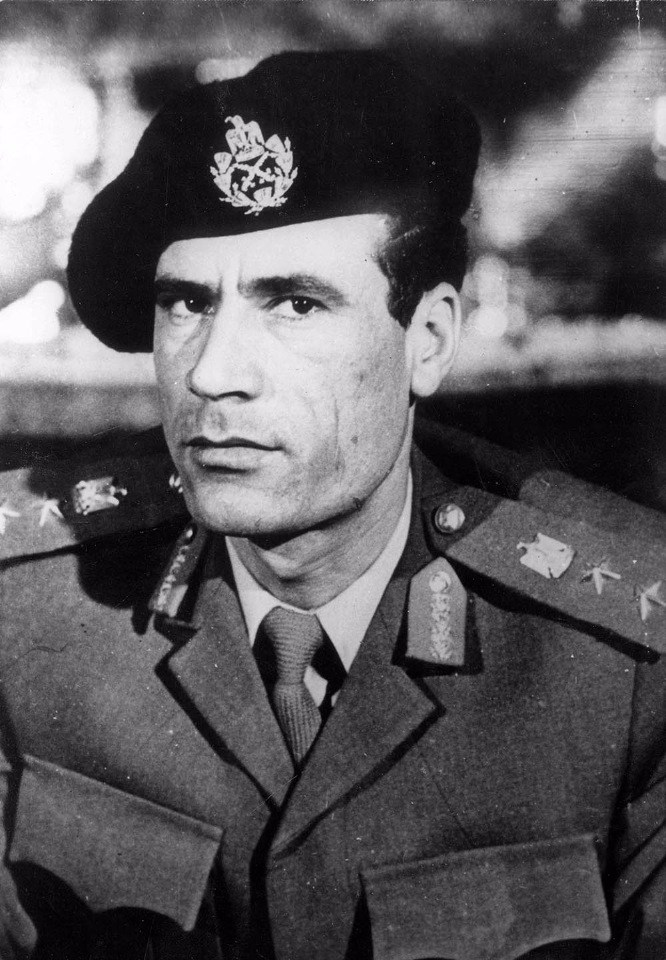
Muammar Gaddafi in 1972

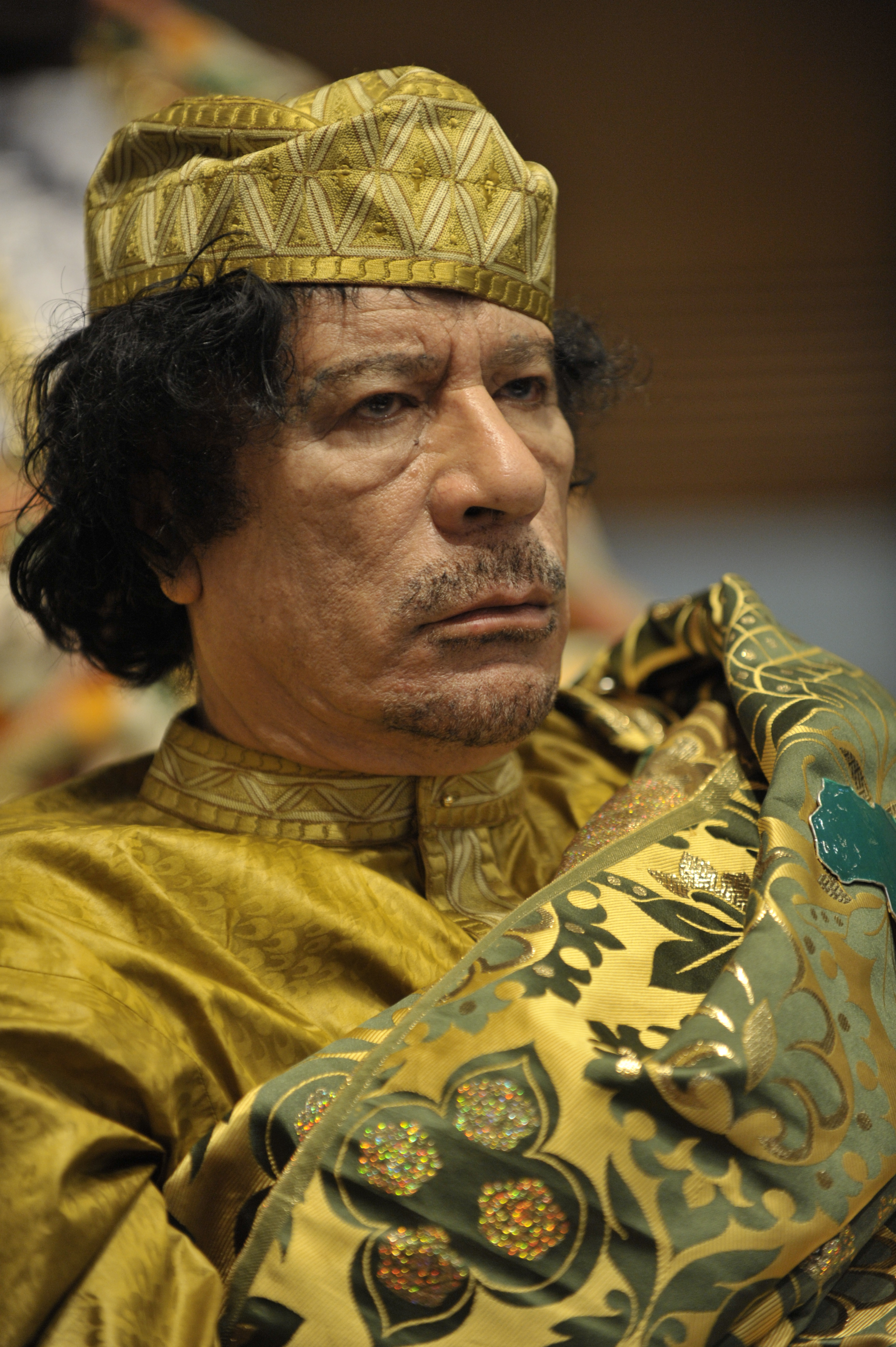
Muammar Gaddafi, author of the Third International Theory, at an African Union summit in 2009

Key provisions of the Third International Theory are outlined in The Green Book (published from 1976 to 1979). It is a system of views which criticizes European-style democracy and Soviet Marxism in detail.

=== Intellectual and political context ===
In the 1960s and 1970s, in the countries of the Arab-Muslim East, various theories of "national brands of socialism", named "Islamic socialism", became widespread. This socialism was based on the principles of nationalism, religion and equality, and its ideas inspired a number of revolutions, popular uprisings and coups in the Arab world. Similarly, in Libya, on 1 September 1969 a group of Libyan army officers belonging to the Movement of Free Officers, Unionists, and Socialists overthrew the monarchy and proclaimed the Libyan Arab Republic. The supreme power was temporarily relegated to the Revolutionary Command Council (RCC), headed by 27-year-old Colonel Muammar Gaddafi.

The anti-imperialist orientation of the Libyan revolution manifested itself clearly in the first months of the new regime. On 7 October 1969, at the 24th Session of the UN General Assembly, the Permanent Representative of Libya announced its intention to eliminate all foreign bases on Libyan territory.

Following this, the Libyan leadership informed the ambassadors of the United States and Britain that it was terminating the respective agreements. Almost at the same time an offensive began against the position of foreign capital in the economy.

The first results and the nearest tasks of the Libyan revolution were fixed in a public statement on 11 December 1969, a Provisional Constitutional Declaration. Islam was declared the official state religion. It was proclaimed that one of the main goals of the revolution was the building of a form of socialism based on "religion, morality and patriotism". Gaddafi and his companions intended to achieve this through "social justice, high levels of production, the elimination of all forms of exploitation and the equitable distribution of national wealth".

The Revolutionary Command Council was to function as the centre of the political organization of society, with the right to appoint cabinet ministers, to declare war and enter into contracts, to issue decrees with the force of law, and to handle key aspects of internal affairs and foreign policy. Chairman of the IBS, Gaddafi was appointed head of the Libyan Arab Republic.

In 1973, Gaddafi organized the Arab Socialist Union, which became the sole legal political organization in the country. In 1977 the General People's Congress, representing numerous national committees, adopted a decree (the "Sabha Declaration") on the establishment of a "regime of people's power" (the so-called 'direct popular democracy') in Libya, and the country was renamed the Socialist People's Libyan Arab Jamahiriya. The Revolutionary Command Council was also renamed and transformed into the General Secretariat of the Congress. In practice, the Arab Socialist Union then merged with the apparatus of the General People's Congress. The people elected into the General Secretariat of the General People's Congress were Gaddafi (General Secretary) and four of his closest associates — Major Abdessalam Jalloud, and generals Abu-Bakr Yunis Jabr, Mustafa al-Harrubi and Huveyldi al-Hmeydi.

Two years later, the five leaders resigned from public office and were replaced by professional managers. From then until his death, Gaddafi officially held the title of the Leader of the Libyan Revolution and the group of the five leaders is named "the Revolutionary Leadership". Furthermore, a hierarchy of Revolutionary Committees was established with the purpose of implementing the policies of the Revolutionary Leadership within the system of the People's Congresses.

== Doctrine ==
The official ideological doctrine is the Third International Theory, described in Gaddafi's "Green Book" (1976–1979). Copies of the "Green Book" were already on sale in Libyan bookstores in many languages prior to the revolution.

The book is a collection of quotes of the Libyan leader, divided into three parts and covering the following vital aspects of existence:

1. Solving the problem of Democracy (People Power);
2. Solving the problem of the economy (Socialism);
3. The public aspect of the "Third International Theory."

=== People Power ===
The first part of the "Green Book" is "Solving the problem of democracy: The Authority of the People". This political aspect of the Third International Theory, published in January 1976, rejects traditional forms of democracy such as parliament, political parties, and referendums, and outlines the basic principles of direct popular democracy based on the people's congresses and people's committees. The book argues that representative democracy is in fact nothing but a kind of dictatorship.

According to the "Green Book", the winner in the struggle for power is always an instrument of government — an individual, party, class; and the loser is always the people, and thus, it is not true democracy. The political struggle often leads to the rise to power of an instrument of government which represents a minority, and that through legal democratic means. Thus, all existing political regimes falsify genuine democracy and are dictatorships.

Parliamentarism, according to Gaddafi, is a perverse solution to the problem of democracy. A Parliament can not speak on behalf of the people, because democracy means the rule of the people, not of those who act on its behalf. Methods of electing the parliament can not be considered democratic, because the masses become completely disconnected from the Members of Parliament. The MPs monopolize the power of the masses and the right to decide their business for them. Parliament, in fact, represents not the people, but the party that won the elections. In fact, the people are used by the political forces in the struggle for power. The system of elected parliaments is a demagogic system because votes can be bought and manipulated, that is, parliamentary representation is a fraud. In general, the theory of representative government is, Gaddafi argues, an outdated practice that was invented by philosophers and thinkers at the time when the common folk were ordered about like livestock by their rulers.

The party, according to the "Green Book", is a modern tool of dictatorial rule — it is the power of a part over the whole. Parties are established by groups of people to act in their interests, or to impose their views on the public and to establish their ideology on it. The number of parties in a system does not alter the substance of the matter. Moreover, the more numerous the parties are, the more intensive is the power struggle between them, which in turn undermines the programmes geared to benefit the entire society. The interests of society and of its development are sacrificed for the sake of the partisan struggle for power.

In addition, parties may be corrupt and can be bribed from the outside and inside. The 'opposition' is not an organ of control over the activities of the people of the ruling party, it only waits for the right moment to take the place of the ruling party at the trough of power. Control is in the hands of the party in power (through Parliament), and power in the hands of the party in control.

Gaddafi compares party and clan. In his view, in the struggle for power, the party is no different from a power struggle between tribes and clans. Both types of struggle are portrayed as having a negative and disintegrating effect on society.

The referendum is also described as a falsification of democracy. Voters can say only "yes" or "no." The theory states that everyone should be able to justify their desire and the cause of their approval or disapproval. Therefore, to be completely democratic, it is necessary to create such an instrument of government, which would be identical to the entire nation as a whole, rather than to a representative body acting on its behalf.

==== People's congresses ====
Gaddafi offers to create a special hierarchical structure of people's congresses and committees, resulting in a system where "management becomes popular, control becomes popular, and the old definition of democracy as 'control of people over the government' is replaced by its new definition as 'the people's control over itself'."

"The only means of people's democracy are the people's congresses. Any other system of government is undemocratic. All existing world systems of government are undemocratic, if they do not adhere to this method of governance. People's congresses are the ultimate goal of the movement of peoples on the path to democracy. People's congresses and people's committees represent the end result of the peoples' struggle for democracy."

In the proposed Jamahiriya, the entire population is divided into People's Congresses, which elect the People's Committees, which in turn form the second round of the People's Congresses, which elect the State Committees, which fulfil the function of state administration. Issues considered at the People's Congresses are finally formulated each year at the General People's Congress. Accordingly, the outcomes and decisions of the General Congress are brought to the lower levels in the reverse order.

At the General People's Congress, which gathers together the governing bodies of the people's congresses, the people's committees, the trade unions and the professional associations, the most important public issues are discussed and the definitive legislative decisions are made.

In the first part of the "Green Book" Gaddafi also lays out his views on freedom of speech. According to him, "a human being, as an individual, should have the freedom of expression, and even if mad, s/he should have the right to freely express his/her madness." Man, as a legal entity, is also free to express themselves as such. In the first case the man represents only himself, in the second—only a group of individuals forming a legal entity.

"Society is composed of many individuals and entities. Therefore, if an individual is insane, that does not mean that the rest of society are mad, too. Press is a method of expression of society, not a single person or entity. A newspaper, if owned by an individual, expresses only the views of its owner. The assertion that it represents public opinion is untenable and has no basis, because in reality it expresses the views of an individual, and from the point of view of genuine democracy it is unacceptable that an individual should own the print media and other types of media that provide the public with information."

=== Socialism ===
The second part of the "Green Book"—"The solution of the economic problem (Socialism)"—sets out the economic aspect of the Third International Theory (published on 2 February 1978).

This part criticizes wage labor, comparing it with slavery, and proclaims the right of an employee to any product produced by them. A person must work in accordance with their powers and must also be able to satisfy their needs, and all surplus should be directed to the accumulation of social wealth. The accumulation of surplus by one person reduces [the possibility of satisfaction of] the needs of another person, and is therefore unacceptable.

In September 1977, Gaddafi put forward as the basis of economic life the principle of "self-government in the economy". In line with this principle, it was envisaged that enterprises should be transferred to the collective management of those who work there. The slogan "Partners, not employees" was given theoretical justification in the second part of the Green Book, and in November of the same year this idea began to be implemented in some industrial enterprises.

During the development of his economic ideas, Gaddafi put forward another slogan: "Real Estate—property of its inhabitant." That is, a person living in a house was an owner, not a tenant. In May 1978, a law was passed, whereby renting residential premises was prohibited, and tenants became owners of their rental apartments and houses.

With the slogan "Partners, not employees", workers and employees under the leadership of the People's Committees took over businesses and institutions in not only production but also trade, as well as the various services of service. Former owners got compensation and the opportunity to participate in the management of these enterprises, but in "equal partnership with the producers." This campaign was described as a "people's capture" and was a form of elimination of private ownership of business by upper and middle classes.

The functioning of the political system of the "Jamahiriya" in the field and especially in production was hampered both by the opposition of the upper classes and by the insufficient preparations for the activities conducted and the inability of the new management staff to manage the economy. This led to discontent and unrest among the population against the political and economic innovations of the Libyan leadership. Some of the Muslim clergy accused Gaddafi of "deviation from the Qur'an."

In response, authorities made serious efforts at limiting the influence of the clergy. Gaddafi made a televised public examination of the pro-opposition clergy members on the subject of the Qur'an. According to Gaddafi, he proved that they were unable to answer his questions, and he subsequently used that as a reason to deprive some of them of the right to conduct religious services.

The final result of the economic reforms in the Jamahiriya was meant to be "the achievement of a new socialist society", a stage at which profit and money disappear from society and it becomes fully productive, and production fully meets the material needs of all members of society. At this stage, profits and money were meant to disappear by themselves.

Thanks to successful oil exploration starting in 1961, Libya has become a prosperous state with the highest per capita income in Africa. In 1970, oil prices on world markets increased considerably, leading to the accumulation of substantial funds in Libya, as a supplier of oil to western countries. Government revenues from oil exports were to be used to finance urban development and the creation of a modern system of social welfare.

At the same time, to improve Libya's international prestige, huge sums were spent on creating a well-equipped modern army. In the Middle East and North Africa, Libya served as a carrier of ideas of Arab nationalism and as an uncompromising enemy of Israel and the United States. The sharp drop in oil prices in mid-1980s and the UN sanctions for its connection to the Lockerbie bombings (in 1992) led to a significant weakening of Libya. On 12 September 2003, the UN Security Council lifted the sanctions imposed in 1992.

=== Public aspect of the theory ===
The third part—the "Public aspect of the Third International Theory" was published on 1 June 1979. This addressed many aspects of life, including women, the education system, sports, and merging the world's languages. In this part a global vision of proper co-existence is presented. The fundamental principles come down to this: every nation should have its own religion, and should recognize the importance of a continuous social chain ("the family—the tribe—the nation—the world," "from the small to the great").

According to the "Green Book": "if the national spirit is stronger than the religious spirit, the struggle between different nations, which used to be united in one religion, is amplified, and each of those nations achieves independence, returning to the social structure that is characteristic of it." "A tribe is the same as a family, but one that has increased due to the increased growth of offspring, that is, the tribe is a big family. The Nation is a tribe, but a tribe that has grown as a result of increased offspring, i.e., a nation is a large tribe. The World is a nation but a nation divided into many nations as a result of population growth, i.e., the world is a great nation."

"The tribe is the natural social protection of the individual, ensuring his social needs." In Libya, according to accepted social tradition, the tribe collectively provides redemption of its members by collectively paying ransom for them, paying their fines, avenging them and collectively defending them.

A special place in the Green Book is reserved for women, their physical build and social role in society:

- First – "A woman is a human, just like a man is";
- Second – a woman is an individual of the female sex, whereas a man is an individual of the male sex. In view of this, a woman "has a regular disease in the form of monthly bleeding, but if this does not happen, then she has become pregnant."
- Third – the tendency to deny a woman her natural role of mother and replace her with nurseries is the beginning of a denial of humane, human society and of its transformation into a biological society, living an artificial life (as a result of this, in Libya, there were no kindergartens, and a woman, once she has given birth to a child, was not allowed to work again).
- Fourth – males in the world of plants and animals are by nature strong and rough, whereas women in the world of plants and animals in the world and the world's peoples are by nature beautiful and tender.

Accordingly, Gaddafi concluded that "human rights are for everyone—men and women, but the responsibilities are not equal."

The issue of language is also addressed: "People will remain underdeveloped, until there is a common language." However, this question can be resolved only through a merging of languages in a series of stages, over several generations, provided that over time these generations lose their inherited traits: "the sensory perceptions, tastes and temperament of their fathers and grandfathers."

The Green Book also has an original take on sports and spectacles:

- "Sport can only be individual, like a prayer";
- "Mass sport is a social need of the human beings, so it is unacceptable from either a sporting or a democratic point of view to 'subcontract' sport to others [professionals]";
- "Collective sport is the business of the masses";
- "Stadiums exist in order to restrict the masses from using sports fields";
- "Boxing and various kinds of wrestling suggest that humanity has not completely rid itself of the vestiges of barbarism."

This approach to sport led to most of Libya's stadiums being open only during military parades, and any kind of wrestling being strictly prohibited.

==== Relationship with Islam ====
In the absence of specific prescriptions for the transformation of society in the so-called "Islamic socialism", Gaddafi constantly made revisions to this theory. Before the "Green Book", Islam was considered one of the ideological sources of official ideology in Libya, but the third part of this book, which appeared in the summer of 1979, did not assess its truthfulness on the basis of the precepts of Islam.

On the contrary, "the truth" of Islamic provisions themselves was evaluated in terms of their compatibility with the theory. It was declared that the driving force of history was national and social struggle. At the same time, as Gaddafi specified, "if we were to restrict ourselves to the support of Muslims only, that would be an example of bigotry and selfishness: True Islam is the one that defends the weak, even if they are not Muslims".

In the subsequent explanations and comments on the "Green Book", many of its provisions underwent significant revisions while still remaining the basic catechism of ideology in Libya.

== Implementation in Libya ==
The theory was partially implemented in Libya. In March 1977, the "Declaration of Sabha" was declared, and the republic was transformed into a Jamahiriya (the Socialist People's Libyan Arab Jamahiriya). Those forms of exploitative private ownership were abolished (whereas private family businesses in the service sector were preserved).

With the advent of globalization and the information revolution, Gaddafi slightly modified his theory by introducing a thesis about the era of large spaces in which the nation-state is becoming inviable. The word "Jamahiriya" (Arabic: جماهيرية jamāhīriyyah, approximately "[state] of the masses") is an Arabic neologism. It is the feminine 'nisba adjective formed from the term "Jamahir" (masses). It echoes the Arabic term for "Republic", "Jumhuriyah" (formally the feminine nisba adjective from Jumhur "people"). They both come from the root J-M-H.

Gaddafi's "Jamahiriya" form of government was supposed to be different from both the monarchy and the republic, hence the name of "Third" International Theory.

=== Politics and government of Libya under Gaddafi ===
Under Gaddafi, Libya was governed by a military regime professing the idea of Arab nationalism, socialism, and Islam. The highest state authority was the General People's Congress (GPC), consisting of representatives of People's Committees. In practice, the GPC had the functions of a parliament. Its members were elected at local and regional levels, although some were assigned by Gaddafi personally. Gaddafi also appointed his ministers from among the members of the GPC. While Gaddafi did not hold any official posts, he remained the leading political figure in Libya.

Islam was the state religion of Libya, but the influence of the Muslim clergy was limited. Direct democracy was declared in the country, and oil revenues made it possible to maintain a high standard of living for the Libyan population. The presence of foreign capital was reduced, and the state owned the enterprises in the large and medium industries.

The basis of justice was the Quran. A hierarchical system of courts conducted judicial proceedings. Small lawsuits were considered in the Magistrates' Courts. Next came the Courts of the First Stage, the Appellate Courts and the Supreme Court.

The official main principle of government in Libya was: "Power, wealth and weapons — in the hands of the people."

=== Modification of the theory in Libya ===
The transformation of Libyan society into Jamahiriya was accompanied by many zigzags and went more slowly than Gaddafi intended. The system that he created may have aroused the Libyan people to political activism, but, as he had to admit, "popular participation in government was not complete".

Therefore, at the session of the General People's Congress held in the town of Sirte on 18 November 1992, it was decided to set up a new political structure: this was to initiate the country's transition to the supreme level of democracy — "a Model Jamahiriya". It was about creating, instead of the primary public meetings (People's Congresses), 1500 communes, which are self-guided mini-states within a state, each with full authority within its district, including the allocation of budgetary funds.

The need to reorganize the former political system, as explained by Gaddafi, was primarily due to the fact that it had "failed to ensure genuine democracy because of the complexity of the structure, which created a gap between the masses and the leadership, and was characterized by excessive centralization."

As a whole, after 1992, the Jamahiriya pursued a policy of building an "Islamic socialist society".

== See also ==
- Gaddafi loyalism
- Great Socialist People's Libyan Arab Jamahiriya (1977–2011)
- The Green Book (Libya)
- Arab street – Term for public opinion in the Arab world
