= General People's Committee =

Executive branch of the government of the Libyan Arab Jamahiriya

The General People's Committee (Arabic: اللجنة الشعبية العامة, romanized: al-lajna ash-sha'biyya al-'āmma), often abbreviated as the GPCO, was the executive branch of the government of Libya, during the existence of Muammar Gaddafi's Libyan Arab Jamahiriya. It served as the intermediary between the masses and government leadership and was composed of the Secretary-General and twenty secretaries of some 600 local Basic People's Congresses (BPC), GPCO members were elected by the country's parliament, the General People's Congress (GPC), and had no fixed terms.

The GPCO was the rough equivalent of the cabinet in many republics, constitutional democracies, and constitutional monarchies, as well as the Executive Board of the Libya's own subsequent National Transitional Council, which ultimately replaced the jamahiriya as Libya's dominant force in 2011, as a result of the First Libyan Civil War. The GPCO was scattered by the fall of Tripoli, with some of its members fleeing into exile, some becoming prisoners of war, and some remaining in Libya.

== History ==
In March 1977, the General People's Congress (GPC) adopted the "Declaration on the Establishment of the Authority of the People" and proclaimed the Libyan Arab Jamahiriya. The people exercise authority through the people's committees, people's congresses, professional associations, and the GPC. Elections were direct, and all voting consisted of a show of hands or a division into yea-or-nay camps. Suffrage and committee or congress membership were open to all Libyan citizens eighteen years of age or older in good legal and political standing.

In theory, the residents of each zone elected their own people's committee. Similarly, the residents of each branch municipality elected their own Basic People's Congress (BPC). The BPC members then elected a chairman and a five-member branch or municipal people's committee. The General People's Congress was made up of the chairmen of the BPC, the branch and municipal people's committees, and representatives of the people's committees for unions, professional associations and student unions. The GPCO replaced the former Council of Ministers, its members being referred to as secretaries rather than ministers. Legislative and executive authority was vested in the GPC. This body, however, delegated most important authority to its general secretary and General Secretariat and to the GPCO. Muammar Gaddafi, as general secretary of the GPC, remained primary policy maker. As a part of a decentralisation program undertaken during September 1988, all GPCO secretariats, except those responsible for foreign policy and information, were relocated away from Tripoli. In early 1993 it was announced that the Secretariat for Foreign Liaison and International Cooperation was to be moved to Ra's Lanuf.

== Competences of GPCO ==
1. Implement laws and resolutions issued by the GPC ( مؤتمر الشعب العام ) formulated by the BPC ( المؤتمرات شعبية اساسية ).
2. Prepare project proposals and budgets for the General Planning Council.
3. Present plans for public projects to the General Planning Council.
4. Propose bills, as well as other topics presented to the BPCs.
5. Implement and manage strategic projects.
6. Monitor BPC committees, institutions and public companies ensuring accordance to BPC decisions.
7. Supervise the Great Manmade River project and other investments.
8. Issue decisions on organizational structures for the government.
9. Encourage foreign investment in Libya and monitor investments abroad.
10. Adopt curriculum.
11. Issue regulations governing contract work financed from the budget.
12. Issue and regulate laws as stipulated by the jurisdiction.
13. Establish, consolidate and organize institutions, companies and public works.
14. Operational cost of the GPC or BPC.

== Responsibilities ==
1. Implement laws and resolutions issued by the BPCs drafted in the GPC.
2. Invitation to GPCO meetings and monitor implementation.
3. Propose bills and other topics presented to the GPCO for approval.
4. Conclude treaties, conventions and the international loans (ratified by the BPC).
5. Adopt minutes for joint committee meetings, and address questions of international cooperation.
6. Name Trustees and BPC members and agencies; public corporations and general assembly members of public companies as determined by executive regulations.
7. Authorize international institutions and public companies contracting with foreign companies.
8. Investigate the popular committees, and punish them in accordance with existing legislation.
9. Work assigned by the GPC, secretariat of the GPCO, or the GPCO for the traditional.

== GPCO Ministries ==
By the end of the Gaddafi era, the General People's Committee consisted of the following sub-agencies, led by a cabinet secretary:

Committee	Equivalent ministry	Website
Secretary of the GPCO	Prime Minister of Libya	www.gpco.gov.ly
Assistant Secretary	Deputy Prime Minister of Libya	
General Committee for Defence	Minister of Defence	
GPCO for Youth and Sports	Minister of Youth and Sports	www.gpcs.gov.ly
GPCO for Foreign Liaison and International Cooperation	Minister of Foreign Affairs	www.foreign.gov.ly
	Minister of Economy, Trade and Investment	
	Minister of Tourism	
GPCO for Culture and Information	Minister of Culture and Information	
GPCO for Justice	Minister of Justice	
GPCO for Finance	Minister of Finance	www.mof.gov.ly
GPCO for Public Security	Minister of Interior	www.almiezan.gov.ly
GPCO for Education	Minister of Higher Education	www.edu.gov.ly
GPCO for Industry and Mines	Minister of Industry and Mines	
GPCO for Agriculture, Livestock and Marine Wealth	Minister of Agriculture, Animal Wealth and Marine Resources	
GPCO for Health and Environment	Minister of Health	
GPCO for Social Affairs	Minister of Social Affairs	
GPCO for Higher Education	Minister of Higher Education	www.higheredu.gov.ly
GPCO for Telecommunications and Transport	Minister of Telecommunications and Transport	www.ctt.gov.ly
GPCO for Electricity, Water Resources and Gas	Minister of Electricity, Water Resources and Gas	
GPCO for Manpower, Training and Employment	Minister of Manpower, Training and Operation	www.smpt.gov.ly
GPCO for Planning	Minister of Planning	wpc.gov.ly

== Notes ==
Notes:
1. Ministers in italics are no longer serving.
2. The GPCO was changed in 2007: Ministers of Tourism and Energy were removed.

== See also ==
- Basic People's Congress (administrative division)
- Basic People's Congress (political)
- Direct democracy
- General People's Congress (Libya)
- Human rights in Libya under Gaddafi
