= Cultural Revolution (Libya) =

1973–1977 political and social movement

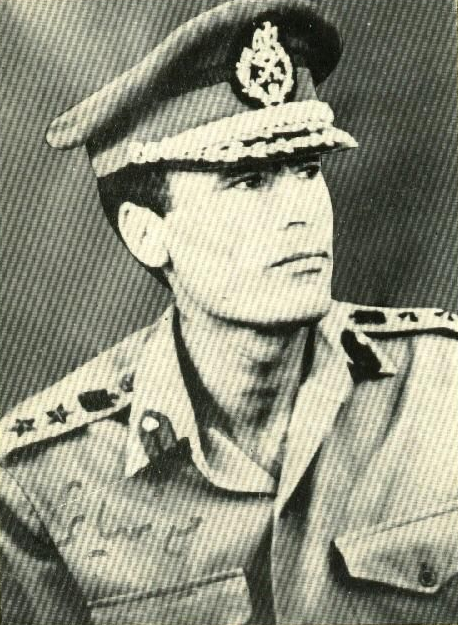
- Gaddafi in 1972
- Duration: April 15, 1973 – March 2, 1977 (3 years and 321 days)
- Location: Libya
- Also known as: People's Revolution; Green Terror
- Motive: Return to Arab and Islamic values and purge the communist, imperialist, atheist and ikhwani elements from the revolution.
- Organized by: Muammar Gaddafi
- Outcome: Islamization of Libyan society; Violent purges in the universities and administrations; Arabization of Libya; Establishment of the Jamahiriya
- Deaths: Exact number not known

The Cultural Revolution (Arabic: الزحف, romanized: al-zahf) (also known as the People's Revolution or the Green Terror) in Libya was a nearly four-year period of political and social change in Libya. It started with Muammar Gaddafi's declaration of a cultural revolution during a speech in Zuwarah on 15 April 1973. This came after increasing tensions between Gaddafi and his colleagues in the Revolutionary Command Council (RCC) had led him to agree to step down. Gaddafi had told the RCC that he would announce his resignation to the people during his Zuwara speech, but he instead surprised them with his declaration of the Cultural Revolution. By the end of the Cultural Revolution period, Gaddafi was the uncontested leader of Libya.

The Cultural Revolution continued to at least September 1974, when the independence of action of the People's Committees was reduced by the national leadership in the Revolutionary Command Council. In a wider sense, it came to its conclusion in the establishment of Gaddafi's "state of the masses" ("jamahiriya") in 1977.

The Cultural Revolution was presented as a period of democratization, a return to Arab and Islamic values and spontaneous popular mobilization against five identified threats to the power of the people: communism, conservatism, capitalism, atheism, and the Muslim Brotherhood (referred to as Ikhwani, based on the Arabic word Brotherhood).

In practice the Cultural Revolution marked the beginning of the sidelining of other Libyan political and religious leaders and the concentration of power in Gaddafi.

== Background ==
Libya's population is based on a traditional Islamic society centred on the mosque and family gatherings. The ruling Italians and their attempt to westernize Libya was not favoured by Libyans. Gaddafi was able to let the Libyan tribes accord him as a leader and not oppose was his promise to keep Libya a traditional Islamic society where his numerous speeches addressing the importance of Islam is what made people like him.

1973 was the fourth year of power for the Revolutionary Command Council (RCC) which had overthrown the monarchy under Gaddafi's leadership and had created the Libyan Arab Republic. Although the coup had been met with widespread public approval, the RCC members had limited education and no government experience. The country experienced mismanagement, confusion, disorder and economic difficulties, including widespread unemployment.

Although he was the recognized leader of the ruling RCC, Gaddafi's difficult and petulant behaviour, widening ambition, increasing hubris, and increasingly authoritarian approach towards his colleagues had led to tensions which culminated in the RCC demanding his resignation. Gaddafi refused on the basis that the RCC (which had come to power, including Gaddafi, in a coup) had not been elected, and therefore it could not ask for or accept his resignation. When RCC members responded that Gaddafi was unelected with them, he agreed to make a speech in Zuwara announcing his resignation to the people, rather than the RCC. Instead he used the speech to declare the beginning of a cultural revolution, and used the rapid mass mobilization of his supporters to establish his uncontested leadership over the country.

Indigenous Berbers were persecuted as Gaddafi viewed them as a threat to his view of Libya as an Arab country. The teaching of Berber languages were outlawed and speaking them were also outlawed. People could not register under Berber names and giving such names was also barred. People were forced to take Arabic names as well as Arabic surnames.

It was during the early stages of the Cultural Revolution that Libya led Arab nations in the 1973 oil crisis as the first to impose an oil embargo on the United States.

== The five points ==
The "remaking of Libyan society" contained in Gaddafi's ideological visions began to be put into practice formally beginning in 1973 with a so-called cultural or popular revolution. This revolution was designed to combat bureaucratic inefficiency, lack of public interest and participation in the subnational governmental system, and problems of national political coordination.

The Cultural Revolution was organized around an official five point program:

- The annulment of all existing laws
- The repression of communism , conservatism, fascism, atheism, the Muslim Brotherhood, and capitalism
- The distribution of arms to the people
- Administrative reform and a purge of the administration
- The promotion of Islamic thought and rejection of un-Islamic ideas from other countries and cultures

These points were listed in the 1973 speech in the city of Zuwarah by Gaddafi.

== Formation of People's Committees ==
People's Committees were established throughout the country to introduce or enforce the Cultural Revolution and to control the revolution from below.

In an attempt to instill revolutionary fervor into his compatriots and to involve large numbers of them in political affairs, Gaddafi urged them to challenge traditional authority and to take over and run government organs themselves. The instrument for doing this was the People's Committees. Within a few months, such committees were found all across Libya. There were two types of People's Committees – functional and geographical – and these institutions eventually became responsible for local and regional administration.

Functional People's Committees were established in such widely divergent organizations as universities, private business firms, government bureaucracies, and the broadcast media. Geographical People's Committees were formed at the governorate, municipal, and zone (lowest) levels. Seats on the People's Committees at the zone level were filled by direct popular election; members so elected could then be selected for service at higher levels. By mid-1973 estimates of the number of People's Committees ranged above 2,000.

In the scope of their administrative and regulatory tasks and the method of their members' selection, the People's Committees purportedly embodied the concept of direct democracy that Gaddafi propounded in the first volume of The Green Book, which appeared in 1976. The same concept lay behind proposals to create a new political structure composed of "People's Congresses." The centerpiece of the new system was the General People's Congress (GPC), a national representative body intended to replace the RCC.

== Suppression of dissent ==
One of the major effects of the empowerment of the People's Committees was the persecution of enemies of the regime. The Committees acted as local organs of the national government. They dismissed many civil servants and state employees from their posts. At the same time, agents from East Germany's Stasi helped develop services which engaged in more brutal suppression of regime opponents. Stasi assistance came despite the openly stated intention to suppress both communism and atheism, because Gaddafi's stated policy was that he was a socialist, anti-imperialist, anti-capitalist and anti-American. Purges of 1973 initially concentrated on university students in Tripoli and Benghazi and on Libyan army officers.

== Religious aspects ==
One aim of the Cultural Revolution was the replacement of the existing legal system with Sharia. The University of Benghazi law faculty was entrusted with this task. The traditional religious establishment initially supported this. However Gaddafi soon created controversy among the religious leadership. He both disputed the need for Islamic jurists and scholars (ulema) and at the same time declared himself a principal Muslim jurist and scholar (mujtahid). He also abandoned traditional Sunni reliance on collections of hadith and the sunnah in favour of exclusive reference to the qur'an as interpreted by himself. Gaddafi was considered by many Islamic jurists to have thus rejected the whole body of sharia jurisprudence in favor of a process of interpretation (ijtihad) concentrated on his own opinions.

== Reduction of People's Committee power ==
The Revolutionary Command Council never lost control of the situation, and freely reversed decisions of People's Committees when they wished. However, in September 1974, the RCC officially condemned what they termed excesses by the People's Committees and held new elections to replace them. From this point the People's Committees showed less initiative in suppressing dissent in their local areas, and relied more on informing on dissenters to the array of state security agencies that developed over the years.

== See also ==
- 1969 Libyan coup d'état
- History of Libya under Muammar Gaddafi
- Human rights violations under Gaddafi's regime
- Muammar Gaddafi
- Politics of Libya under Muammar Gaddafi
- The Green Book
- Third International Theory
- Cultural Revolution
