= Telephone numbers in Libya =

- Country: Libya
- Continent: Africa
- Regulator: Post and Telecommunication Bureau, General People’s Committee
- NSN length: 8,9
- Format: XX XXX XXXX
- Country code: +218
- International access: 00
- Long-distance: 0

The following are the telephone codes in Libya.

== Calling formats ==
To call in Libya, the following format is used:

xxx xxxx Calls within an area code

yyy xxx xxxx Calls inside Libya in city centers

+218 yyy xxx xxxx Calls to a landline from outside Libya

+218 mm xxx xxxx Calls to a mobile from outside Libya

where yyy is the area code (see below), and mm is the mobile provider code (see below).

Codes	Mobile Provider	Example (local)	Example (international)
91,93	AL-MADAR	091 XXX XXXX, 093 XXX XXXX	+218 91 XXX XXXX, +218 93 XXX XXXX
92,94	LIBYANA	092 XXX XXXX, 094 XXX XXXX	+218 92 XXX XXXX, +218 94 XXX XXXX
95	LibyaPhone by LTT	095 XXX XXXX	+218 95 XXX XXXX

== List of area codes in Libya ==
List of area codes
Area/City	Area Code
Abenjawad	54
Abu Issa	274
Abuhadi	551
Agelat	282
Ajailat	282
Al Josh	454
Azizia	272
Bani Walid	322
Ben Gashir	22
Benghazi	61
Benina	63
Bergen	732
Bisher	655
Brak	721
Bugrain	529
Buzayan	425
Dafnia	523
Deriana	625
Derna	81
Edry	723
El Beida	84
Elbayada	684
Elkuwaifia	624
Elmagrun	629
Elmareg	67
Elmaya	279
Ezzaonia	23
Garda	733
Garian	24
Ghadames	484
Ghat	724
Ghrefa	729
Gmines	623
Guassem	423
Gubba	821
Haraua	82
Hashan	271
Hugialin	284
Hun	57
Jaghbub	884
Jalo	657
Jardas	682
Jerdina	627
Jmail	281
Kaalifa	626
Kabaw	481
Kasarahmad	524
Khums	31
Kikla	427
Kofra	652
Kussabat	326
Mamura	277
Massa	852
Matred	275
Misrata	51
Mizda	422
Murzuk	725
Nalut	47
Noflia	555
Ojla	653
Reyana	453
Rujban	452
Sabratha	24
Sebha	71
Seluk	628
Shahat	851
Sidi Sultan Sultan	654
Sidiessaiah	205
Sirt	54
Slenta	854
Sokna	582
Soussa	583
Suk Elkhamis	206
Swajni	224
Taigura	26
Taknes	683
Tarhuna	325
Tawergha	522
Tigi	482
Tolmitha	681
Tomina	685
Traghen	734
Tripoli	21
Tripoli International Airport	22
Ubary	73
Um Laranib	726
Wadi Atba	731
Wadi Jeref	554
Wadi Keam	323
Wodan	581
Yefren	421
Zahra	252
Zawai	23
Zawaya	727
Zawyat Elmahjub	526
Zella	584
Zliten	521
Zuara	25
