= Basic People's Congress (political) =

Smallest unit of government of the Great Socialist People's Libyan Arab Jamahiriya

The Basic People's Congress, or Fundamental Popular Council (Arabic: مؤتمر شعبي أساسي, romanized: Mu'tamar shaʿbi asāsi), was the smallest unit of government in Muammar Gaddafi's Libya. It governed the equivalent of a municipality, and that geographic district was also called a Basic People's Congress.

The congress consisted of every man and woman who had attained the age of majority. The actual congress met at three scheduled meetings per year or as called upon by necessity. The first meeting was usually devoted to a detailed agenda for the next two meetings. At the second meeting, the Basic People's Congress discussed issues relating to the local business, while at the third meeting, seats on committees were filled, representatives elected and policy at the national and international level discussed. Day-to-day management and oversight was provided by the people's committee appointed by the congress. The next political level up was the district congresses and above that was the General People's Congress at the top.

== History ==
The BPCs were established alongside the rest of the Jamahiriya System during the Libyan Cultural Revolution.

In the aftermath of his walkout from the 2004 Arab League Summit, Gaddafi stated that he had hoped that the BPC's would vote on withdrawing Libya from the Arab League permanently.

== See also ==
- Folkmoot
- Primary Assembly (under the French Constitution of 1793)
- Libyan Arab Jamahiriya
