= General People's Congress (Libya) =

Legislative branch of the government of the Libyan Arab Jamahiriya

General People's Congress Arabic: مؤتمر الشعب العام الليبي 'Mu'tammar al-sha'ab al 'âmm

Type
- Type: Unicameral

Structure
- Seats: 2700 members
- Political groups: Non-partisan (2700)

Elections
- Last election: March 2009

Meeting place
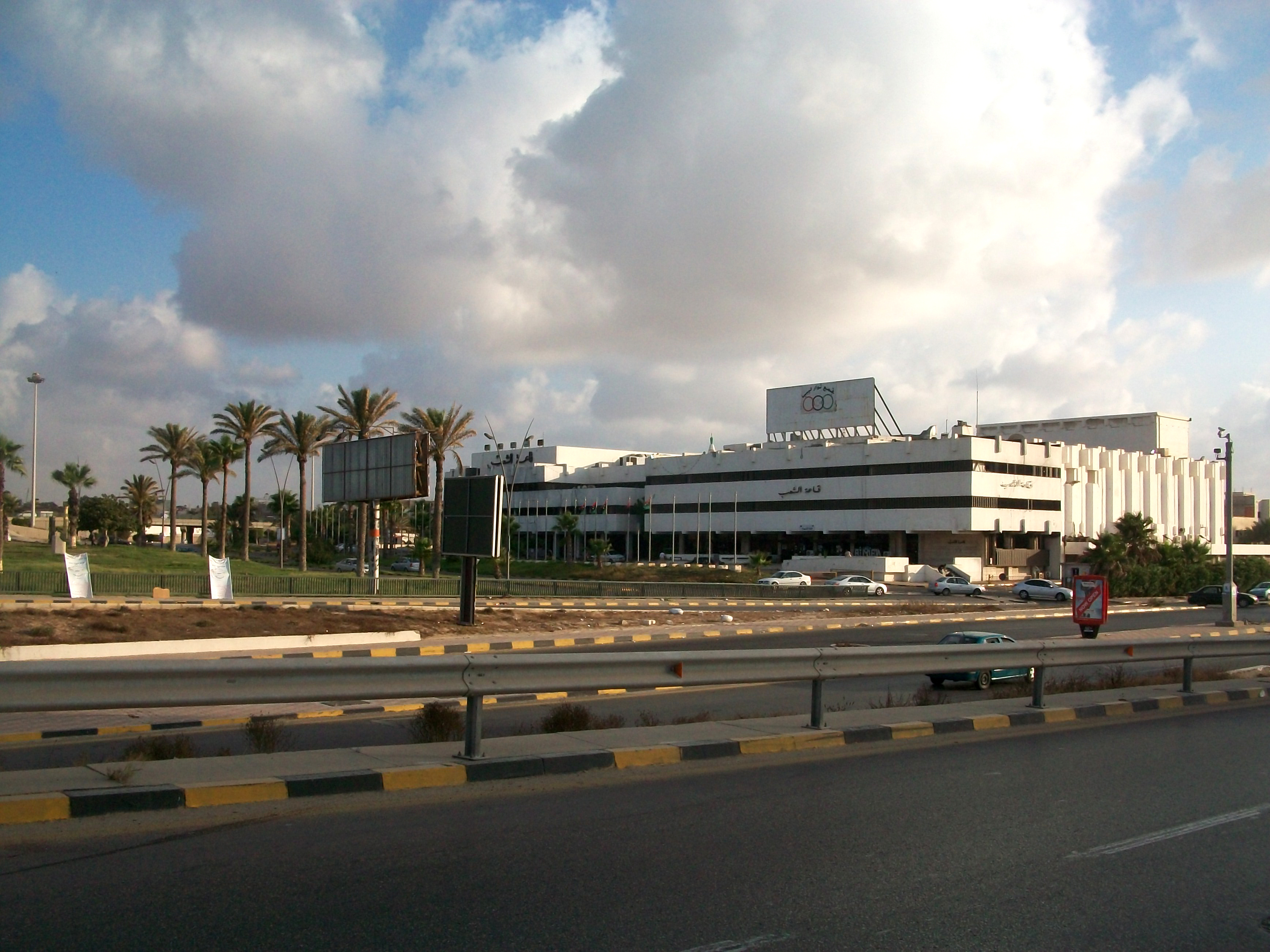
- People's Hall, Tripoli, Libya

The General People's Congress (Arabic: مؤتمر الشعب العام الليبي, Mu'tammar al-sha'ab al 'âmm), often abbreviated as the GPC, was the supreme authority of state power in the Libyan Arab Jamahiriya. Per principle of unified power, all state organs were subordinated to the GPC. It consisted of 2,700 representatives of the Basic People's Congresses (BPC).

The GPC was the legislative forum that interacted with the General People's Committee (GPCO), whose members were secretaries of Libyan ministries. It notionally served as the intermediary between the masses and the leadership and was composed of the secretariats of some 600 local "basic popular congresses." The GPC secretariat and the cabinet secretaries were appointed by the GPC secretary general and confirmed by the annual GPC session. These cabinet secretaries were responsible for the routine operation of their ministries.

== History ==
The body was established in 1977, upon the adoption of the "Declaration on the Establishment of the Authority of the People". It was headed by the Secretary-General of the General People's Congress.

In 2008, Gaddafi proposed that the GPC vote to accept a radical new oil distribution proposal, in which oil revenue generated by Libya would go to Libyan citizens directly. The stated goal of this proposal was to circumnavigate government corruption and free Libyans from a corrupt bureaucracy. However, after much deliberation and debate, the proposal was voted down the following year, and did not go into effect.

The People's Hall in Tripoli, where the Congress met, was set on fire in February 2011, during the First Libyan Civil War.

== See also ==
- Basic People's Congress (administrative division)
- Direct democracy
