= Sport and Citizenship =

European think tank

Association Sport et Citoyenneté (Sport and Citizenship)
- Formation: April 2007
- Legal status: European Association under Belgian and French law
- Purpose: Think, Inform, Advise and Organize
- Headquarters: Angers, France; Brussels, Belgium
- President: Laurent Thieule
- Website: www.sportetcitoyennete.com

Sport and Citizenship was founded in 2007, shortly after the adoption of the European Commission's White Paper on sport. It is the first and only European think tank which works on the analysis of sporting politics and the study of sport's societal impact. Independent and apolitical, Sport and Citizenship is a forum for new thinking and lobbying which aims to put forward the core values of sport in society, in the realm of politics, economics and media issues.

Sport and citizenship advocate the values of common good, independence and expertise.

== Actions ==
=== Subjects ===
In the pursuit of multidisciplinary and transverse reflection, it brings together associations, federations, politicians, sportspeople, and academics to enable an exchange of views and an analysis of policies at both European and national member state levels.

Sport and citizenship think about societal issues and policies linked to sports which evolve through time and according to what is significant for people.

Now it focuses on topics such as gender equity in sports (women’s sports), inclusive sports, sustainable sports, etc.

=== Toward public ===
- The journal : each quarter a bilingual (French-English) scientific journal on sport is published by the think tank exploring an important theme of society. The latest ones covered “preventing sexual abuse and protecting people”, “sport and sustainable development” and “The “métiers pluri’elles” project women’s access to sports professions”
- The roundtables: The association also organizes and takes part in roundtables and conferences which deal with citizenship through sport across Europe: "Conference Sport au féminin" (Conference on Women's sport), "Defending the European Football : ecosystem and tradition" or "Fire+ project conference"
- Special Publications : the think tank also publishes more substantial thematic studies which constitute a more in-depth analysis of a given topic.

=== Toward public authority ===
- Lobbying
- Counsel
- Plea

== Organisation ==
The association operates around two teams divided between Angers and Brussels, a board of directors and a scientific committee. It can also rely on its ambassadors.

=== Board ===
The board is chaired by Laurent Thieule. It provides strategic guidelines for the think tank. Members of the board are personalities whose expertise and authority are recognised in their fields, they are politicians, journalists, professors, sportspersons, etc.

- President: Laurent Thieule, director of the European Committee of the Regions and President of Kraainem FC
- Vice Presidents: Amel Bouzoura, Géraldine Pons and Andrzej Rogulski
- Secretary General : Alexandra Fournier-Bidoz and Nicolas Gyss
- Secretary General for Legal Affairs : Lilia Douihech
- Treasurer : Claire Allard

=== The scientific committee ===
The members of the scientific committee contribute their expertise to the work of the think tank.

- President : Colin Miège
- Co-directors : Alexandre Husting and Julien Zylberstein

Some of the members of the scientific committee:

- Bernard Amsalem, former President of the French Federation of Athletics
- Michaël Attali, Professor at the University of Rennes 2 and President of the French Society of Sports History
- Pascal Bonniface, Founder and Director at the Institute of International and Strategic Relations (IRIS)
- Joël Bouzou, President and Founder at Peace and Sport
- Christian Bromberger, Emeritus Professor of Ethnology at the University of Aix-Marseille
- Philippe Housiaux, Doctor of Law, President of the Wallonia-Brussels Panathlon
- Didier Lehénaff, associate Professor in Physical and Sporting Education, President at SVPlanète, conceiver of the Eco-Games
- Marie-Cécile Naves, Studies Manager of Sport and Citizenship Think Tank, Autor, Political scientist, Director of publication of the Chronik site

=== The team ===
The team around 10 people, managed by Julian Jappert, Director of the Think Tank between Angers and Brussels. Brussels office mainly focuses on European projects affairs.

== Financing ==
"Sport and citizenship" has two sources of funding: grants and patrons.

The European Commission is a significant partner in the management of European projects.
