= Mansour Mohamed El-Kikhia =

Libyan politician (born 1936)

- Born: November 28, 1936 (age 89)
- Occupations: Academic and politician
- Known for: Former member of the Libyan National Transitional Council

Mansour Mohamed El-Kikhia (Arabic: منصور محمد الكيخيا) (born 28 November 1936) is a Libyan academic and politician. El-Kikhia is a former member of the Libyan National Transitional Council as a city representative for Benghazi. He is an alumnus of the University of Provence, from where he received a PhD in Population Geography with Distinction in 1986. El-Kikhia is well known in Benghazi for his role with the Public Scout and Girl Guide Movement of Libya; he was awarded the Bronze Wolf, the only distinction of the World Organization of the Scout Movement in 1981.
