= Bernard Sellato =

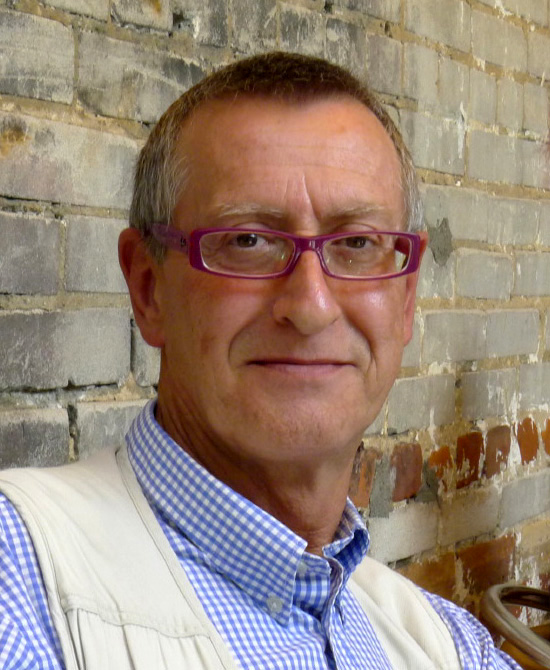
- Born: 1951 (age 74–75)
- Education: M.Sc. in Geology (Nancy); Ph.D. in Anthropology (Paris)
- Occupation: Anthropologist
- Writing career
- Language: French, English, Indonesian, Spanish
- Notable awards: Jeanne Cuisinier Book Prize (1989); European Multimedia Award (1998); Borneo Research Council Medal (2004)

Bernard Sellato was born in 1951, holds an M.Sc. in Geology from ENSG (Ecole Nationale Supérieure de Géologie) in Nancy, France, and a Ph.D. in Anthropology from the EHESS (Ecole des Hautes Etudes en Sciences Sociales) in Paris. He spent many years in Kalimantan (the Indonesian portion of Borneo) researching history, languages and cultures.

After his first trip to Borneo in 1973–75, Sellato spent many years traveling, mostly by canoe and on foot, and researching linguistics and anthropology among former forest nomads and slash-and-burn farmers in the Müller Mountain Range and other parts of Kalimantan. He was adopted by an Aoheng family under the name Suling Dirung.

In 1988, Sellato was commissioned by the petroleum company Elf Aquitaine to write a coffee-table art book on Borneo, which took a year of research and writing – the resulting work, the bilingual illustrated Hornbill and Dragon was published in 1989, with a second edition published in 1992. His latest edited book, “Plaited Arts from the Borneo Rainforest”, commissioned by Total E&P Indonésie, was published in 2012.

In addition to writing six books himself, Sellato has also edited or co-edited six more books and contributed a number of articles about Borneo to books and journals. He is a former director of the Institute for Research on Southeast Asia (CNRS and Universite de Provence) in Marseilles, France and was the editor of the bilingual journal “Moussons: Social Science Research on Southeast Asia” from 1999 to 2008.

Sellato is a well-respected expert in his field – according to Simon Strickland's review of Innermost Borneo: Studies in Dayak Cultures (2002) in the Journal of the Royal Anthropological Institute, Sellato's studies have contributed significantly to knowledge of the nomadic tribes of Borneo, despite the ethnographic and historical complexities of the field. In 2004, Bernard Sellato was awarded the Borneo Research Council Medal for his “extensive contributions to the study of Borneo societies and cultures” over 30 years.

== Selected works ==
- Sellato, Bernard (1989). Nomades et sédentarisation à Bornéo. Histoire économique et sociale. Paris: Editions de l’EHESS. ISBN 271320917X.
- Sellato, Bernard (1989). Naga Dan Burung Enggang. Hornbill and Dragon. Kalimantan, Sarawak, Sabah, Brunei. Jakarta: Elf Aquitaine. ISBN 9789798112003.
- Sellato, Bernard (1992). Hornbill and Dragon. Arts and Culture of Borneo. Singapore: ESun Tree. ISBN 9810027133.
- Sellato, Bernard (1994). Nomads of the Borneo Rainforest. Honolulu: University of Hawaii Press. ISBN 9780585249926.
- Sellato, Bernard (2001). Forest, resources and people in Bulungan: Elements for a history of settlement, trade, and social dynamics in Borneo, 1880–2000. Bogor (Indonesia): CIFOR (Center for International Forestry Research). ISBN 9798764765.
- Sellato, Bernard (2002). Innermost Borneo. Singapore: Singapore University Press. ISBN 2914936028.
- Eghenter, Cristina; Sellato, Bernard; Devung, G. Simon, eds. (2003). Social Science Research and Conservation Management in the Interior of Borneo. Bogor (Indonesia): CIFOR (Center for International Forestry Research). ISBN 9793361026.
- Le Roux, P.; Sellato, B.; Ivanoff, J., eds. (2008) [2004]. Poids et mesures en Asie du Sud-Est. Systèmes métrologiques et sociétés. Weights and Measures in Southeast Asia. Metrological Systems and Societies. CNRS-IRSEA (Marseilles) and EFEO (Paris). ISBN 9782855396460.
- Le Roux, P.; Sellato, B., eds. (2008) [2004]. Les Messagers divins. Aspects esthétiques et symboliques des oiseaux en Asie du Sud-Est. Divine Messengers. Bird Aesthetics and Symbolism in Southeast Asia. Paris: SevenOrients & Connaissances et Savoirs. ISBN 2753900590.
- Sercombe, Peter; Sellato, Bernard, eds. (2007). Beyond the Green Myth: Hunter-Gatherers of Borneo in the Twenty-First Century. Copenhagen: NIAS (Nordic Institute of Asian Studies) Press. ISBN 9788791114847.
- Sellato, Bernard, ed. (2012). Plaited Arts from the Borneo Rainforest. Lontar Foundation (Jakarta) and NUS Press (Singapore). ISBN 9786029144048.
