= Public Scout and Girl Guide Movement =

National Scouting organization of Libya

- Country: Libya
- Founded: 1954
- Membership: 18,000
- Affiliation: World Association of Girl Guides and Girl Scouts, World Organization of the Scout Movement
- Website http://www.scoutsarena.com

The Public Scout and Girl Guide Movement (Arabic: الحركة العامة للكشافة والمرشدات) is the national Scouting organization of Libya. It was founded in 1954, and became a member of the World Organization of the Scout Movement in 1958 and of the World Association of Girl Guides and Girl Scouts in 1981. The coeducational Public Scout and Girl Guide Movement has about 18,500 members (13,698 Scouts and 4,766 Guides) as of 2004.

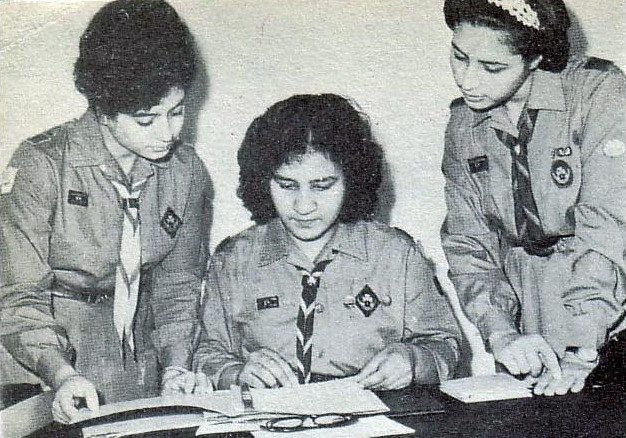

In 1966, Ali Khalifa el-Zaidi (علي خليفة الزائدي) was awarded the Bronze Wolf, the only distinction of the World Organization of the Scout Movement, awarded by the World Scout Committee for exceptional services to world Scouting. Other recipients include Dr. Mansour Mohamed El-Kikhia (د. منصور الكيخيا) in 1981 and in 1983, Dr. Mohamed H. Fhema (د. محمد افحيمه).

The Scout Motto is Kun Musta'idan or كن مستعداً, translating as Be Prepared in Arabic, though the local variant is Wa a'eddou or و أعدوا. The noun for a single Scout is Kashaf or كشاف in Arabic.

Libyan Boy Scouts helping in the social services in Benghazi during the Libyan civil war

Scouts and Guides have a unified headquarters for planning and coordination of policies, but their activities are separate. There is strong Guide/Scout cooperation in planning training courses, youth program, seminars and hosting international activities. Jamborees, leader training courses, seminars and conferences are held throughout the year on the sub-provincial, national and international levels.

The organization has adopted relevant programs in the fields of conservation, Scouting with the handicapped, child health and desert Scouting.

When Muammar Gaddafi was ruler of Libya, Libyan Scouts were active in the African Region as well as the Arab Region.

The membership badge of the Public Scout and Girl Guide Movement incorporates a palm tree and other agricultural produce.

The Public Scout and Girl Guide Movement escaped the ban on almost any form of independent organisation, when Muammar Gaddafi was ruler of Libya, because of its non-political stance and because Gaddafi was briefly a Scout while growing up in the southern town of Sabha. However, in the Libyan Civil War some Scouts acted as front-line support for the anti-Gaddafi forces.
