= Khadījah Jahamī =

Libyan writer and radio broadcaster

Khadījah Muhammad Abdullah Al-Jahamī
- خديجة الجهمي
- Born: March 15, 1921; Benghazi, Italian Cyrenaica
- Died: August 11, 1996 (aged 75)
- Occupations: Broadcaster; writer; lyricist; feminist activist

Khadījah Muhammad Abdullah Al-Jahamī (Arabic: خديجة محمد عبد الله الجهمي; 15 March 1921 – 11 August 1996), also known as Bint al-Watan, was a Libyan writer and radio broadcaster who is considered one of the pioneers of advocating for women's rights since the Italian colonial period in Libya.

== Early life ==
Al-Jahamī was born in Benghazi on 15 March 1921. Her father was the poet Muhammad Abdullah al-Jahmi, who worked as a typesetter for the newspaper Barid Barqa that the Italian colonial government published. Her father encouraged her to attend school from the age of seven, where she was taught in Italian, as well as Arabic. As a young child, she wrote to Benito Mussolini criticising the Italian colonization of Libya.

During the Second World War, Al-Jahamī volunteered as a nurse. In 1947 she joined the Princess School in Benghazi, where she studied until August 1952. She then left for Egypt to study at Abdeen School in Cairo, which she graduated from in 1956.

== Career ==
After al-Jahamī's graduation, she returned to Benghazi in October 1956 to join work as a broadcaster at Radio Benghazi. She became the second female Libyan broadcaster, after Hamida Abu Amer. She later moved to Tripoli to continue her journalism. She was sent on a 100-day training course where she met Tunisian President Habib Bourguiba. Through her work with "The Audible Theatre" programme, she performed many radio dramas, as well as presenting dozens of radio programmes, many of which focussed on health, children and Arab artists, amongst many other themes. These dramas were vital in enabling women's issues in particular to be brought to a wider audience.

Al-Jahamī was also a writer beyond radio broadcasting, who wrote several books, poetry and song lyrics, which have been performed by many Libyan singers. The most notable song she wrote was Nour Al-Ain, which was performed by Muhammad Marchan.

As a magazine publisher and editor she established Al-Bayt (the Women's Magazine) on 5 January 1964, was the owner and also its editor at one point. She founded the first children's magazine In Libya, Al-Amal, and was appointed its editor on 1 October 1974. The magazine encouraged young people to be trained as journalists.

Within unionism and politics, she was a key figure in the establishment of the General Women's Union in Libya, which was the amalgamation of several feminist groups in 1970. She became its president in 1972. In 1977 the organization was re-named as the Jamahiriya Women's Federation.

Al-Jahamī died on 11 August 1996 and was buried in her hometown of Benghazi.

== Awards ==
- Al-Fateh Prize for Literature and the Arts (1996) – honouring her work as a lyricist and her life's cultural impact.
- Mirzan Award from the College of Law – women's rights activism.

== Legacy ==
In 2019 Abdul Rahman Shalgam, Libya's former foreign minister, wrote that al-Jahamī "launched a quiet social revolution" through her writing and broadcasting, despite opposition from conservative sections of Libyan society. Part of her broadcasting appeal was due to her "soft eastern Libyan accent", as well as the confidential and welcoming tone she used to appeal to all sections of society.

Several Libyan institutions are named after her, including schools and libraries, as well as the Women’s Library in Tripoli.

Two biographies of al-Jahamī have been published. In 2006 Amina Hussein Bin Amer's book Khadija El-Jahmi: Half a Century of Creativity (خديجة الجهمي: نصف قرن من الإبداع) was published. In the same year Asmāʼ Muṣṭafá Usṭá's volume I am Khadija El-Jahmi (أنا خديجة الجهمي) also came out.
