= Maydan al Shajara =

Square in Benghazi, Libya

Coordinates: 32°6′54″N 20°3′45″E

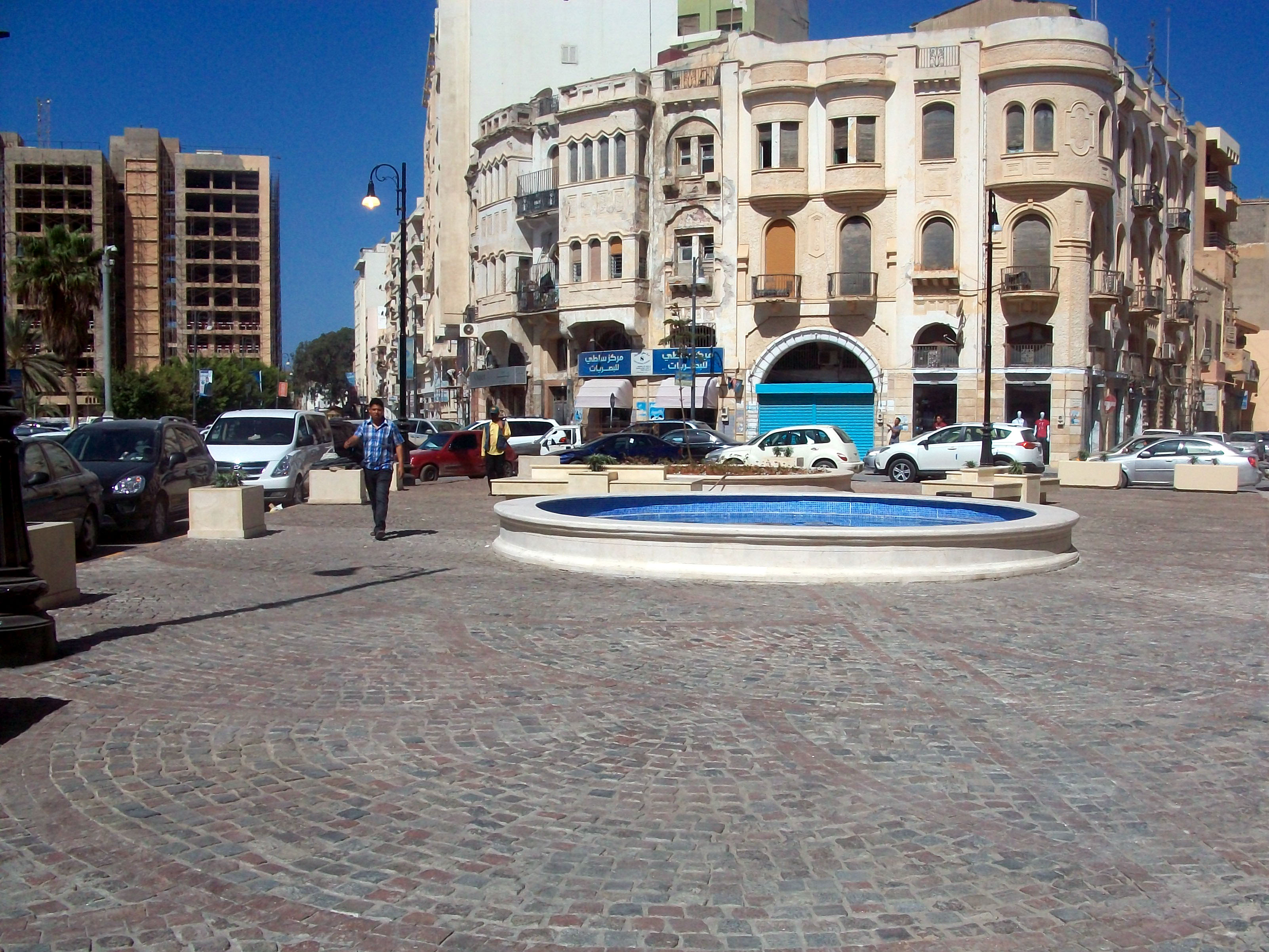
Granite cobblestones in Maydan al-Shajara.

Maydan al-Shajara (Arabic: ميدان الشجرة; English: The Tree Square), is a major town square in Benghazi, the second largest city in Libya. A large native Norfolk pine tree was located in the center of the square, giving it its name. The square is located in the center of Benghazi, linking two primary roads, Gamal Abdel al-Nasser Street and 'Amr ibn al-'As Street.

== Features ==
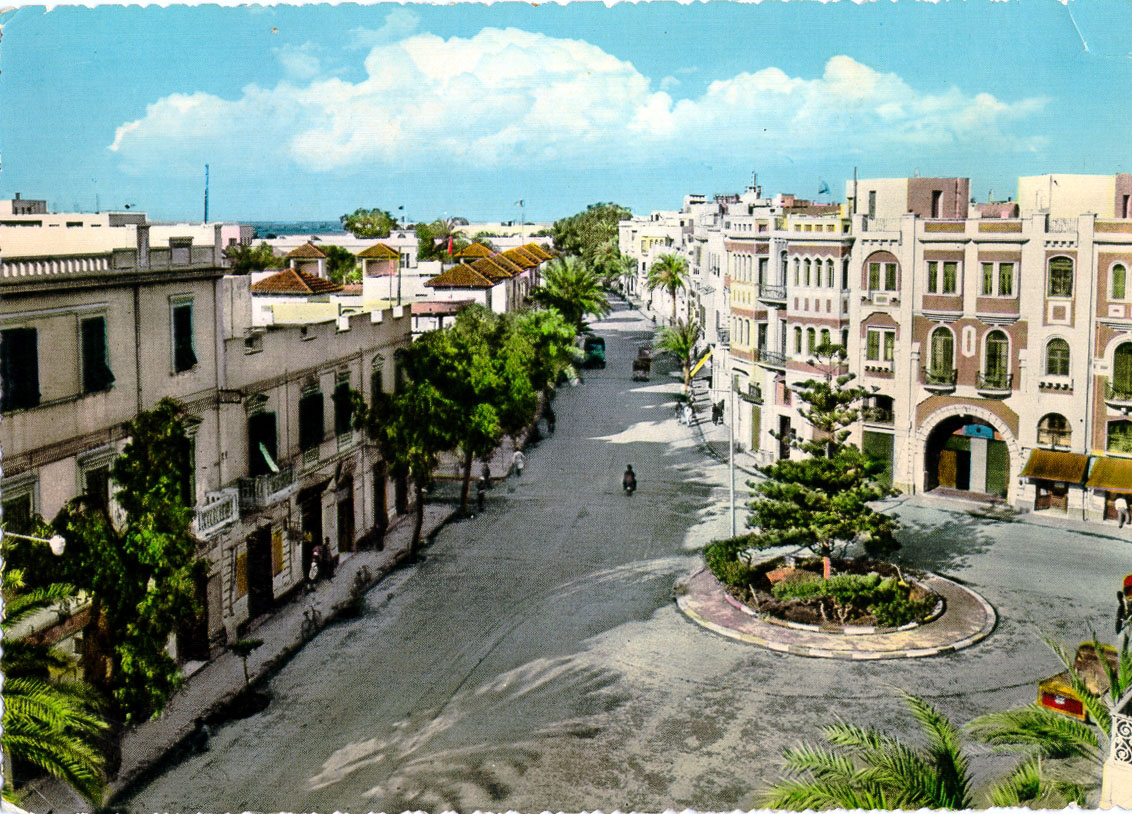
Maydan al-Shajara, Benghazi, in 1964

The National Oil Corporation and Wahda Bank buildings overlook the square, with several other buildings of historic architectural distinction. Nearby are three government administration buildings. Maydan al-Shajara is the site of public events, celebrations, and demonstrations.

== Libyan civil war ==
Maydan al-Shajara became a major gathering place for protesters during the Libyan Civil War. Government forces had used water cannons, and reportedly machine-guns and heavy weapons on crowds, in attempts to disperse demonstrators in the early days. By 20 February 2011, Benghazi and Maydan al-Shajara came under the control of the opposition government.

== See also ==
- History of Benghazi
