= Libyan International Medical University =

Private university in Benghazi, Libya

Libyan International University
- الجامعة الليبية الدولية
- The university emblem
- Former names: Libyan International Medical University
- Type: Private
- Established: 2007; 19 years ago
- President: Dr. Mohammed Saad Ambarak
- Students: 2,740+
- Location: Benghazi, Libya; 32.067958°N 20.085081°E
- Campus: 7.5 acres (30,000 m^{2})
- Website: http://www.limu.edu.ly/

The Libyan International University (Arabic: الجامعة الليبية الدولية) is a for-profit private university established in Benghazi, Libya, with the purpose of teaching medicine. It is the first private medical university in Libya.

The Libyan Ministry of Health granted LIMU students the privilege of training at the national health care centers and hospitals.

== History ==
The university began its activity in 2007 by opening the faculties of Medicine, Oral and Dental Medicine, Pharmacy and Basic Medical Sciences, expanding afterwards to include several different faculties, such as the faculties of Information Technology, Business Administration and Engineering. This versatility in the offered programs lead to the name being changed from "Libyan International Medical University" to simply "Libyan International University". It, however, retained the acronym "LIMU", maintaining its legacy.

== Instructional model ==
LIMU implemented the problem-based learning (PBL)model of instruction. LIMU is the only medical school in Libya using this approach, and one of a handful of universities in the Arab world. PBL is believed to be more effective than conventional pedagogical models at promoting integration of concepts and increasing students' skills with patients.
