= Benghazi Zoo =

Coordinates: 32°4′57″N 20°5′44″E

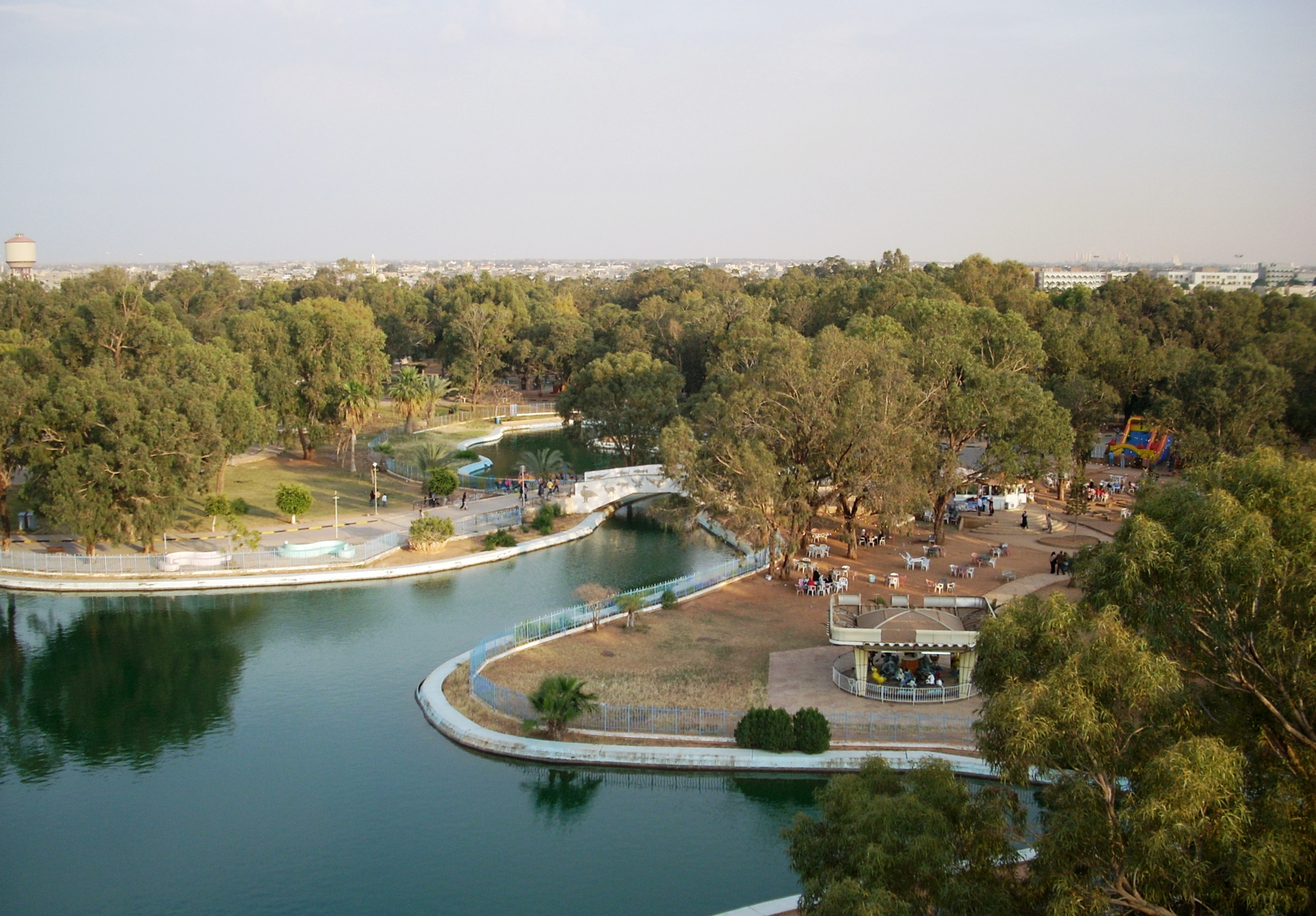
- Benghazi Zoo
- Interactive map of Benghazi Zoo
- Date opened: 1956
- Location: Benghazi, Libya

Benghazi Zoo (Arabic: منتزه بنغازي) or Al Fuwayhat (est. 1956) is a zoo and tourist park in the city of Benghazi, Libya. In 1991, Italian firm Cairtieri Trieste signed a $2 million contract to supply a low draught boat named Al-Berka to give tourist excursions on the lagoon inside the park.
