= Marie-Cécile Naves =

French sociologist and political scientist

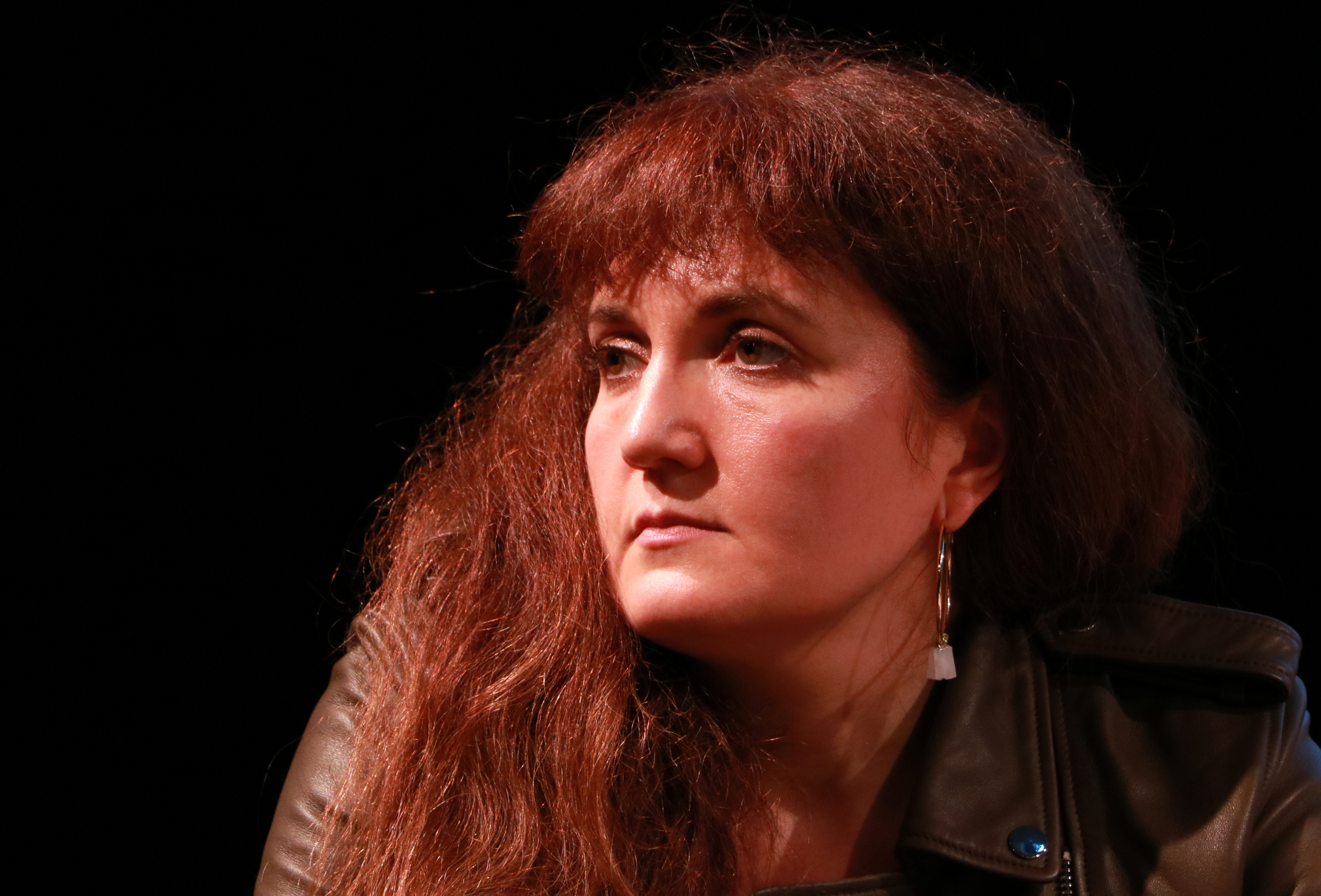
- Education: Paris Dauphine University (doctorate)
- Occupations: political scientist, sociologist
- Website: https://mariececilenaves.com

Marie-Cécile Naves is a French sociologist and political scientist who is the director of research at Institut de relations internationales et stratégiques (IRIS). A specialist in the United States, she also speaks on the themes of sports and gender.

== Biography ==
Originally from Tulle, Naves completed a thesis in political science entitled Sociologie d'une controverse politico-intellectuelle : production, diffusion et réception, dans l'espace intellectuel français, de la théorie de la Fin de l'histoire de Francis Fukuyama (Production, diffusion and reception, in the French intellectual space, of Francis Fukuyama's theory of the End of History) at the University of Paris-Dauphine, under the supervision of John Crowley. She published her dissertation entitled La fin des néoconservateurs ? (The End of the Neoconservatives?) in 2009, and then did postdoctoral research in communication sciences at the Fondation Maison des sciences de l'homme.

== Areas of work ==
=== Teaching ===
From 1999 to 2010, Naves taught at the university and at Sciences Po Lille.

In 2010, she was recruited as a project manager at the Centre d'Analyse Stratégique, now France Stratégie, and she is an advisor to the Conférence des Présidents d'Université.

=== Gender and stereotypes ===
Marie-Cécile Naves and Vanessa Wisnia-Weill submitted a report in 2014 entitled "Fighting against girl-boy stereotypes. An issue of equality and co-education from childhood" to the Minister of Women's Rights Najat Vallaud-Belkacem. The document includes 30 public policy proposals, on the socialization of childhood and adolescence.

The various studies and columns published by Naves concern the hypersexualization of the public space, the marginalization of women's sports, international women's rights and gender equality.

=== Sport and citizenship ===
Marie-Cécile Naves is a member of the scientific committee of the think tank Sport and Citizenship. In 2017, she published Le pouvoir du sport (The Power of Sport) with Julian Jappert, an inventory of European practices on sport for all, focusing on social cohesion, discrimination, or its economic model.

In her research on normative stereotypes, Naves addresses the minority position of women in high-level sport: "Indeed, sport constitutes the leisure activity where gender stereotypes are the most present, because it is historically a privileged place of construction of virility and because the instrumentalization of biology is very strong there."

=== United States ===
In 2015, Naves published Le nouveau visage des droites américaines - Les obsessions morales, raciales et fiscales des États-Unis (The New Face of the American Right - America's Moral, Racial and Fiscal Obsessions). In it, she analyzes the post-Obama United States. In 2016, she published Trump, The Populist Shockwave, in which she discusses Donald Trump's background and strategy of action in relation to the populist and identity-based wave that brought him to power. She devoted a second book to Donald Trump in 2018, Trump, la revanche de l'homme blanc (Trump, the revenge of the white man), in which she argues that he wants to rehabilitate a model of society based and built on male domination. In 2018, she also published the textbook Géopolitique des Etats-Unis (Geopolitics of the United States).

In 2020, Naves published La démocratie féministe (Feminist Democracy), an essay on feminist leadership that is the opposite of the virilistic and predatory power embodied by Donald Trump.

Naves's expertise is sometimes solicited by French media.

=== Blogging activities ===
Marie-Cécile Naves writes a blog for HuffPost, where she discusses current issues related to sports, gender and the United States. She also has a blog on Mediapart.

== Publications ==
- Erwan Lecœur; Jean-Yves Camus; Nonna Mayer (2007). Dictionnaire de l'extrême droite. Ouvrage collectif. Paris: Larousse. p. 310. ISBN 978-2035826220.
- La fin des néoconservateurs ?, Paris, Ellipses, 2009, 141 p. ISBN 978-2729843830
- Le nouveau visage des droites américaines : les obsessions morales, raciales et fiscales des États-Unis. Limoges: Fyp éditions. 2015. p. 191. ISBN 978-2-36405-127-0.
- Trump, l'onde de choc populiste, Limoges, Fyp éditions, 2016, 144 p. ISBN 978-2364051416
- Avec Julian Jappert, Le pouvoir du sport, Limoges, Fyp éditions, 2017, 192 p. ISBN 978-2364051430
- Trump, la revanche de l'homme blanc. Paris: Textuel. 2018. p. 154. ISBN 978-2-84597-644-3.
- Géopolitique des États-Unis. Paris: Eyrolles. 2018. p. 182. ISBN 978-2-212-56873-8.
- Le sport, outil d'émancipation des filles et des femmes à travers le monde. Sport et Citoyenneté. 2019.
- François Durpaire (dir.), Histoire mondiale du bonheur, Ouvrage collectif, Paris, Le Cherche-midi, 2020, 448 p. ISBN 978-2749160979
- La Démocratie féministe : réinventer le pouvoir. Paris: Calmann-Levy. 2020. p. 320. ISBN 978-2-7021-8002-0.

== Distinctions ==
- Knight of L'ordre des palmes académiques
