= Christian Bromberger =

French anthropologist (born 1946)

Christian Bromberger (born 1946, in Paris) is a French professor of anthropology and an expert of Iranian studies at the University of Provence in France. He is a specialist in studying the culture of Gilan in the Northern side of Iran and also the head of the French Association of Iranian Studies.

Bromberger has conducted field research in the foothills of Gilan and has a major role in the establishment of the Guilan Rural Heritage Museum being a member of the museum's Board of Experts.

Fluent in English, Russian, Italian, French, Greek, Persian, and Gilaki languages, Bromberger is the author of numerous articles written in the Encyclopædia Iranica about Gilan.

== Life and education ==
After studying French classical literature, Bromberger completed his studies in anthropology. In 1990 he received his doctorate from the University of Aix-en-Provence, France, with a briefing on Gilan and at the same time he became the chairman of the Association for the Adaptation of Antarctic Anthropology in the Mediterranean (affiliated with the CNRS National Center for Scientific Research). His studies were both in the core French anthropology - Claude Lévi-Strauss Structuralism and André Leroi-Gourhan Cultural Studies. Therefore, his works are mainly an innovative combination of both anthropology studies. Since the 1970s, he has been working on a regular basis in Iran, Italy, and southern part of France. He was selected by several universities outside France as a visiting professor and also has been elected as a senior member of the Institut Universitaire de France since 1995. Heritage Council (Ministry of Culture) as well as the scientific responsibility of the Museum of European and Mediterranean Civilizations, which is currently taking shape in Marseille (France).

In February 2006, he was elected to the management of the French Association of Iranian Studies in Iran. His research, published in more than 170 works (collections, articles, and collaborations in collections), are on the basis of the method of expression and the appearance of collective identities in Iran (especially in Gilan province) and in the southern regions of Europe (Provence, Languedoc, Piedmont, Campania, Italy, and ...).

Bromberger has also done a series of studies about how people are fascinated by association football teams and games, including its rivalries, in several cities around the world such as Marseille, Naples, Turin, Lance, and Tehran. In addition, a number of his writings, which have a more general approach, are aimed at refining the methods, concepts, and themes of anthropology, especially in the studies of contemporary problems in the Western societies.
