= University of Provence =

Former French university

University of Provence Aix-Marseille I
- Type: Public research university
- Established: 1409–1792; 1896–1968; 1968–2012
- President: Jean-Paul Caverni
- Faculty: 1,527
- Administrative staff: 835
- Students: 23,056
- Undergraduates: 12,807
- Postgraduates: 7,948
- Doctoral students: 1,297
- Location: Aix-en-Provence, Arles, Aubagne, Avignon, Digne, Lambesc, Marseille, France
- Website: https://web.archive.org/web/20061010125054/http://www.univ-provence.fr/ (in French)

The University of Provence Aix-Marseille I (French: Université de Provence; Occitan: Universitat de Provença) was a public research university mostly located in Aix-en-Provence and Marseille. It was one of the three Universities of Aix-Marseille and was part of the Academy of Aix and Marseille. On 1 January 2012, it merged with the University of the Mediterranean and Paul Cézanne University to become Aix-Marseille University, the largest in terms of students, budgets and staff in the whole of the French-speaking world.

== Overview ==
The University of Provence was founded on 9 December 1409 as a studium generale by Louis II of Anjou, Count of Provence, and subsequently recognized by papal bull issued by Antipope Alexander V. In 1792, the University of Provence, along with twenty-one other universities, was dissolved during the French Revolution. The university was recreated in 1896. Following riots among university students in May 1968, it was re-established in 1968 through a merger of the school of humanities in Aix-en-Provence and the science one in Marseille. "The University of Provence [was] one of the most distinguished in France, second only to the University of Paris in the areas of French literature, history, and linguistics", according to Harvard University's website.

In the academic year of 2007–2008, 23,056 students were enrolled. Among them, 15,158 were female, while only 7,898 were male. 3,255 students came from countries outside France, 44 per cent of these came from Africa. 15,109 students studied in Aix-en-Provence, while others went to Marseille, Avignon, Digne, Lambesc, Arles and Aubagne. Overall, its facilities spanned 258 143 m^{2}.

In 2007, the budget was 120,7 million euros, with 39,2 million euros available after wages.

It had its own university press, Publications de l'Université de Provence. It also had its own theater, the Théâtre Antoine Vitez, named for Antoine Vitez.

== Departments ==
- Ancient Civilisations
- Anthropology
- Applied Linguistics
- Arabic, Berber languages, Persian, Turkish, Yiddish, Hebrew
- Art History and Archeology
- Biology
- Chemistry and Physics
- Cognitive Psychology
- Developing and Differential Psychology
- Drama
- English
- Environmental Studies
- Ergology
- French
- Film Studies
- Geography and Urban Planning
- German
- Hellenism
- Hispanic and Latin American Studies
- History
- Information Technology
- Italian
- Korean
- Linguistics
- Mathematics, Computer Science and Mechanics
- Media Studies
- Miscellaneous Languages (Armenian, Hindi and Japanese)
- Music
- Philosophy
- Phonetics and French as a Foreign Language
- Portuguese
- Psychology and Psychopathology
- Romanian
- Slavic Languages (Russian, Bulgarian, Polish, Serbian, Croatian, Bosnian, Czech)
- Sociology
- Teaching Studies
- Visual Arts

== Notable faculty and alumni ==
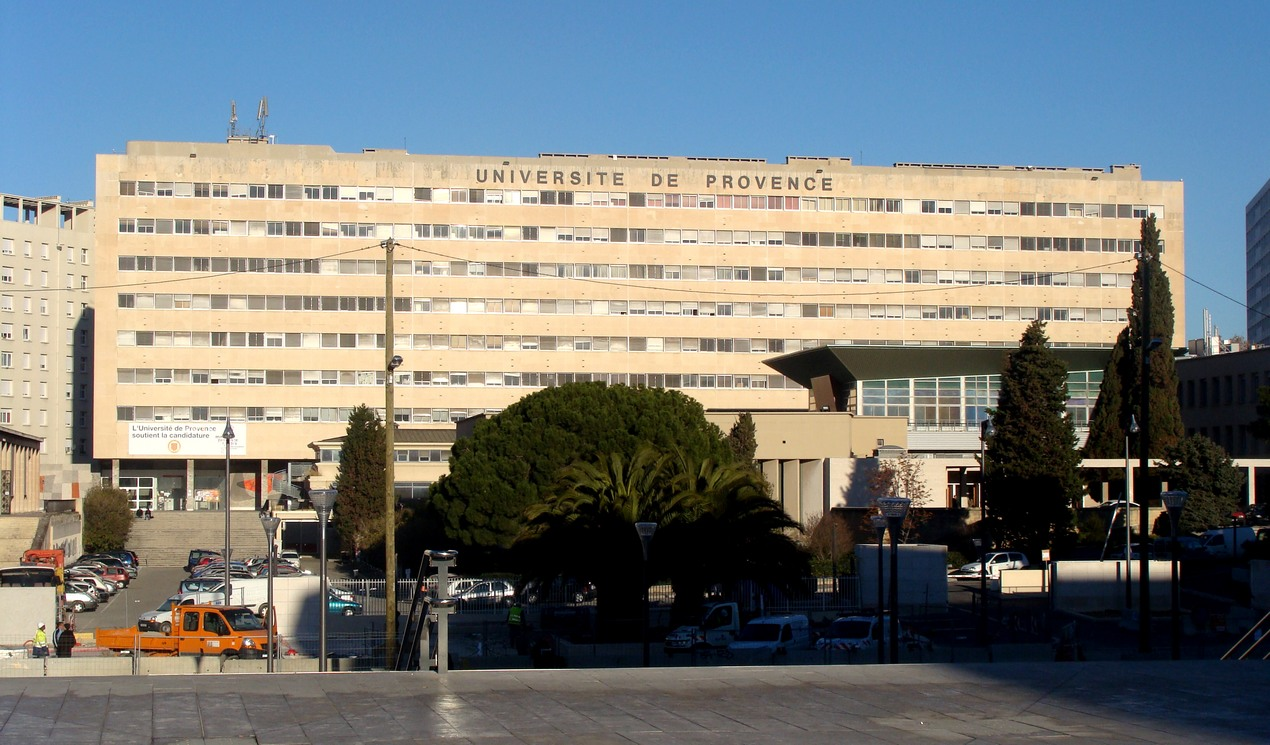
Facilities in Marseille

- Christian Bromberger, professor of anthropology and an expert of Iranian studies
- Georges Duby taught at the University of Provence.
- Mansour Mohamed El-Kikhia: Libyan politician and member of the interim National Transitional Council (NTC).
- Sadaf Foroughi and Kiarash Anvari are graduates of the film studies department.
- Gilles-Gaston Granger taught there from 1964 to 1986.
- Martine L. Jacquot, writer, journalist
- Pablo Daniel Magee, writer and investigative journalist, followed Hispanic and Latin American Studies at the University of Provence.
- John H. Hubbard taught at the University of Provence.
- 2008 Nobel Prize laureate in literature J.M.G. Le Clézio earned a master's degree with a thesis on Henri Michaux from the University of Provence in 1964.
- Annie Ousset-Krief, published historian and American Civilization specialist, taught at the University of Provence.
- Paul Veyne taught at the University of Provence in the 1960s.
- Norodom Ranariddh, a Cambodian politician and prince. He is a close relative to the current king of Cambodia, Norodom Sihamoni.
- Ariane Labed, actress, film director.
