= Benghazi =

Benghazi بنغازي
- City
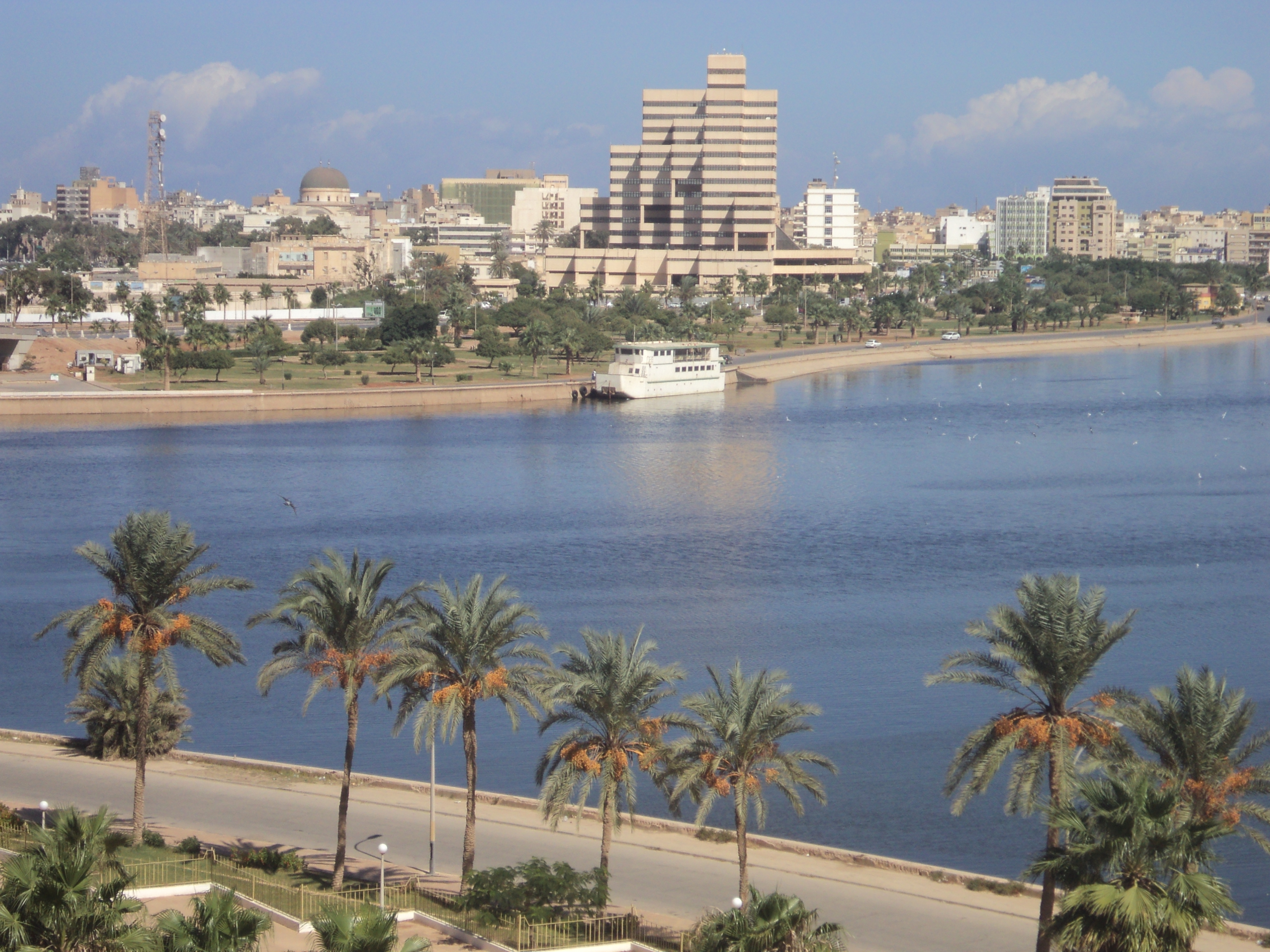
- Benghazi seafront
- Nickname: رَبّايِةْ الْذَايِحْ (Mother of Migrants) – الْمَدِينََه الْعَصِيّهْ (The Intractable City)
- Location in Libya Benghazi (Africa)
- Coordinates: 32°07′N 20°04′E
- Country: Libya
- Region: Cyrenaica
- District: Benghazi
- Settled: as Euesperides (c. 525 BC)
- Renamed: Berenice (c. middle of the 3rd century BC); Hesperides; Barneeq (c. middle of the 7th century AD); Marsa ibn Ghazi (c. 16th century); Bani Ghazi; Benghazi

Government
  - Mayor: Saqr Bojwari

Area
  - City: 314 km^{2} (121 sq mi)
- Elevation: 2 m (6.6 ft)

Population (2023)
  - City: 859,000
  - Rank: 2nd in Libya
  - Density: 2,740/km^{2} (7,090/sq mi)
  - Metro: 1,500,000
- Demonym: Benghazian
- Time zone: UTC+2 (EET)
- Area code: (+218) 61
- License Plate Code: 8

Benghazi (/bɛnˈɡɑːzi/) (Note: Arabic: بنغازي Banġāzī, Libyan Arabic: [bənˈʁɑːzi]; Italian: Bengasi; Turkish: Bingazi; Berber languages: Bernîk; also: Bengasi, Benghasi, Banghāzī, Binghāzī, Bengazi; Ancient Greek: Βερενίκη (Berenice) and Hesperides.) (lit. 'Son of Ghazi') is the second-largest city in Libya as well as the largest city in Cyrenaica, with an estimated population of 859,000 in 2023. Located on the Gulf of Sidra in the Mediterranean, Benghazi is also a major seaport.

A Greek colony named Euesperides had existed in the area from around 525 BC. In the 3rd century BC, it was relocated and refounded as the Ptolemaic city of Berenice. Berenice prospered under the Romans, and after the 3rd century AD it superseded Cyrene and Barca as the centre of Cyrenaica. The city went into decline during the Byzantine period and had already been reduced to a small town before its conquest by the Arabs. After around four centuries of peaceful Ottoman rule, in 1911, Italy captured Benghazi and the rest of Tripolitania from the Ottoman Empire during the Italo-Turkish War. Under Italian rule, Benghazi witnessed a period of extensive development and modernization, particularly in the second half of the 1930s under the Italian Libya colony. The city changed hands several times during World War II and was heavily damaged in the process. After the war Benghazi was rebuilt and became the co-capital of the newly independent Kingdom of Libya. Following the 1969 coup d'état by Muammar Gaddafi, Benghazi lost its capital status and all government offices relocated to Tripoli.

On 15 February 2011, an uprising against the government of Muammar Gaddafi occurred in the city. The revolt spread by 17 February to Bayda, Tobruk, Ajdabya, Al Marj in the East and Zintan, Zawiya in the West, calling for the end of the Gaddafi regime. Benghazi was seized by Gaddafi opponents on 21 February, who founded the National Transitional Council (NTC). On 19 March 2011, the city was the site of the turning point of the Libyan Civil War, when the Libyan Army attempted to score a decisive victory against the NTC by attacking Benghazi, but was forced back by local resistance and intervention from the French Air Force authorized by UNSC Resolution 1973 to protect civilians, allowing the rebellion to continue. By 2014, a second civil war broke out in Libya between the House of Representatives and the Government of National Accord, with parts of Libya split between Tobruk- and Tripoli-based governance until a permanent ceasefire led by a unitary government in 2020.

Benghazi remains a centre of Libyan commerce, industry, transport and culture, and one of the three largest cities in Libya with Tripoli and Misrata. It continues to hold institutions and organizations normally associated with a capital city, including several national government buildings as well as the National Library of Libya.

== History ==
=== Ancient Greek colony ===
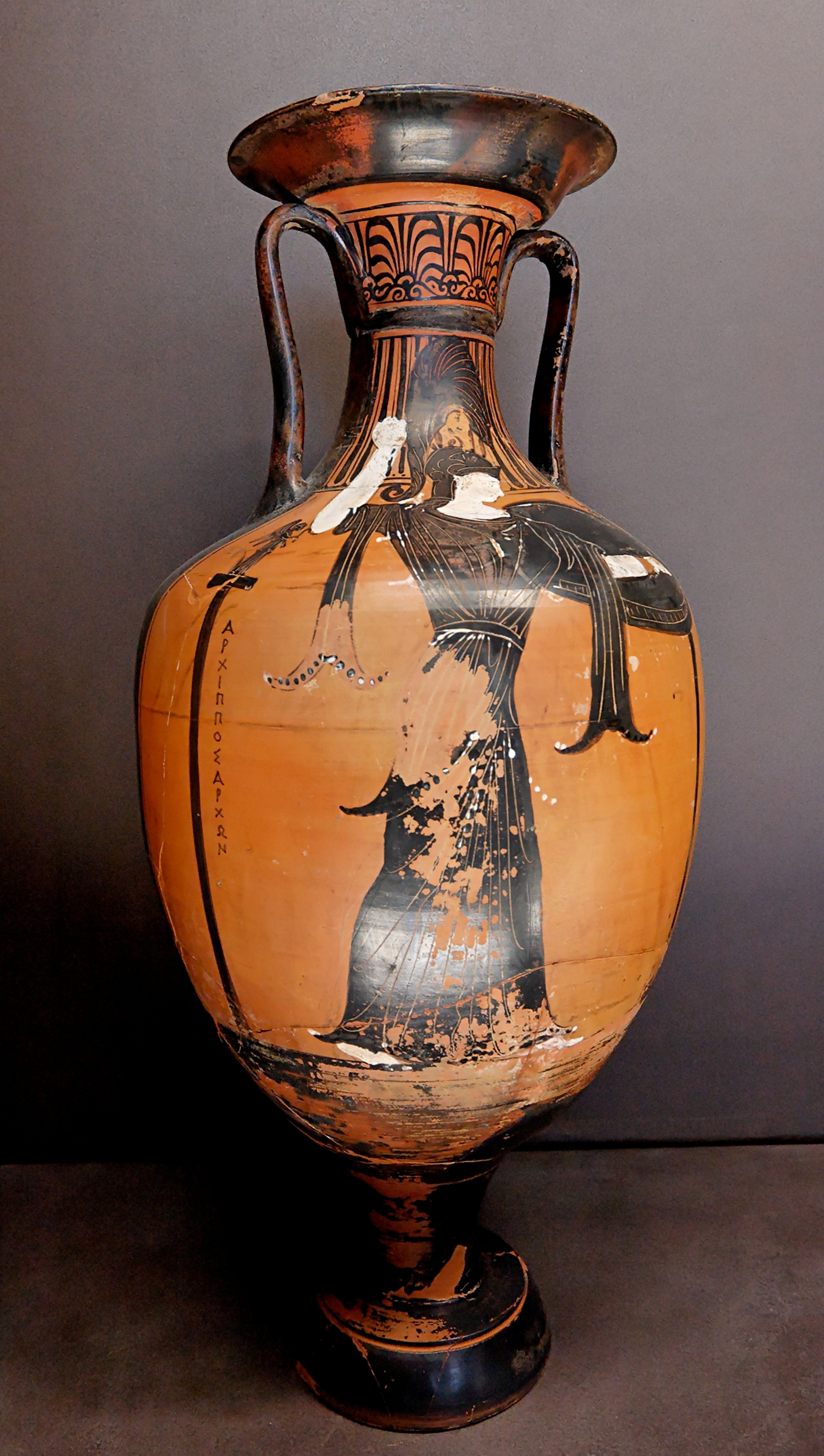
A panathenaic amphora found in Benghazi from the times of Euesperides

Archaeological evidence shows that ancient Greeks settled on the site of Benghazi in the late seventh century BC. They called the city Euesperides (Ancient Greek: Εὐεσπερίδες) and Hesperis (Ancient Greek: Ἑσπερίς). Euesperides was most likely founded by people from Cyrene or Barce, which was located on the edge of a lagoon which opened from the sea. At the time, this area may have been deep enough to receive small sailing vessels. The name was attributed to the fertility of the neighborhood, which gave rise to the mythological associations of the garden of the Hesperides. The ancient city existed on a raised piece of land opposite of what is now the Sidi-Abayd graveyard in the Northern Benghazi suburb of Sbikhat al-Salmani (al-Salmani Marsh).

The city is first mentioned by ancient sources in Herodotus' account of the revolt of Barca and the Persian expedition to Cyrenaica in c. 515 BC, where it is stated that the punitive force sent by the satrap of Egypt conquered Cyrenaica as far west as Euesperides. The oldest coins minted in the city date back to 480 BC. One side of those coins has an engraving of Delphi. The other side is an engraving of a silphium plant, once the symbol of trade from Cyrenaica because of its use as a rich seasoning and as a medicine. The coinage suggests that the city must have enjoyed some autonomy from Cyrene in the early 5th century BC, when the issues of Euesperides had their own types with the legend EU (ES), distinct from those of Cyrene.

The city was in hostile territory and was surrounded by inhospitable tribes. The Greek historian Thucydides mentions a siege of the city in 414 BC, by Libyans who were probably the Nasamones: Euesperides was saved by the unexpected arrival of the Spartan general Gylippus and his fleet, who were blown to Libya by contrary winds on their way to Sicily.

One of the Cyrenean kings whose fate is connected with the city is Arcesilaus IV. The king used his chariot victory at the Pythian Games of 462 BC to attract new settlers to Euesperides, where Arcesilaus hoped to create a safe refuge for himself against the resentment of the people of Cyrene. This proved ineffective, since when the king fled to Euesperides during the anticipated revolution (around 440 BC), he was assassinated, thus terminating the almost 200-year rule of the Battiad dynasty.

An inscription found there and dated around the middle of the 4th century BC states that the city had a constitution similar to that of Cyrene, with a board of chief magistrates (ephors) and a council of elders (gerontes). From 324 to 322 BC, the city supported the Spartan adventurer Thibron, who attempted to establish his own kingdom in Cyrenaica, but was defeated. The city came under the control of Ptolemy I and formed part of the breakaway kingdom of Magas of Cyrene after 276 BC.

In 246 BC, during the power struggle following Magas' death, his daughter Berenice married Ptolemy III, bringing the region back under Ptolemaic control. Euesperides was relocated to a new site underneath Benghazi's modern city centre and renamed Berenice. The move may have been due to the silting up of the lagoons, but there is no archaeological evidence for economic decline in the preceding period, and it is more likely that the refoundation was punishment for having opposed Berenice and Ptolemy's assumption of power.

=== Roman and Byzantine periods ===
Berenice later became a Roman city and greatly prospered for 600 years. The city superseded Cyrene and Barca as the chief center of Cyrenaica after the 3rd century AD and during the Persian campaigns; by 642–643, when it was conquered by the Muslim Arabs and partially destroyed, it had dwindled to an insignificant village among magnificent historic ruins.

In its more prosperous period, Berenice became a Christian bishopric. The first of its bishops whose name is recorded in extant documents is Ammon, to whom Dionysius of Alexandria wrote in about 260. Dathes was at the First Council of Nicaea in 325, and Probatius at a synod held in Constantinople in 394. No longer a residential bishopric, Berenice is today listed by the Catholic Church as a titular see.

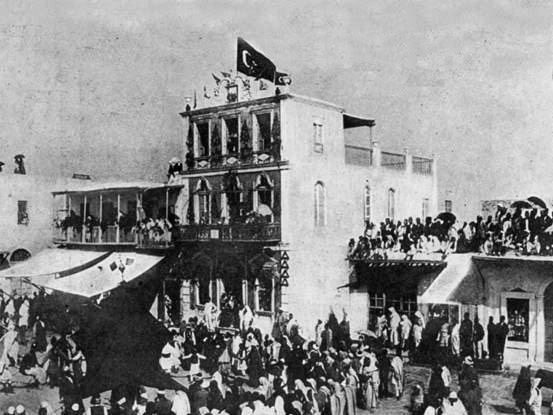
The Ottoman flag is raised during Mawlid celebrations in Benghazi in 1896.

=== Ottoman province ===
In the 13th century, the small settlement became an important player in the trade growing up between Genoese merchants and the tribes of the hinterland. In 16th century maps, the name of Marsa ibn Ghazi appears.

Benghazi had a strategic port location, one that was too useful to be ignored by the Ottomans. In 1578, the Turks conquered Benghazi and it was ruled from Tripoli by the Karamanlis from 1711 to 1835; it then passed under direct Ottoman rule until 1911. Greek and Italian sponge fishermen worked its coastal waters. In 1858, and again in 1874, Benghazi was devastated by bubonic plague.

=== Italian colonial rule ===
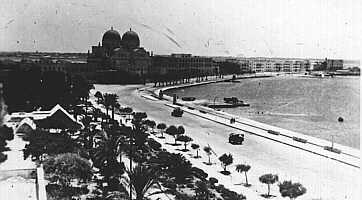
The colonial Italians created the "Lungomare" (sea-walk) of Benghazi and constructed many other buildings.

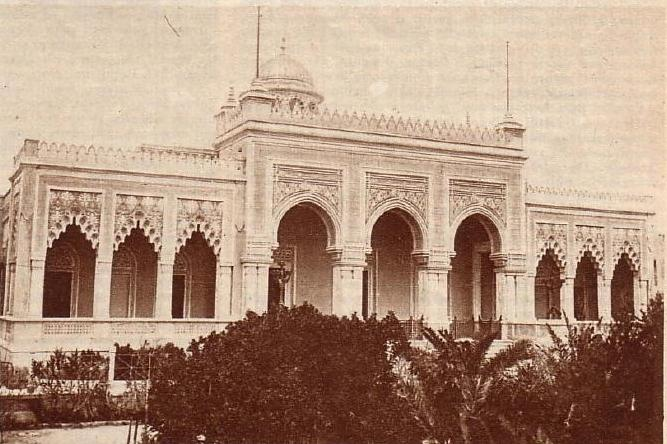
Littorio Palace in Benghazi was the seat of the Cyrenaican regional assembly.

In 1911, Benghazi was invaded and conquered by the Italians. Nearly half the local population of Cyrenaica under the leadership of Omar Mukhtar resisted the Italian occupation.

In the early 1930s, the revolt was over and the Italians—under governor Italo Balbo—started attempts to assimilate the local population with pacifying policies: a number of new villages for Cyrenaicans were created with health services and schools.

Additionally Cyrenaica was populated by more than 20,000 Italian colonists in the late 1930s, mainly around the coast of Benghazi. Benghazi population was made up of more than 35 per cent of Italians in 1939. As a consequence, there was in Cyrenaica and mostly in Benghazi a huge economic development in the second half of the 1930s. Benghazi grew to be a modern city with a new airport, new railway station, new seaplane station, an enlarged port and many facilities. Benghazi was going to be connected in 1940 by a new railway to Tripoli, but in summer of that year war started between Italians and British and infrastructure development came to a standstill.

=== World War II ===
British troops entering Benghazi, 29 December 1941

In World War II Benghazi changed hands several times. During Operation Compass the city was captured from the Italians by Combe Force on 6 February 1941.

Benghazi was recaptured by Axis powers, led by general Erwin Rommel of the German Africa Corps, on 4 April.

It was taken again during Operation Crusader by the British on 24 December only to change hands again on 29 January 1942 in the Rommel Afrika Corps' push to Egypt.

During the fateful Battle of El Alamein–106 kilometres (66 miles) from Alexandria, Egypt–British troops led by general Bernard Montgomery again defeated the Afrika Corps which then made a long steady retreat westward passing through Benghazi for the final time. On 20 November, Benghazi was captured by the British Eighth Army and thereafter held by the British.

In August 1943 from Benina airport of Benghazi started the US attack on the Ploiești oil refineries with 178 B-24 bombers (called Operation Tidal Wave). An Italian "Arditi" paratroopers attack that destroyed some Allied aircraft in June 1943.

=== Contemporary Benghazi ===
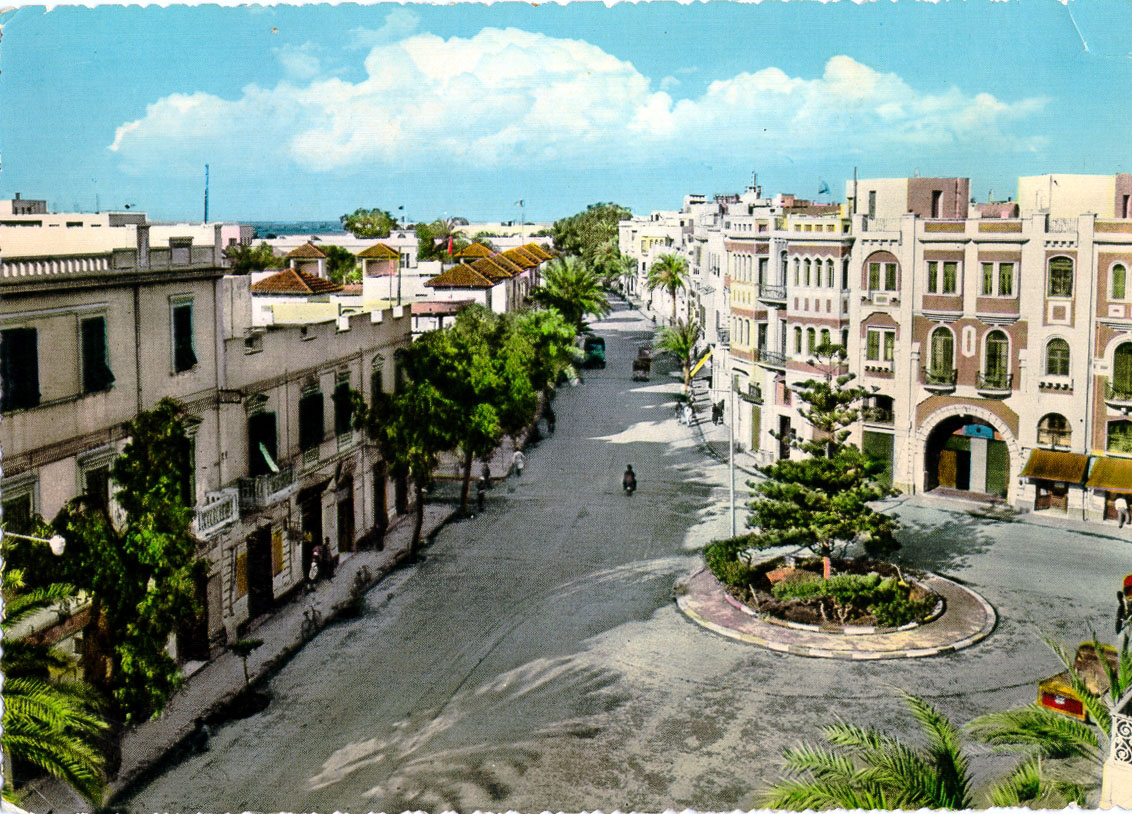
Maydan al-Shajara, in central Benghazi in 1964

Heavily bombed in World War II, Benghazi was later rebuilt with the country's newly found oil wealth as a gleaming showpiece of modern Libya. It became the capital city of Emirate of Cyrenaica (1949–1951) under Idris Senussi I. In 1951, Cyrenaica was merged with Tripolitania and Fezzan to form the independent Kingdom of Libya, of which both Benghazi and Tripoli were capital cities.

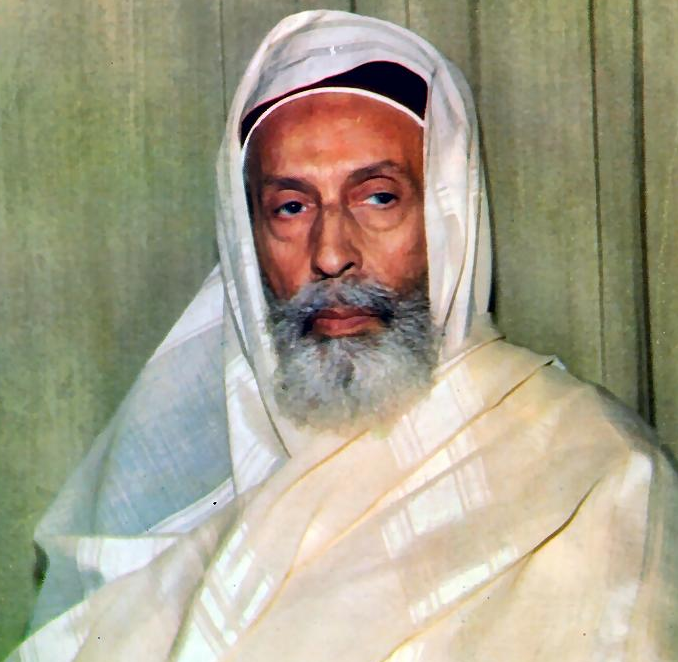
Support for the Senussi dynasty remained strong in Cyrenaica.

Benghazi lost its capital status when the Free Officers under the leadership of Muammar Gaddafi staged a coup d'état in 1969, whereafter all government institutions were concentrated in Tripoli, Even though King Idris was forced into exile and the monarchy abolished, support for the Senussi dynasty remained strong in Cyrenaica. This was emphasized by real or perceived injustices from the government towards the people of Benghazi, including the demolition in the year 2000 of the arena of football club Alahly Benghazi S.C., following anti-government protests. On 15 April 1986, U.S. Air Force and Navy planes bombed Benghazi and Tripoli. President Ronald Reagan justified the attacks by claiming Libya was responsible for terrorism directed at the United States, including the bombing of La Belle discothèque in West Berlin ten days before.

=== 2011 Revolution ===
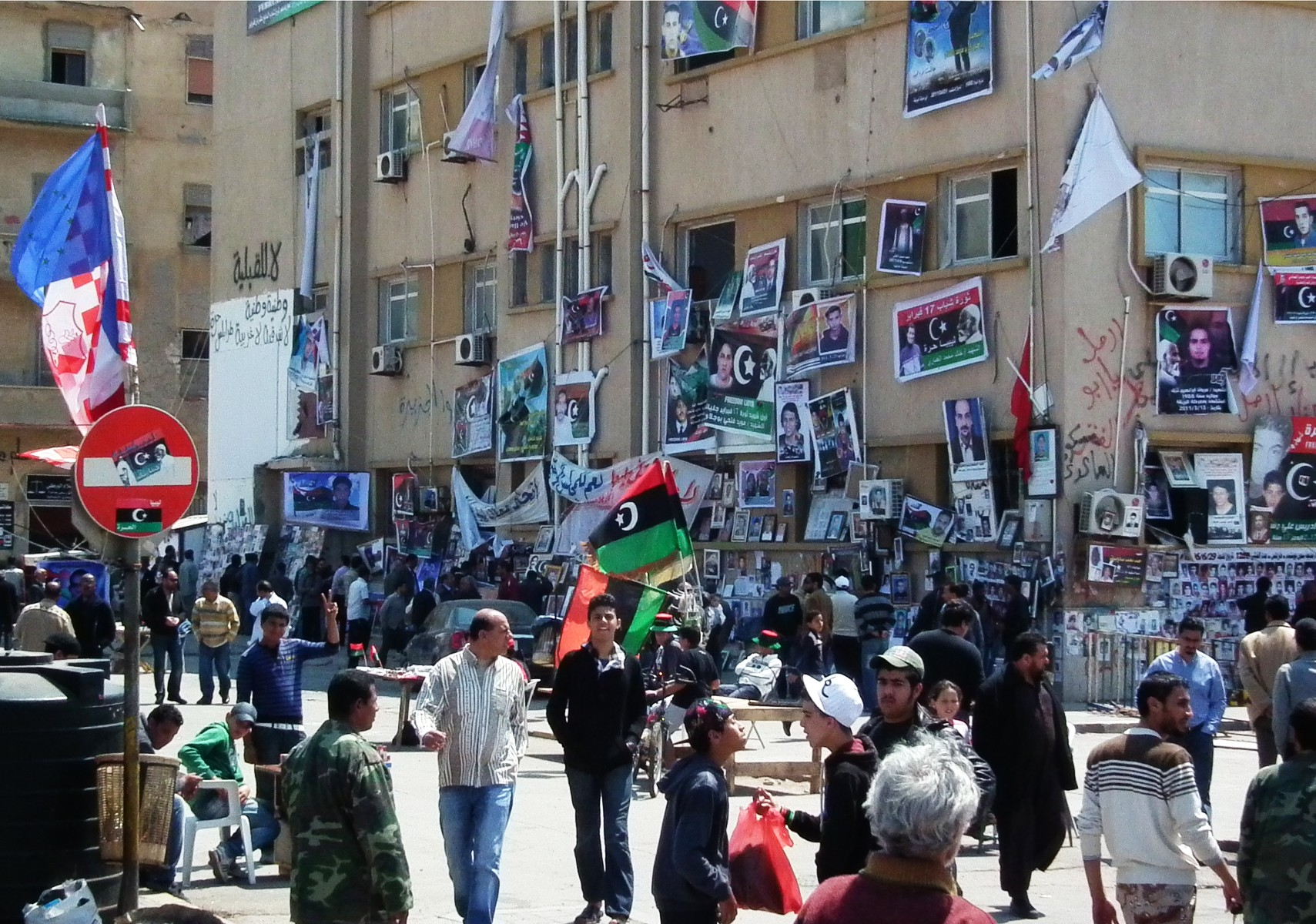
Court square in Benghazi, April 2011. At the central place for gatherings and demonstrations the walls are draped with pictures of casualties, mourners passing by.

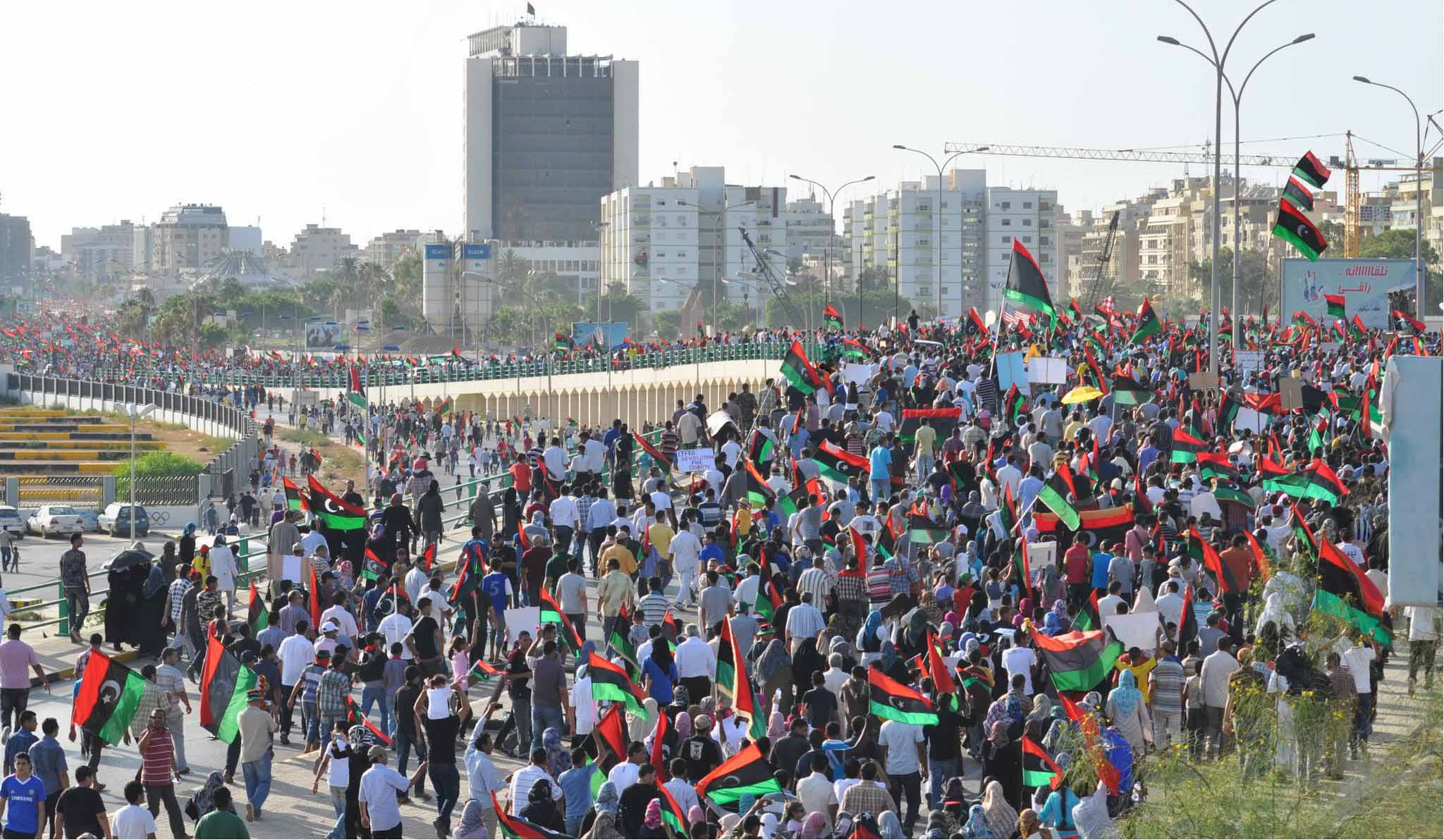
A large crowd of anti-Gaddafi protesters from in and around Benghazi took to the streets on 6 July 2011, amassing in front of the Kateba and the courtyard.

In February 2011, peaceful protests erupted in Benghazi that were brutally suppressed by Gaddafi's armed forces and loyalists. The violence urged the people to fight back and try to overthrow Gaddafi from power in The Libyan Revolution. At least 500 people were killed in the protests against the government.

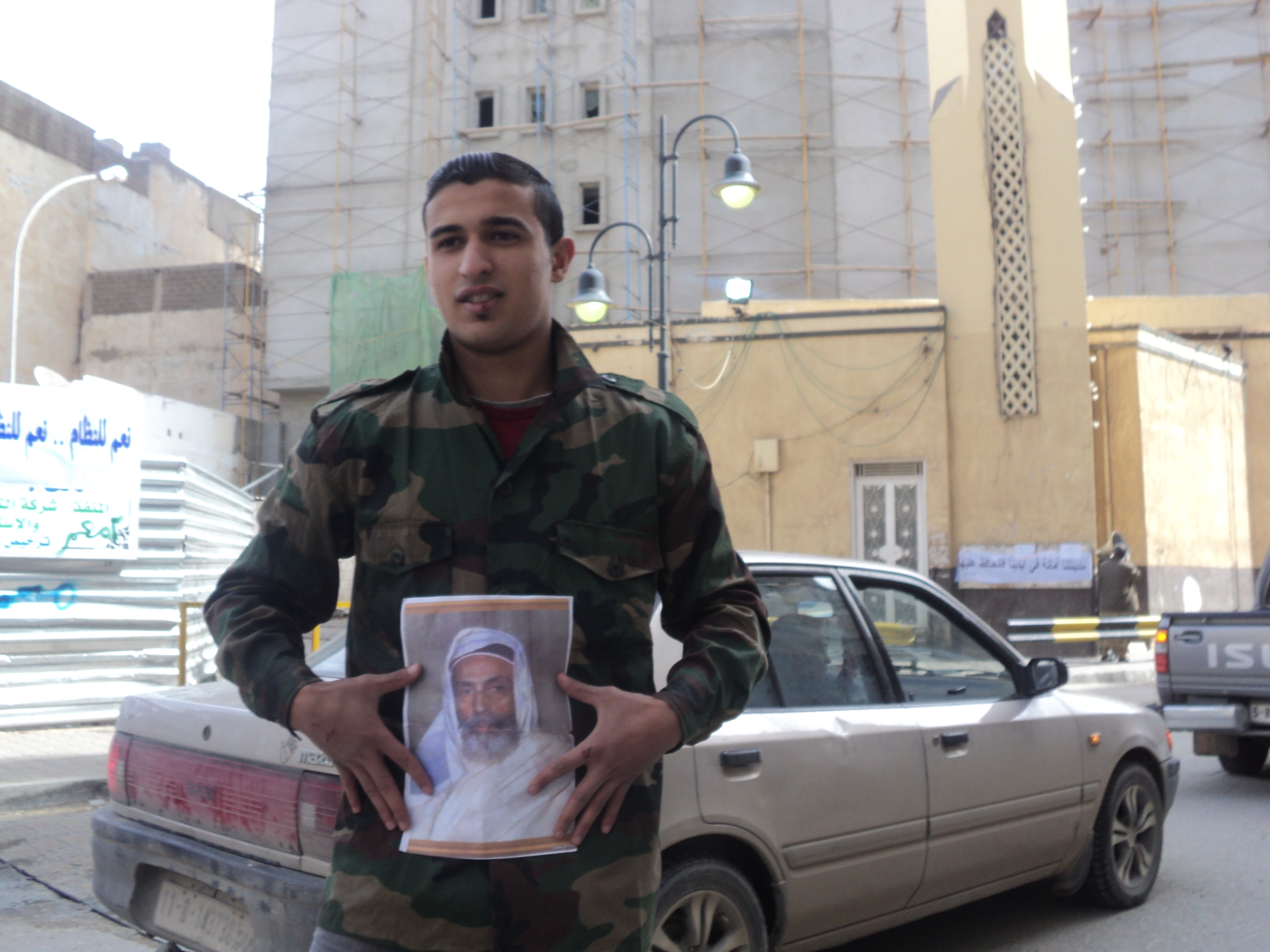
A young Benghazian carrying (deposed) King Idris' photo

The former Libyan flag used in the Kingdom of Libya was used by many protesters as an opposition flag. Demonstrators were also seen carrying images of King Idris I. Benghazi and the Cyrenaica have been traditional strongholds of the royal Senussi dynasty.

By 21 February, the city was reported to be largely controlled by the opposition. The widely loathed mayor, Huda Ben Amer, nicknamed "the Executioner", had fled the city for Tripoli. Residents organised to direct traffic and collect refuse. By 24 February, a committee made up of lawyers, judges and respected local people had been formed in order to provide civic administration and public services within the city. Two local radio stations, operated by Voice of Free Libya, along with a newspaper, were also established.

From 26 February to 26 August, Benghazi was the temporary headquarters of the National Transitional Council which is led by the former justice minister, Mustafa Abdul Jalil, until Tripoli was liberated.

On 19 March, pro-Gaddafi forces almost defeated the rebellion when they began attacking the city of Benghazi in a major offensive, but were forced back the next day when NATO forces began implementing United Nations Security Council Resolution 1973.

On 1 June, explosives were detonated in a car near the Tibesti Hotel, with a rebel spokesman calling the bombing a "cowardly act". It was suspected that an officer was killed, and many people started to shout out anti-Gaddafi chants while the Tibesti was cordoned off.

On 19 May 2012, residents of Benghazi voted in historic local elections; this was the first time such elections have been held in the city since the 1960s, and turnout was high.

=== 2012 attack on U.S. diplomatic mission ===
On 11 September 2012, the U.S. diplomatic mission in Benghazi was attacked by a heavily armed group of 125–150 gunmen, whose trucks bore the logo of Ansar al-Sharia, a group of Islamist militants, also known as Al Qaeda in the Arabian Peninsula, working with the local government to manage security in Benghazi. U.S. Ambassador J. Christopher Stevens, Foreign Service Information Management Officer (IMO) Sean Smith, and CIA contractors and former Navy SEALs Tyrone S. Woods and Glen Doherty were killed during a series of raids, commencing at nightfall and continuing into the next morning. Ten others were injured.

=== Second Libyan Civil War ===
With the end of fighting, the city is currently undergoing a reconstruction drive, particularly around the Hawari and Venicia Districts.

Following the outbreak of the second Libyan Civil War in 2014, Benghazi became the subject of heavy fighting between the Libyan National Army-aligned House of Representatives government, and the Islamist Shura Council of Benghazi Revolutionaries and ISIL-aligned Wilayat Barqa, which were entrenched in various pockets in the city. During the closing months of the battle, between late-2016 and mid-2017, much of the urban center in and around the remaining Shura Council pocket in the central coastal quarters of Suq Al-Hout and al-Sabri suffered heavy bombardment and war damage. Wilayat Barqa militants reportedly fled Benghazi in early January, while the LNA's General Khalifa Haftar declared the city cleared of the Shura Council on 5 July 2017. Despite Haftar's declaration of the liberation of the city, dozens of gunmen remained fortified and besieged in Sidi Akribesh, according to sources close to military. LNA captured the last militant-held district in December 2017.

On 23 October 2020, the 5+5 Joint Libyan Military Commission representing the LNA and the GNA reached a "permanent ceasefire agreement in all areas of Libya". The agreement, effective immediately, required that all foreign fighters leave Libya within three months while a joint police force would patrol disputed areas. The first commercial flight between Tripoli and Benghazi took place that same day. On 10 March 2021, an interim unity government was formed, which was slated to remain in place until the next Libyan presidential election scheduled for 10 December. However, the election has been delayed several times since, effectively rendering the unity government in power indefinitely, causing tensions which threaten to reignite the war.

The unity government has undertaken major rebuilding efforts in Benghazi. However, the rebuilding has not been without controversy: in March 2023, the military razed a large swath of Benghazi's historic center at night without notifying the municipal administration, resulting in the destruction of many of the city's most notable Italian-era buildings.

== Population ==
=== Demographics ===
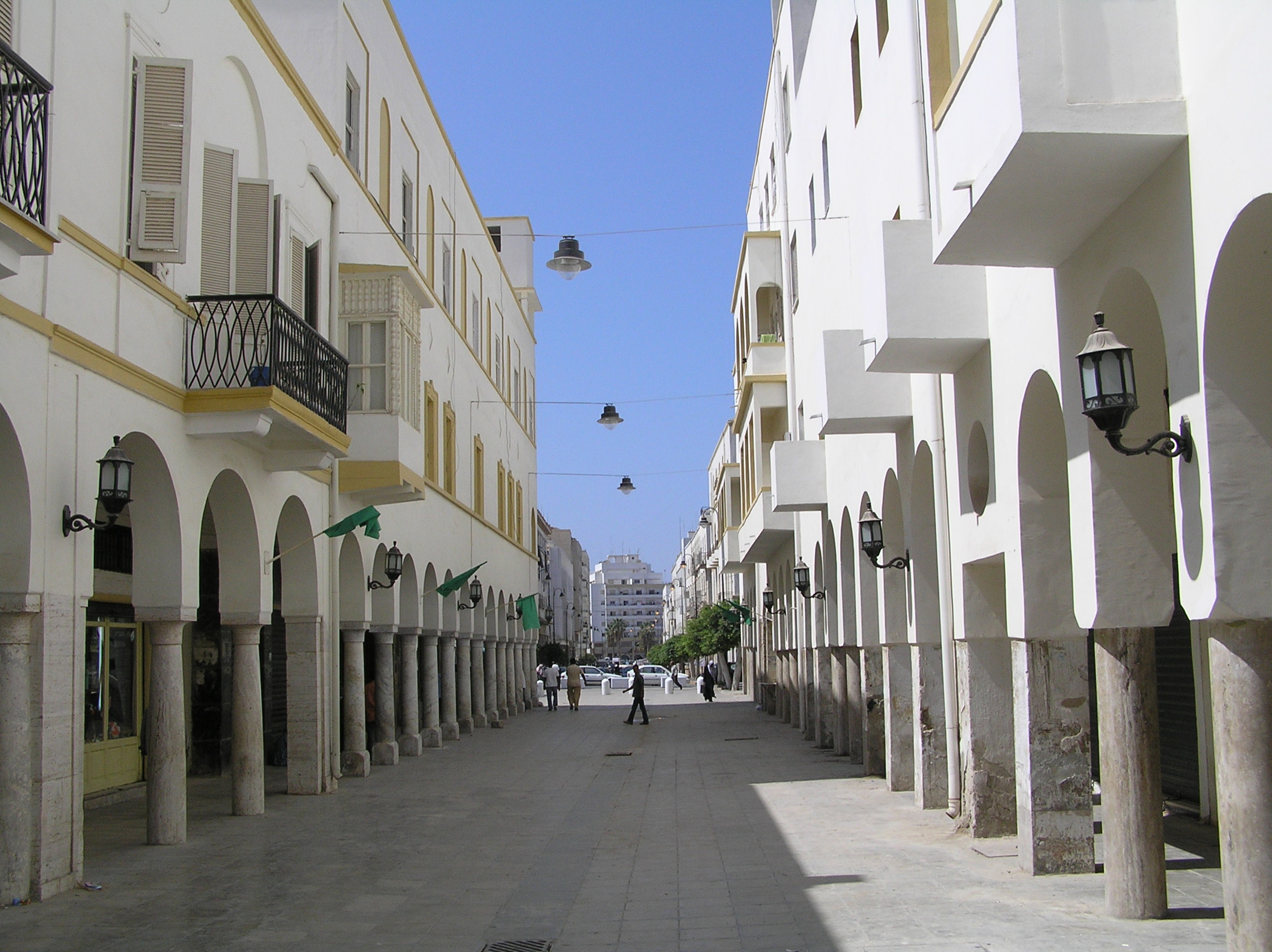
Omar Al Mukhtar Street in the Italian quarter was traditionally home to an urbane demographic, before many families left the old town to resettle elsewhere in the city. Some, if not all of these buildings were demolished in March 2023.

As with other cities in Libya, there is a reasonable amount of ethnic diversity in Benghazi. The people of eastern Libya, Benghazi included, have in the past always been of predominantly Arab descent. In recent times, however, there has been an influx of African immigrants into Benghazi. There are also many Egyptian immigrants in Benghazi. A small Greek community also exists in Benghazi. The Greek island of Crete is a short distance from Benghazi, and many families in Benghazi today bear Cretan surnames. There are even a few Italian-related families, left from the colonial times before World War II.

The overwhelming majority of Libyans in Benghazi were of Berber descent until the arrival of Bani Salim (Arabic tribe). In the 11th century, the Sa'adi tribes from the Banu Sulyam migrated to Cyrenaica; each sub-tribe from the Sa'adi historically controlled a section of Cyrenaica. Benghazi and its surrounding areas were controlled by Barghathi tribe. In modern times, Benghazi has seen a lot of Libyans from different parts of the country move into the city, especially since the Kingdom era. Many came to Benghazi from Misrata. Thus Benghazi has always been seen as a welcoming city, a city which the local Bedouins refer to as 'Benghazi rabayit al thayih' which can be translated as, 'Benghazi raises the lost', as many immigrants who arrived from the Western Maghreb or the former Al Andalus came with little money, clothes or food and were looked after very generously by the local Bedouin population as well as those arriving following the Italian war from western Libya.

=== Religion ===
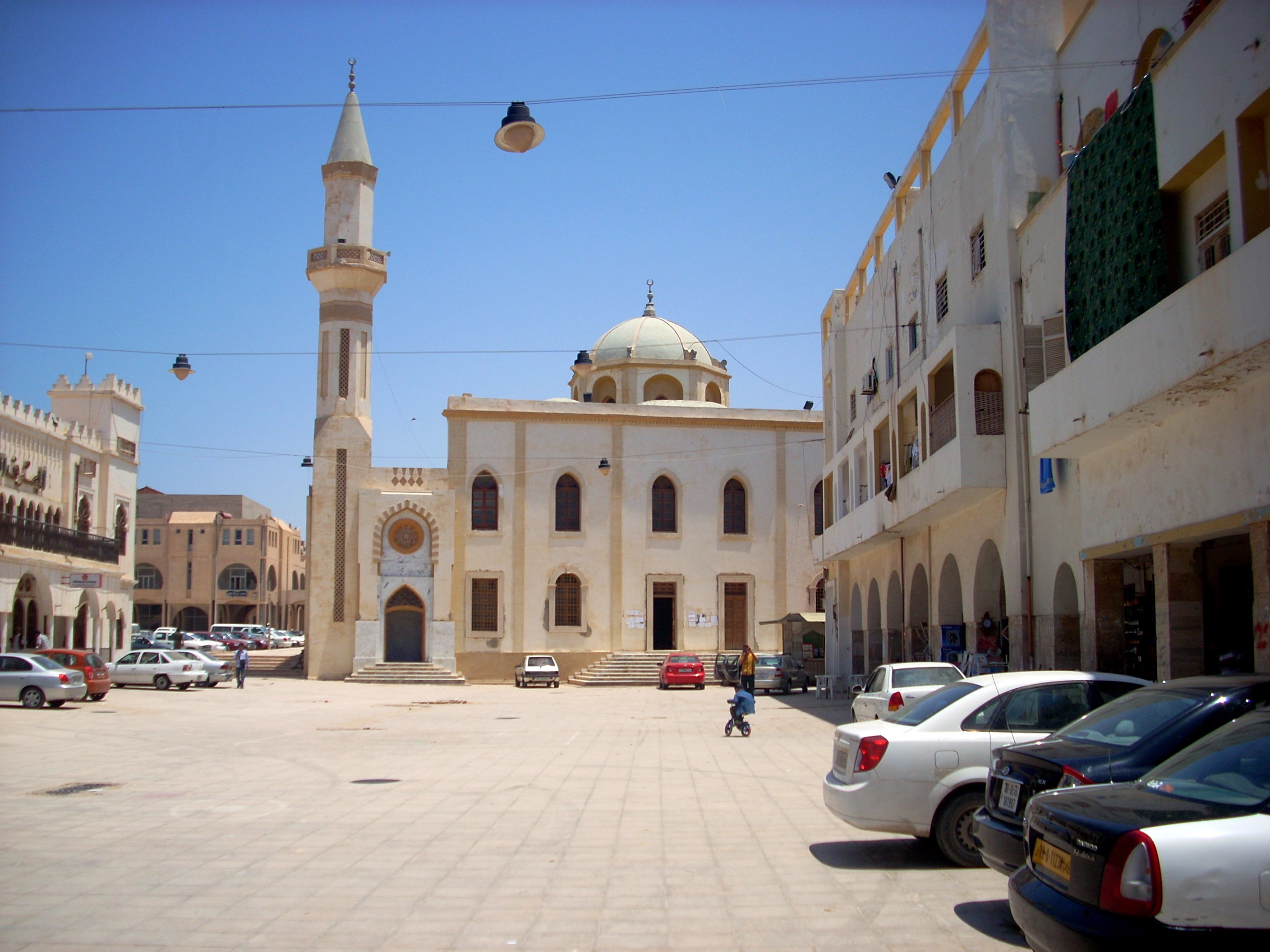
The Atiq Mosque in Maydan al-Baladiya is the oldest mosque in Benghazi. The majority of people in the city are Sunni Muslims.

The predominant religion in Benghazi is Islam. Almost all of the city's inhabitants are Sunni Muslims. During Islamic holidays such as Ramadan, most abstain from food; restaurants are usually empty during the day, with the exception of some expatriates and tourists. Alcohol is banned by law in Benghazi and throughout Libya in accordance with government regulations. The often conservative nature of Benghazi creates a strong sense of family life in the city; most teenagers and young adults live at home until they get married, though that is changing in recent years. Many Muslims in Benghazi adhere to the traditional Maliki school of religious law; however, it is much less so than in the past decades. Benghazi is said to be the most “liberal” city out of all Libya. The Senussi order from which the royal dynasty sprang has traditionally enjoyed strong support in Benghazi and the Cyrenaica.

For Muslims, there are many mosques throughout Benghazi; the oldest and best known (such as the Atiq and Osman mosques) are located in and around the medina.

There is also a small Christian community in the city. The Roman Catholic Apostolic Vicariate of Benghazi's Franciscan Church of the Immaculate Conception serves Benghazi's Latin Catholic community of roughly 4,000; there is also a decommissioned cathedral church (1929–1939; closed 1977; currently abandoned). For Egyptian Copts, there is a Coptic Orthodox church (which was formerly the grand synagogue) with two serving priests.

Jews have lived in Benghazi, as they did elsewhere in Libya, from Roman times until 1967, when most were airlifted out after a series of riots in the years after the 1948 Arab–Israeli War. However, there are no Jews remaining in Libya today.

=== Education ===
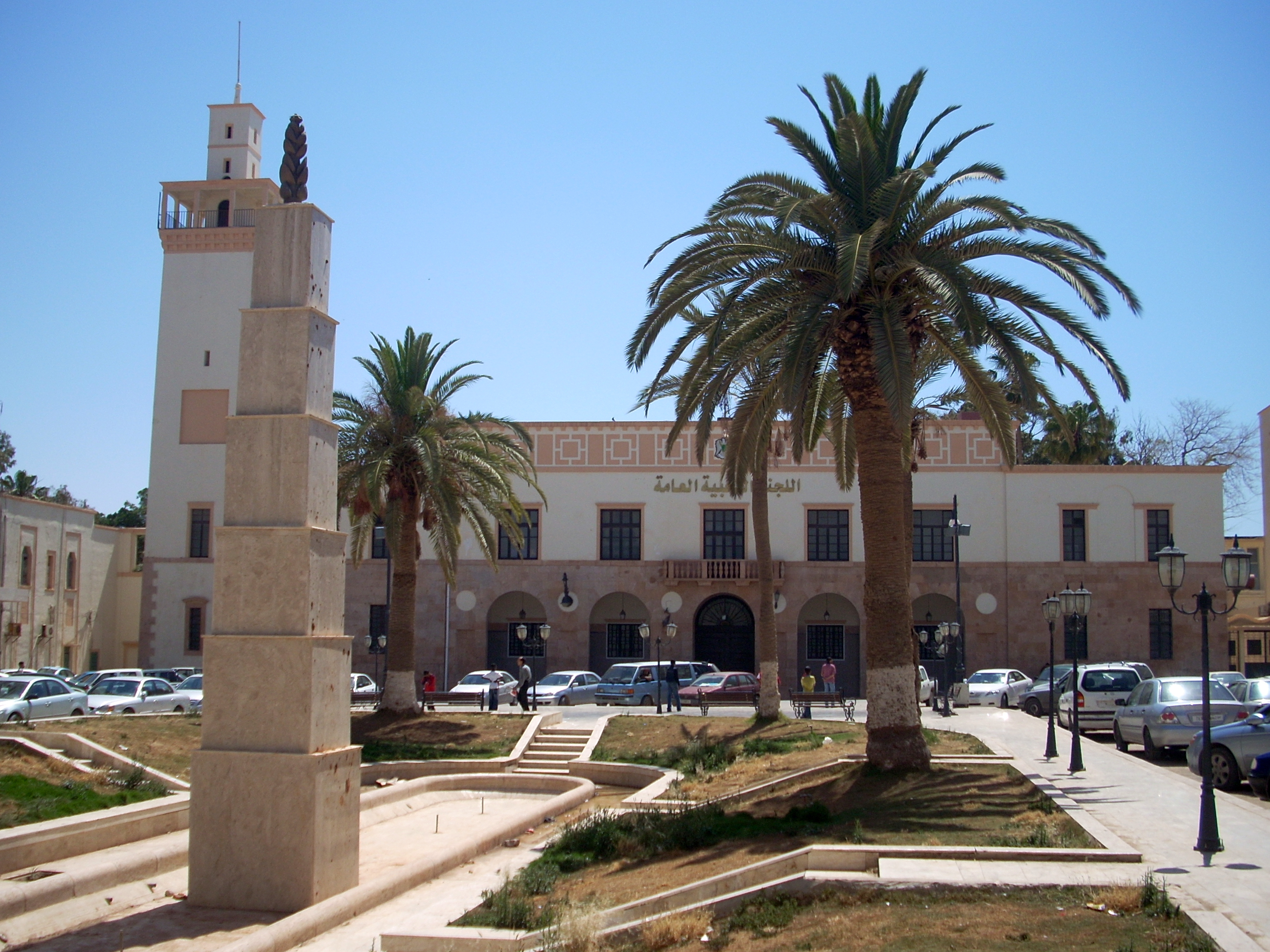
Al Manar Royal Palace in central Benghazi, University of Libya's first campus, founded by royal decree in 1955

The oldest university in Libya is the University of Libya, founded by royal decree in 1955. It was initially housed in the royal Al Manar Palace before receiving its own campus in 1968. It was later split and became known as University of Benghazi. There are some private universities such as Libyan International Medical University.

Education in Benghazi, as throughout Libya, is compulsory and paid entirely by taxpayers. Compulsory education continues until ninth grade. There are many public primary and secondary schools scattered throughout the city, as well as some private schools.

International schools include:

- International School Benghazi
- Benghazi European School
- British School in Benghazi

== Geography ==
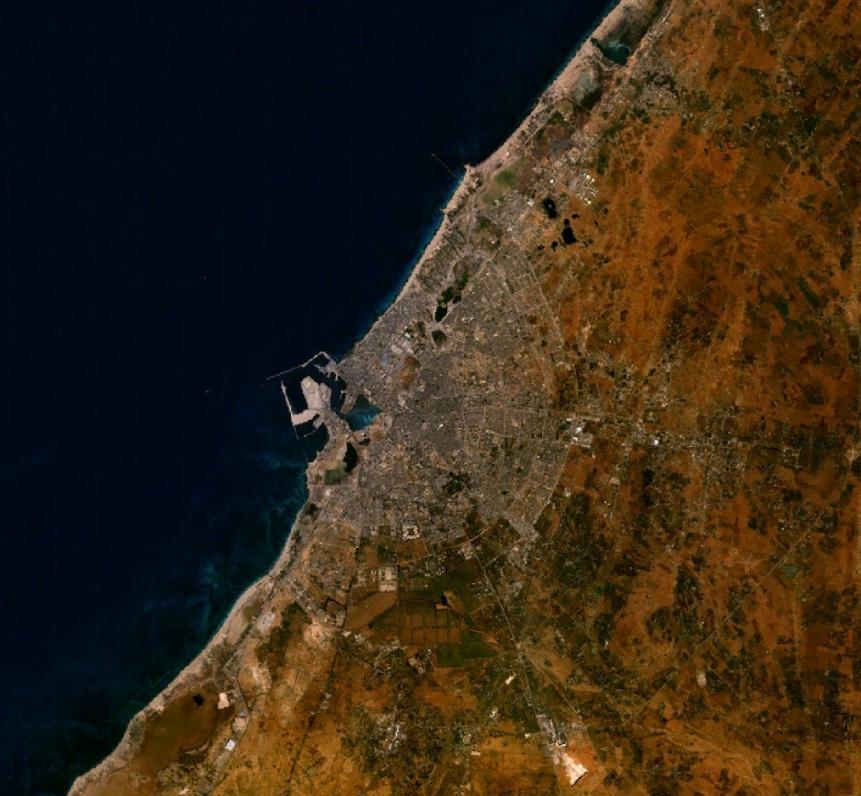
Satellite image of Benghazi

Benghazi is one of the sub-regions of the area referred to as Cyrenaica, the others being the Jebel Akhdar and the coastal plain running east of Apollonia. Cyrenaica is surrounded by desert on three sides, hence in ancient times the most accessible civilisation was to the North, across the Mediterranean, in Crete and Greece, only 400 kilometres (250 miles) away.

Benghazi is surrounded by the "barr", arid steppe. The Jebel Akhdar, literally, "the Green Mountain", just north of Benghazi, rises to the east. Here the vegetation and climate is more Mediterranean in feel with none of the desert landscapes found further south. A large section of the western Jebel Akhdar is taken up by the fertile Marj plain. Further east is the second level of the Jebel Akhdar, between 500 metres (1,600 feet) and over 875 m (2,871 ft) above sea level, often thickly wooded and cut by ravines. Annual rainfall here, especially around Cyrene, can reach 500 millimetres (20 inches). It was this fertile site northeast of Benghazi that the Greeks chose for their settlement. The soil in Benghazi is a rich red colour and very clayey. Sirocco winds are not uncommon in the city, and as such, many of Benghazi's smaller streets and buildings can be quite dusty.

To the north, below the steep cliffs of the plateau, lies a narrow belt of Mediterranean farmland. Olives and other Mediterranean fruits and vegetables are grown here. To the south, the forest and farmland gives way to juniper bush maquis and pre-desert scrub with some winter grazing.

As a district, Benghazi borders Hizam Al Akhdar, which surrounds it on land.

=== Natural recreation and parks ===
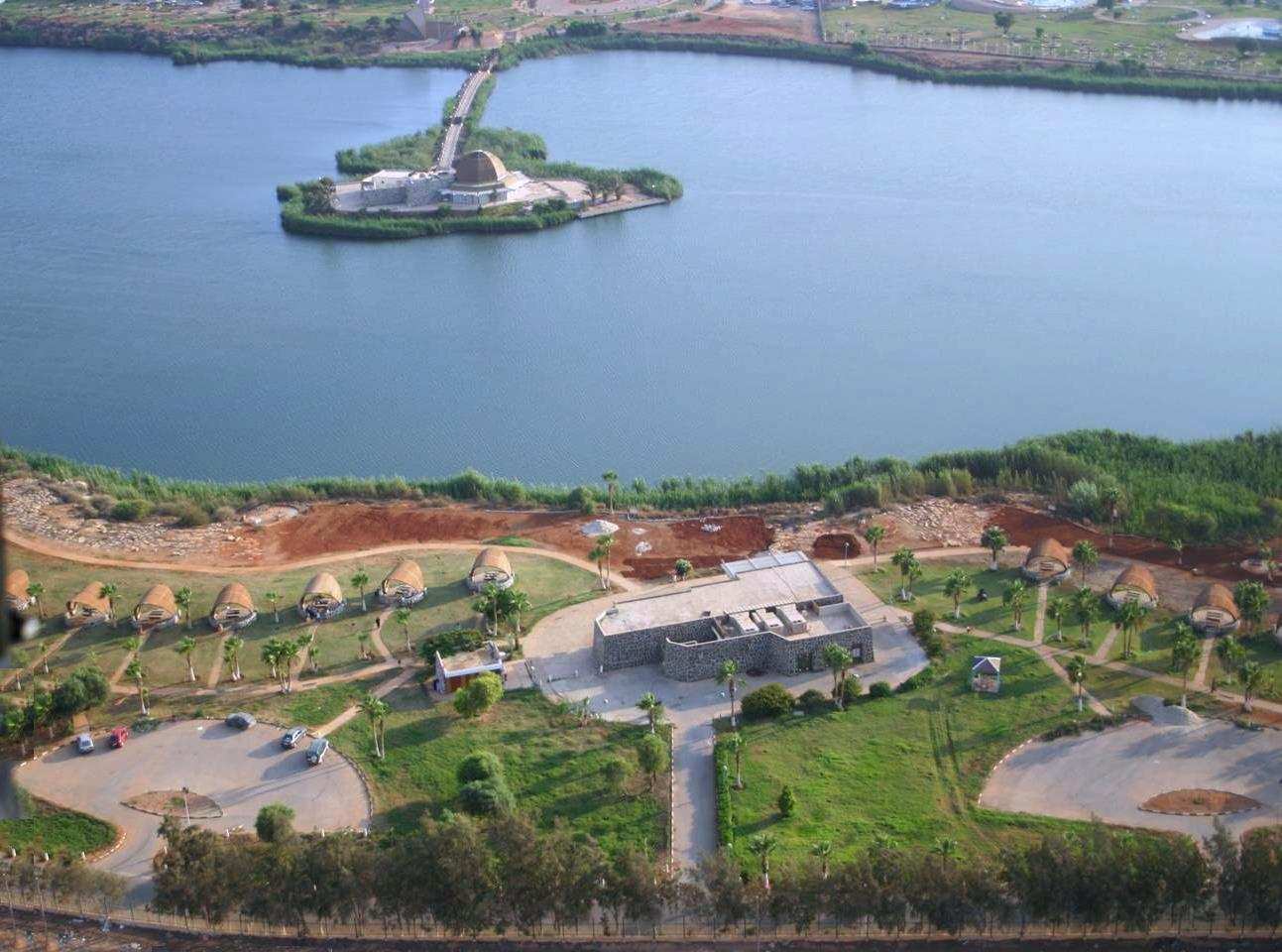
Al-Buduzeera is one of the largest and most popular parks in Benghazi.

Although Benghazi does not have a high percentage of green space per resident, there are a few public parks and green recreational areas in the city. Perhaps the most famous is the zoological garden and theme park in Al-Fuwayhat also known as Benghazi Zoo; the park is referred to locally as al-Bosco, an Italian name for wood (as in "Belleau Wood", not as in "wood plank"). The park is a combination of a zoo with trees planted during Italian rule and which contains wild cats, primates, elephants, birds and other animals, and a small theme park containing electrical rides, added later in the 1980s as part of a redevelopment of the entire site. It is one of the most popular parks in Benghazi, and is very busy on public holidays, as well as amongst school children and scouts on outings.

On Gamal Abdel Nasser Street is 23 July Park, another large green space which faces the Tibesti Hotel and borders the waterfront. The park is popular amongst teenagers, and families on Thursday nights (as Friday is a day off work throughout Libya). Another large and popular park is al-Buduzira in North Benghazi on the al-'Uruba Road in al-Kwayfiya. The park surrounds a natural lake, and is more rugged in nature than the city parks. A section of al-Buduzira is also a water park with large slides, whilst the southern part of the park has picnic areas which are popular in the summers.

=== Climate ===
Benghazi has a warm semi-arid climate (Köppen climate classification BSh) with hot and dry, prolonged summers and mild to cool, slightly wet winters. In the north of the city lies the Mediterranean-climate 'Jabal Al-Akhdar' (Green Mountains), and in the south the climate is becoming desert-like. Summers in Benghazi are hot and rainless, but with high levels of humidity. Winters are mild with occasional rain. Annual rainfall is low at 270 mm (11 in) per year. The city's local water supply is supplemented by groundwater transported from the aquifers of southern Libya along the Great Manmade River.

Climate data for Benghazi (Benina International Airport) (1991–2020 normals, extremes 1945-present)
Month	Jan	Feb	Mar	Apr	May	Jun	Jul	Aug	Sep	Oct	Nov	Dec	Year
Record high °C (°F)	26.3 (79.3)	31.7 (89.1)	38.0 (100.4)	39.9 (103.8)	44.8 (112.6)	45.6 (114.1)	43.0 (109.4)	44.0 (111.2)	42.1 (107.8)	39.0 (102.2)	37.2 (99.0)	31.0 (87.8)	45.6 (114.1)
Mean daily maximum °C (°F)	16.6 (61.9)	17.0 (62.6)	20.5 (68.9)	24.4 (75.9)	28.3 (82.9)	31.0 (87.8)	31.4 (88.5)	32.0 (89.6)	31.1 (88.0)	28.0 (82.4)	22.9 (73.2)	18.3 (64.9)	25.1 (77.2)
Daily mean °C (°F)	12.9 (55.2)	13.0 (55.4)	15.5 (59.9)	18.9 (66.0)	22.7 (72.9)	25.5 (77.9)	26.5 (79.7)	27.1 (80.8)	26.1 (79.0)	23.1 (73.6)	18.5 (65.3)	14.6 (58.3)	20.4 (68.7)
Mean daily minimum °C (°F)	9.2 (48.6)	9.0 (48.2)	10.5 (50.9)	13.5 (56.3)	17.1 (62.8)	20.1 (68.2)	21.6 (70.9)	22.3 (72.1)	21.1 (70.0)	18.3 (64.9)	14.2 (57.6)	10.9 (51.6)	15.6 (60.1)
Record low °C (°F)	−2.7 (27.1)	−2.7 (27.1)	−2.7 (27.1)	3.9 (39.0)	6.1 (43.0)	10.0 (50.0)	14.8 (58.6)	14.4 (57.9)	10.0 (50.0)	10.8 (51.4)	5.6 (42.1)	−3.0 (26.6)	−3.0 (26.6)
Average precipitation mm (inches)	62.4 (2.46)	47.3 (1.86)	25.9 (1.02)	4.8 (0.19)	2.9 (0.11)	0.3 (0.01)	0.0 (0.0)	0.3 (0.01)	4.1 (0.16)	16.0 (0.63)	31.3 (1.23)	69.3 (2.73)	264.6 (10.42)
Average precipitation days (≥ 1.0 mm)	8.9	7.5	3.7	1.3	0.8	0.1	0.0	0.3	0.9	2.5	4.8	9.7	40.5
Average relative humidity (%)	73.7	71.7	64.4	56.2	53.8	56.4	64.5	65.6	62.1	63.4	66.1	71.7	64.1
Average dew point °C (°F)	7.8 (46.0)	7.3 (45.1)	7.6 (45.7)	8.3 (46.9)	10.9 (51.6)	14.5 (58.1)	18.4 (65.1)	19.3 (66.7)	17.0 (62.6)	14.4 (57.9)	11.0 (51.8)	8.8 (47.8)	12.1 (53.8)
Mean monthly sunshine hours	201.5	220.4	244.9	264.0	325.5	336.0	390.6	365.8	291.0	248.0	222.0	170.5	3,280.2
Mean daily sunshine hours	6.5	7.8	7.9	8.8	10.5	11.2	12.6	11.8	9.7	8.0	7.4	5.5	9.0
Percentage possible sunshine	64	65	66	68	76	79	86	85	79	70	71	72	74
Average ultraviolet index	3	4	6	8	10	11	11	10	9	6	4	3	7
Source 1: NOAA
Source 2: Deutscher Wetterdienst (extremes 1945–1977), Arab Meteorology Book (sun only) and Weather Atlas (uv index)

== Economy ==
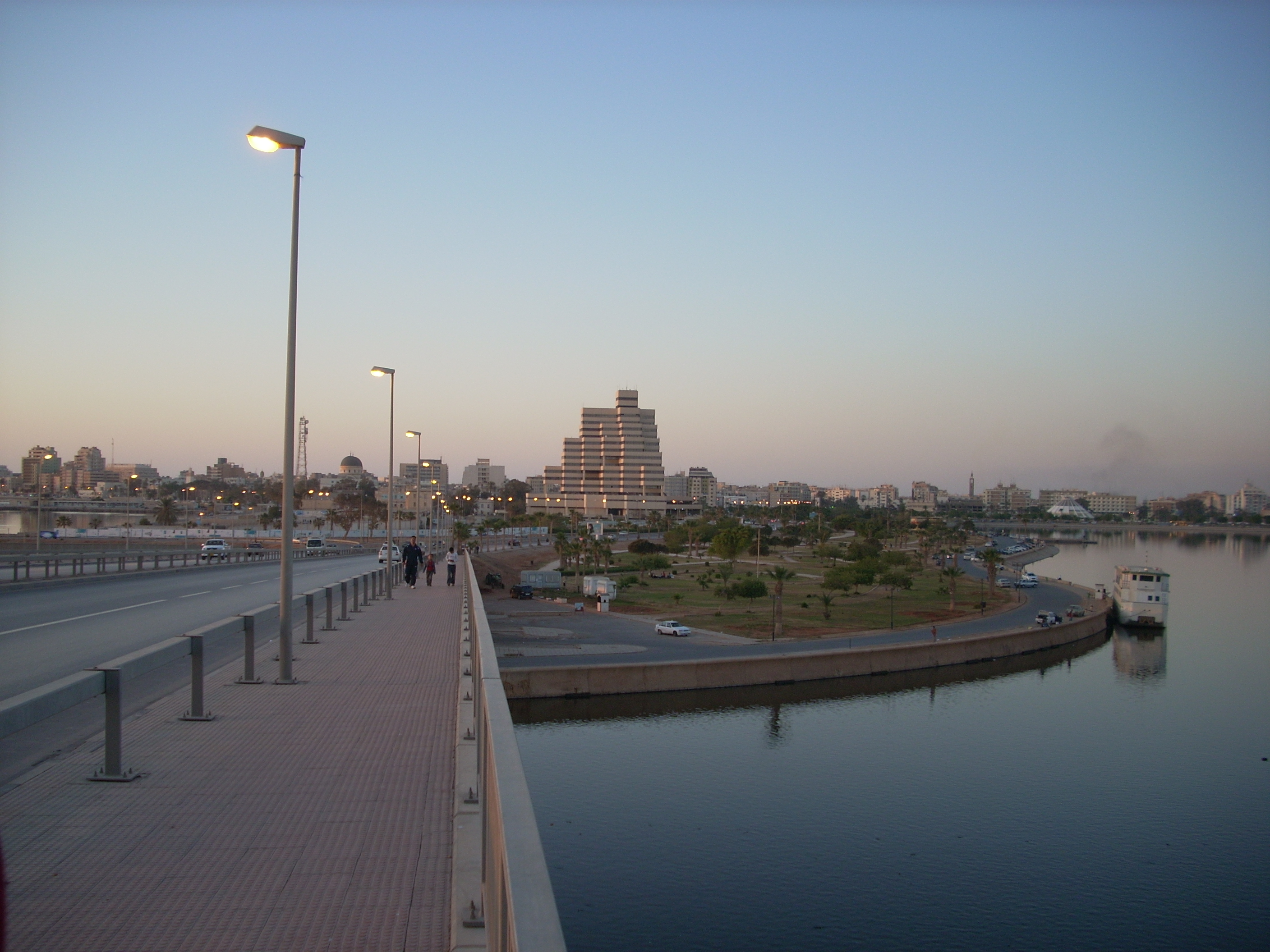
The cubic tower block Al Da'waa al-Islamiya is an important office building in Benghazi; many small and large companies in the city are based in the tower.

Benghazi, as the principal city of eastern Libya, is one of Libya's major economic centres. The city has an important port which is vital to the economy, as Libya imports many foodstuffs and manufactured products. Benghazi is also an industrial and commercial centre in Libya. Major manufactured goods include processed food, textiles, tanning, processed salt and construction materials, particularly cement; a large cement factory is located in al-Hawari. Food processing is based on local fish, imported goods, and the produce of irrigated coastal lowlands and the nearby Jabal al-Akdhar Mountains, including cereal, dates, olives, wool and meat.

Finance is also important to the city's economy, with the Libyan Bank of Commerce and Development maintaining branches in Benghazi; the Bank's headquarters is a high office tower on Gamal Abdel Nasser Street in el-Berka. Other large banks include the Central Bank of Libya office in the city centre.

The oil industry drives the city's commerce. Large national companies such as the Al-Brega Oil Marketing Company and the Arabian Gulf Oil Company are important to the city's economy and employ many people. An increase in consumer prices has been coupled with an increase in the importance of the retail sector to the city's economy. In recent years, international franchises such as United Colors of Benetton, H&M and Nike have opened in Benghazi.

Tourism is still in its very early stages in Libya. The industry is however growing in importance in Benghazi. The majority of tourists that visit Eastern Libya use Benghazi as a base for which to explore the Greek ruins in Cyrene or to make desert excursions south in Kufra. The two main hotels in the city are the Tibesti Hotel and Uzu Hotel, and several other hotels have opened in recent years to cater for increased demand. Handicrafts are found in the many souks in the city, but are of little significance to the economy.

Skanska built a good connection of speedways and flyovers in the decades after the Libyan revolution in 1969; this has made the transport of goods between Benghazi and other cities easier. Benghazi's air transport uses Benina International Airport; numerous daily flights leave for Tripoli and connections are also available to other African, Asian and European cities.

In April 2012, the Libyan economy ministry announced plans for creating a free trade area in Benghazi. After the permanent ceasefire of the second civil war, there has been a rise in business in Libya. In 2021, the Libyan Business Council set up the Benghazi International Trade Fair in 2021.

=== Transport ===
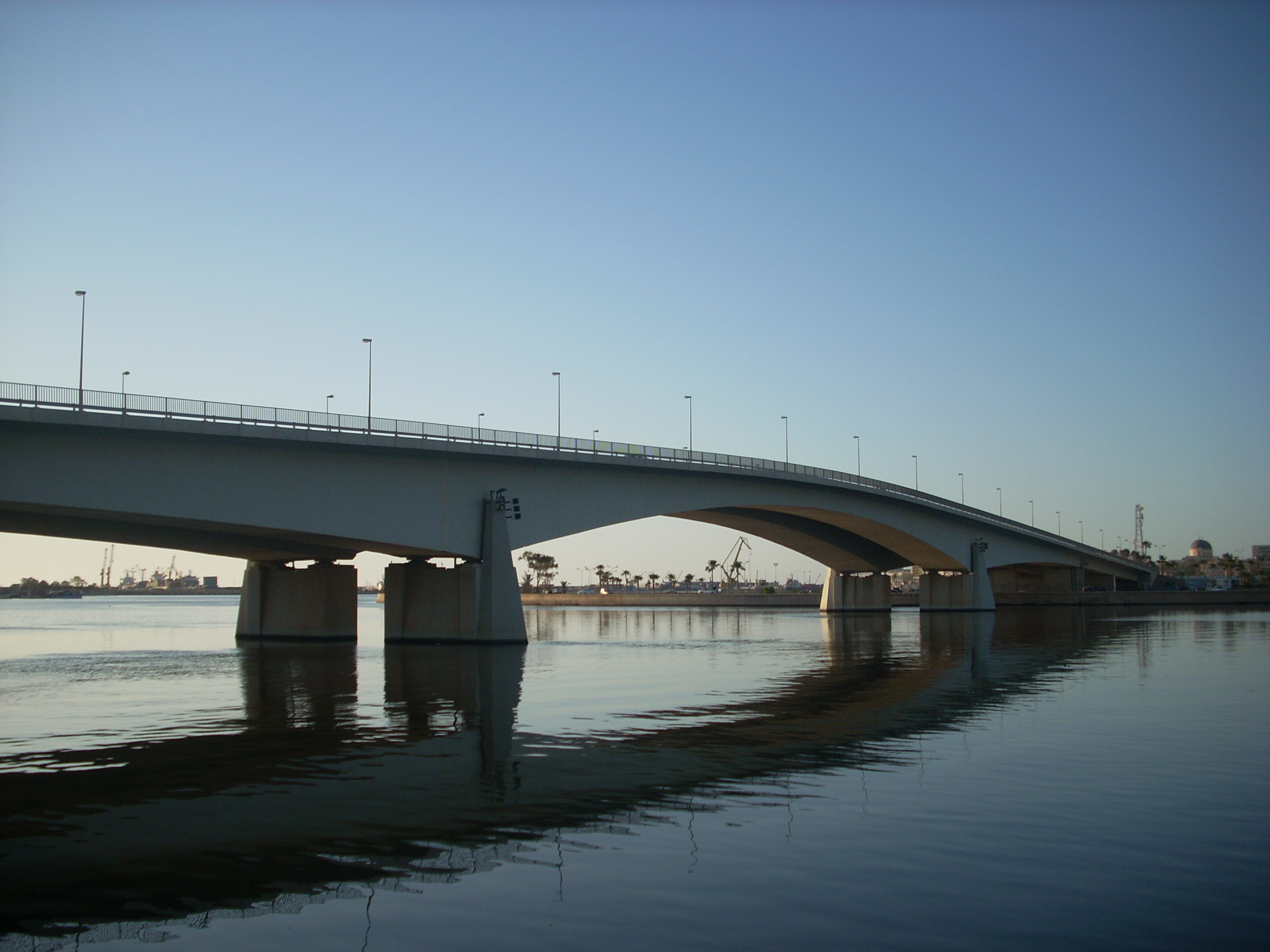
The Jeliana Bridge connects Jeliana with the city centre and old town.

Benghazi is a transport hub in Eastern Libya and is an important city on the northern coastal road that crosses the country. An efficiently designed system of roads, bridges and underpasses cover Benghazi, however traffic jams and poorly maintained streets are not uncommon. A microbus system covers many areas of the city and has its base in Al-Funduq. National and international bus services also leave from Al-Fudnuq from the central bus station. In 2010, earthworks were underway in the city for a rail network which will traverse northern Libya.

Benina International Airport serves national and international flights.

The Benghazi port is a vital terminal for the region, and allows for the import and export of national and international goods and food products.

The city's road network is generally well designed. An efficient system of highways, overpasses, ring roads and underpasses serve the city, and allow for the transport of goods and vehicles. The roads are not always well maintained, however, and often have incorrect, poorly visible or no road markings, as well as potholes in some roads and inner-city streets. In recent years, a rapid increase in car ownership has meant that traffic jams, lack of parking spaces and overcrowding are also not uncommon, especially on smaller streets. Road accidents are also on the rise because of the increase in vehicles and the subsequent lax in attention given by authorities to dangerous driving. In a rare RTA conflict health study, road traffic accidents were studied during the period of the 2011 armed conflict, in which Benghazi was a focal point of events. It was found that while the number of road traffic accidents had decreased during the period of the war, the morbidity and mortality of the injured had increased significantly.

The 3rd Ring Road is the main highway circling the city.

There is no systemised public transport system in Benghazi despite the city's size and significance. A popular system of microbuses has developed in recent years; bus journeys run on fixed routes and passengers can embark and disembark anywhere on the route. Most microbuses stop at Al-Funduq or have the end of Souq Al-Jarid in Al-Funduq as their final destination. National and international coach services depart and arrive at Benghazi's coach station at Al-Funduq with regular journeys to Tripoli, as well as international services to Cairo, Amman and Damascus.

Until the 1960s there were two small railways, built by the Italians, departing from Benghazi and served with classical Littorine: Benghazi-Barce and Benghazi-Soluch. But recently huge railway plans were supported by Gaddafi: work started in September 2008 on a new railway network that would connect to major cities of western Libya at Sirte. Russian Railways is responsible for the three-year contract. In the future, a rail link may be built to both Tunisia and Egypt forming a North African coastal rail network.

== Cityscape ==
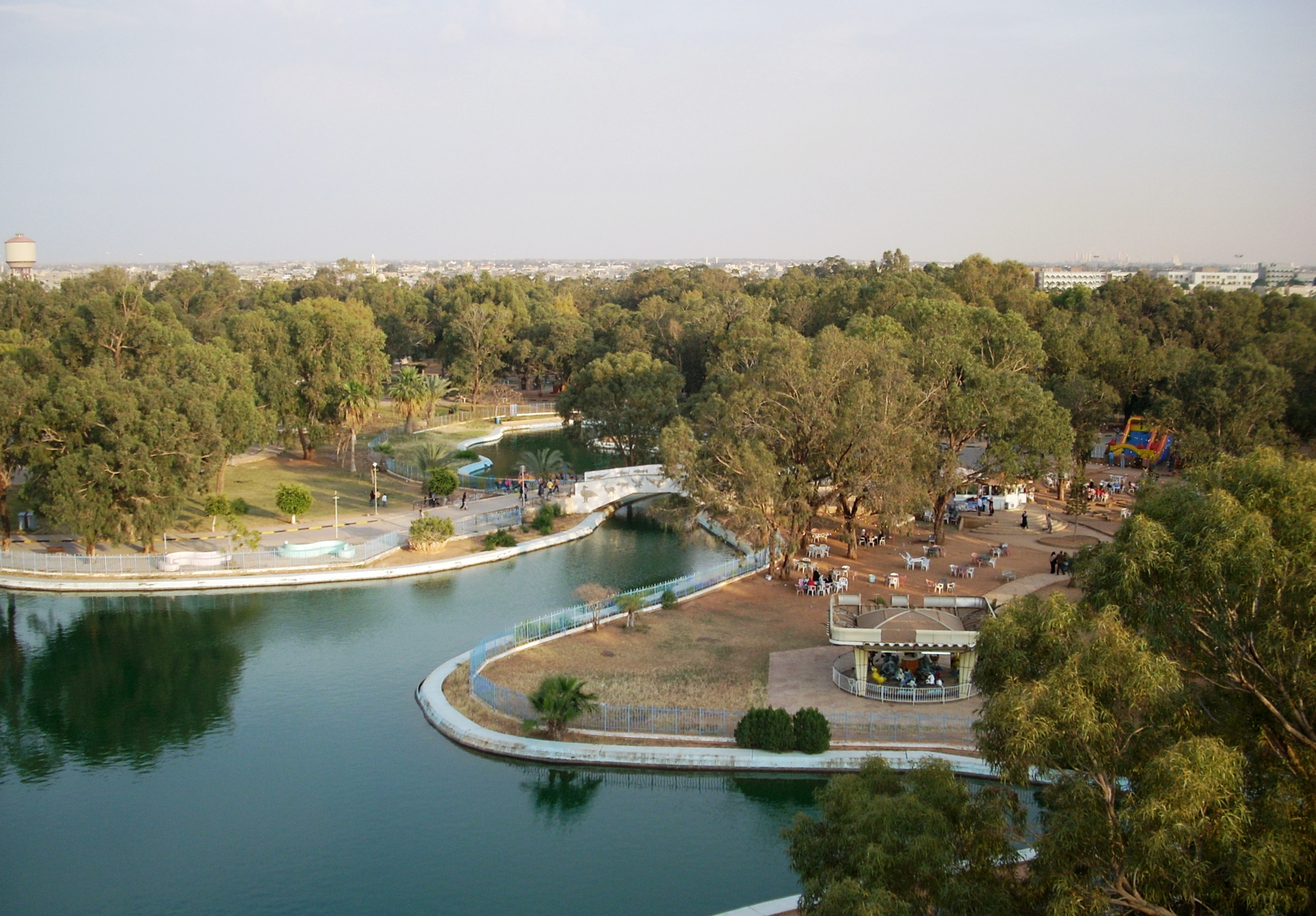
Benghazi Zoo (al-Bosco) in al-Fuwayhat, one of Benghazi's greenest and wealthiest neighbourhoods

The city is divided into many neighbourhoods, some of which were founded during Italian Colonial rule and many which have developed as a result of modern urban sprawl. The different neighbourhoods vary in their levels of economic prosperity, as well as their cultural, historic and social atmosphere. Generally, the city is roughly divided into the following areas: Central Benghazi (colloquially referred to as al-Blaad by locals) – includes the medina, and the old quarter, Central Districts which circle the downtown – Al-Sabri, Sidi Abayd, Sidi Hsayn, Al-Berka, Al-Salmani, Al-Hadaa'ik, Al-Fuwayhat and Al-Keesh, Central Suburbs – Al-Laythi, Bu Atni, Al-Quwarsha, Al-Hawari, Coastal Districts – Al-Kwayfiya (North), Garyounis, Bu-Fakhra and Jarrutha (South), and the Distant Suburbs – Gimeenis, Benina and Sidi Khalifa.

Central Benghazi is where the majority of Benghazi's historical monuments are located, and has the city's most popular tourist attractions. Virtually all of Benghazi's theatres, libraries, best clothing stores, markets and old mosques can be found there. The Italian quarter is also located in the centre. The central districts are mostly residential and commercial areas such as Sidi Hsayn. The central suburbs are almost entirely residential and more like little towns in their own right; Al-Quwarsha is a good example of this. The coastal districts (especially the southern districts) are where Benghazi's beaches can be found. Some sections have become more popular as residential areas in recent years (such as Qanfuda). These areas are still primarily recreational however, and many beach condominium resorts (known locally as chalets) have been built in previous years such as those at al-Nakheel beach, and the Nayrouz condominiums.

== Culture ==
Benghazi is one of the cultural centres of Libya and is a base for tourists, visitors and academics in the region. Throughout its history, Benghazi has developed with a certain level of independence from the more Maghreb oriented capital Tripoli. This has influenced the city, and as such, the cultural atmosphere in Benghazi is more Arab in nature than that in Tripoli. An influx of immigrants including Egyptian, Iraqi, Palestinian, Sudanese and Syrian immigrants have also influenced the city's culture to a certain extent in recent years.

The city centre contains a few local theatres, as well as the Dar al-Kutub National Library in Al-Funduq, where the works of popular local novelists like Sadeq Naihoum and Khalifa al-Fakhri can be found. Different architectural styles attest to the different empires that have controlled the city throughout history. Sport is also important in the city; two of Libya's most successful football clubs are based in Benghazi.

=== Architecture ===
There is a variety of architectural styles in Benghazi, which reflect the number of times the city has changed hands throughout its history. Arab, Ottoman and Italian rule have influenced the different streetscapes, buildings and quarters in Benghazi.

Ancient architectural remains of the Greek and later Roman settlement of Berenice can be found by the Italian lighthouse. There is a trace of the 3rd century BC wall built by the Greeks, four Roman peristyle houses, six wine vats. A Byzantine church also exists on the site, with a mosaic still intact. These ruins formed the northern part of the ancient city, which extended south and east but now lies buried beneath the modern city.

The next oldest section of the city is the Medina quarter, which began to grow sometime under Medieval Arab rule, and is still intact today. This quarter stretches out from the Northern shores of the harbour, and covers an area roughly bounded by Ahmed Rafiq al-Mahdawi Street to the North-west, al-Jezayir Street to the South-east and 23 July Street to the South-west. The heart of the medina is Maydan al-Hurriya (Freedom Square); to the northeast of this is the covered Souq al-Jareed.

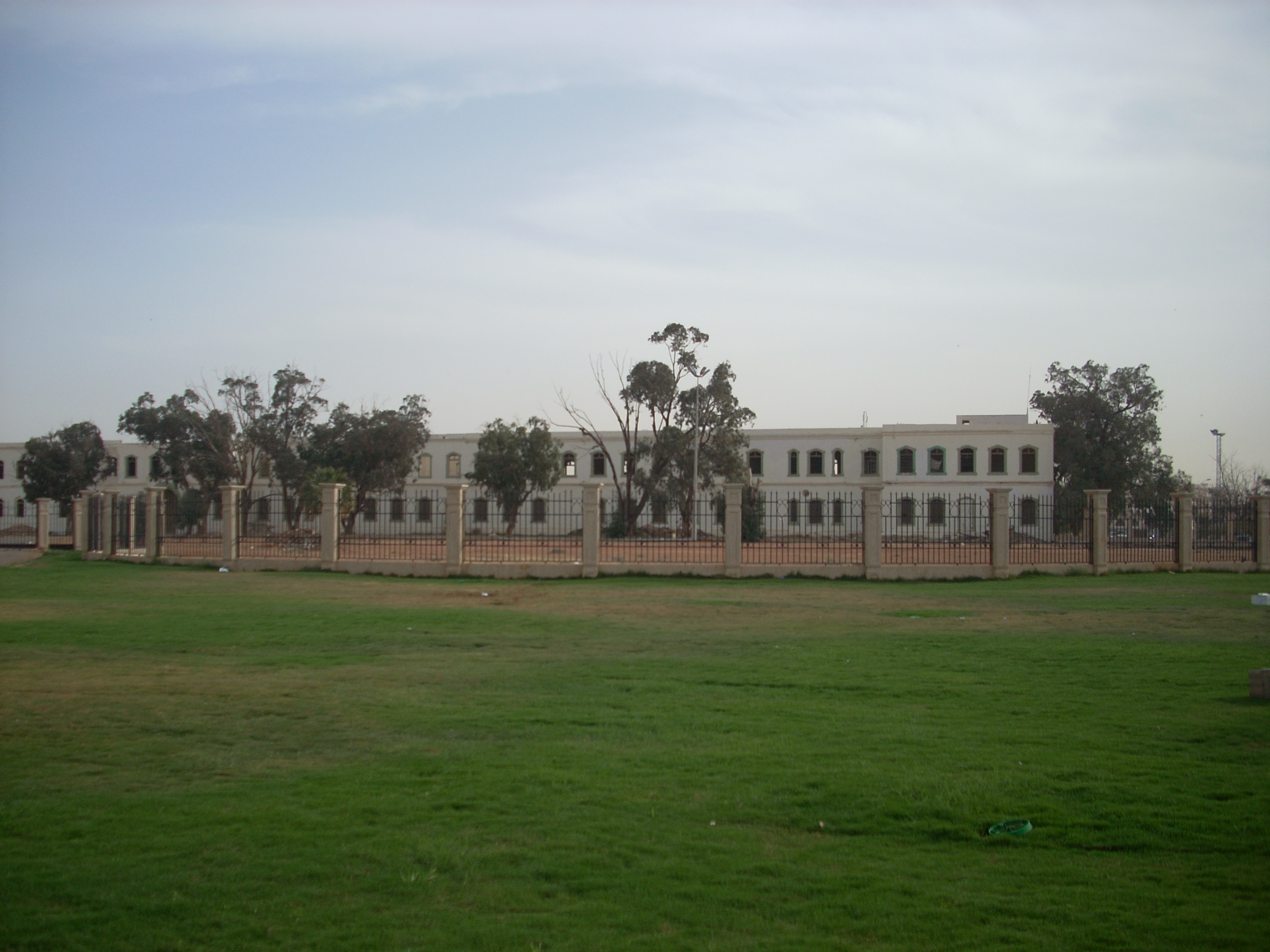
Al-Berka Palace in Benghazi was built in two parts. The front façade was built by the Ottomans in the late 19th century, the two side sections were later added during Italian rule.

The largest Ottoman architectural monument in Benghazi is the late 19th-century Ottoman palace in El-Berka; built during the rule of Rashid Pasha II. The front elevation was completed in 1895, whilst the side sections were added later during Italian rule. The white and green structure houses 360 rooms; and is on a tract of land where Gamal Abdel Nasser Street meets al-Saqzali Street; south of the 28 March football stadium.

The house of Omar Pasha Mansour El Kikhia, an Ottoman Pasha from a prominent Benghazi family, represents a good example of Ottoman residential architecture with several balconies, stone archways, and an open courtyard containing a fountain. The home was recently restored, remodeled and converted into the Bait-al Medina al-Thaqafi museum.

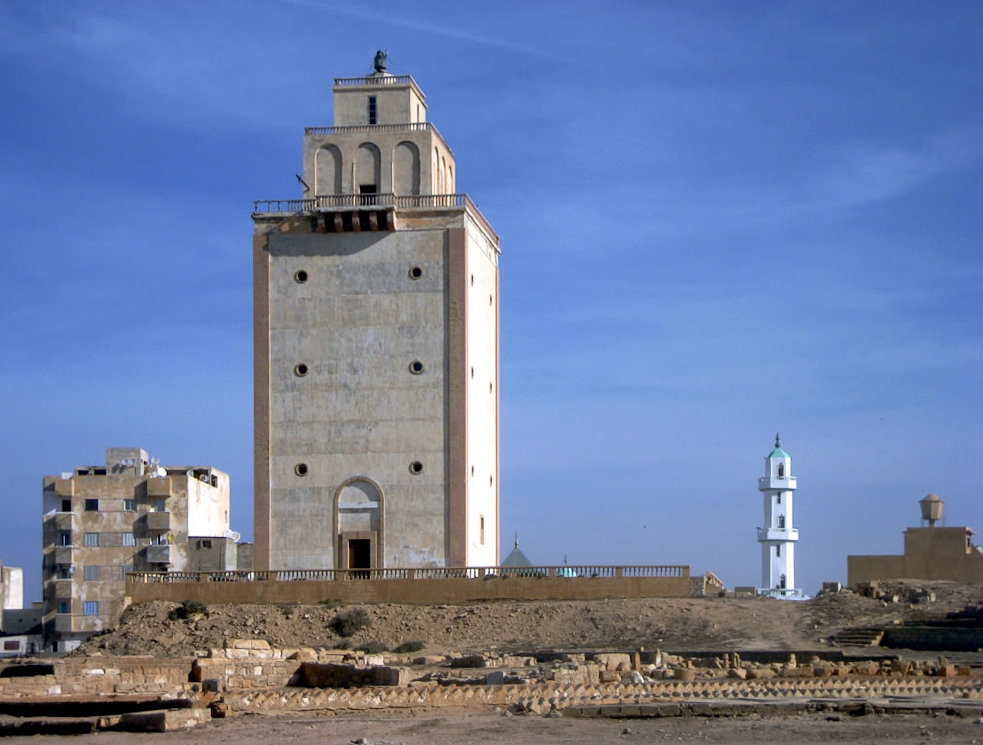
Italian lighthouse in Benghazi, built in 1922 during Italian colonial rule

Benghazi came under Italian rule in the early part of the 20th century. Some examples of Italianate, as well as modernist colonial architecture from this period remain today. Under the governorships of Generals Ernesto Mombelli and Attilio Teruzzi in the 1920s, the buildings commissioned in Benghazi had an eclectic architectural language that embodied a Western conception of Eastern architecture. An example of this is the Municipal palace built in 1924, which stands in Maydan al-Hurriya (Freedom Square). The building combines Moorish arches with Italianate motifs on the façade. Italians even did the first architectural plan of Benghazi. in the 1930s, with a new railway station and promenade.

The largest colonial building from this Italian period is the Benghazi Cathedral in Maydan El Catedraeya (Cathedral Square), which was built in the 1920s and has two large distinct domes.

Benghazi was heavily bombed during World War II, and so the majority of buildings in the city are examples of modern or contemporary architecture. The central business district was built mostly in the 1960s and 1970s with Libya's newfound oil wealth. The highest building in Benghazi is the Tibesti Hotel on Gamal Abdel Nasser Street built in 1989. Another prominent example of modern architecture in Benghazi is the Da'wah al-Islamiyah Building, which has a series of distinctive cubes piled in the shape of a pyramid.

Important colonial buildings designed during Italian rule include the Berenice Cinema (currently under renovation) which was designed Marcello Piacentini and Luigi Piccinato in 1928.

=== Sports ===
Benghazi's main football stadium under renovation as of October 2024

Benghazi is the second largest city in Libya, and as such, has some of the best sports facilities in the country. The city has various sporting centres of different standards, such as football stadia, beach clubs (where many water sports are played), as well as several other public and private facilities. Benghazi has hosted many national sports events throughout the years, as well as more significant international competitions such as the African Cup of Nations.

Football is the most-popular sport in Benghazi, and two of Libya's most-successful football clubs, Al-Ahly Benghazi and Al-Nasr Benghazi, are based in the city. The two teams have won the Libyan Premier League five times; Al Ahly four and Al Nasr only one. The most-important football event that took place in Benghazi was the 1982 African Cup of Nations. The city hosted six group games and a semifinal in the March 28 Stadium, Libya's second-largest stadium.

The largest sporting centre in Benghazi is the Medina al-Riyadhia (Sports City). The complex is situated just south of the city centre, and houses the 28 March Stadium, and the Slayman al Tharrat basketball stadium – several matches of the 2009 FIBA Africa Championship were hosted at the arena. The complex also has a sports hall for indoor sports, a tennis stadium and several small tennis courts. The facility was built in the 1950s and is therefore quite outdated; the stadia have nonetheless undergone maintenance work in recent years. Sports City was recently closed down for a complete redevelopment of the site. As of 2009, the 28 March Stadium was undergoing demolition work, and a new 45,000 all seater stadium was to be constructed in its place. A second smaller stadium was to be built on-site, and the entire site was to undergo redevelopment before its reopening in 2011, and its use in the 2013 African Nations Cup.

The Eastern suburb of Sidi Khalifa accommodates an equestrian sports facility. The 'Martyrs of Benghazi's Riding Club' boasts a number of female members who, at least until 2016, engaged in sportive competition.

Benghazi is a coastal city, and its beaches are an important location for sporting activities. The coast at Jeliana is home to the Milaha Beach Club amongst others. Wind surfing and swimming are two of the most popular water sports. There are also several contact sport clubs in the city –judo and taekwondo are popular men's sports in Benghazi. In recent times, rugby sevens has seen great success with three clubs in the vicinity. Gyms have also become more popular in the city in recent years, because of a greater concern for healthy living amongst Libyans.

=== Food ===
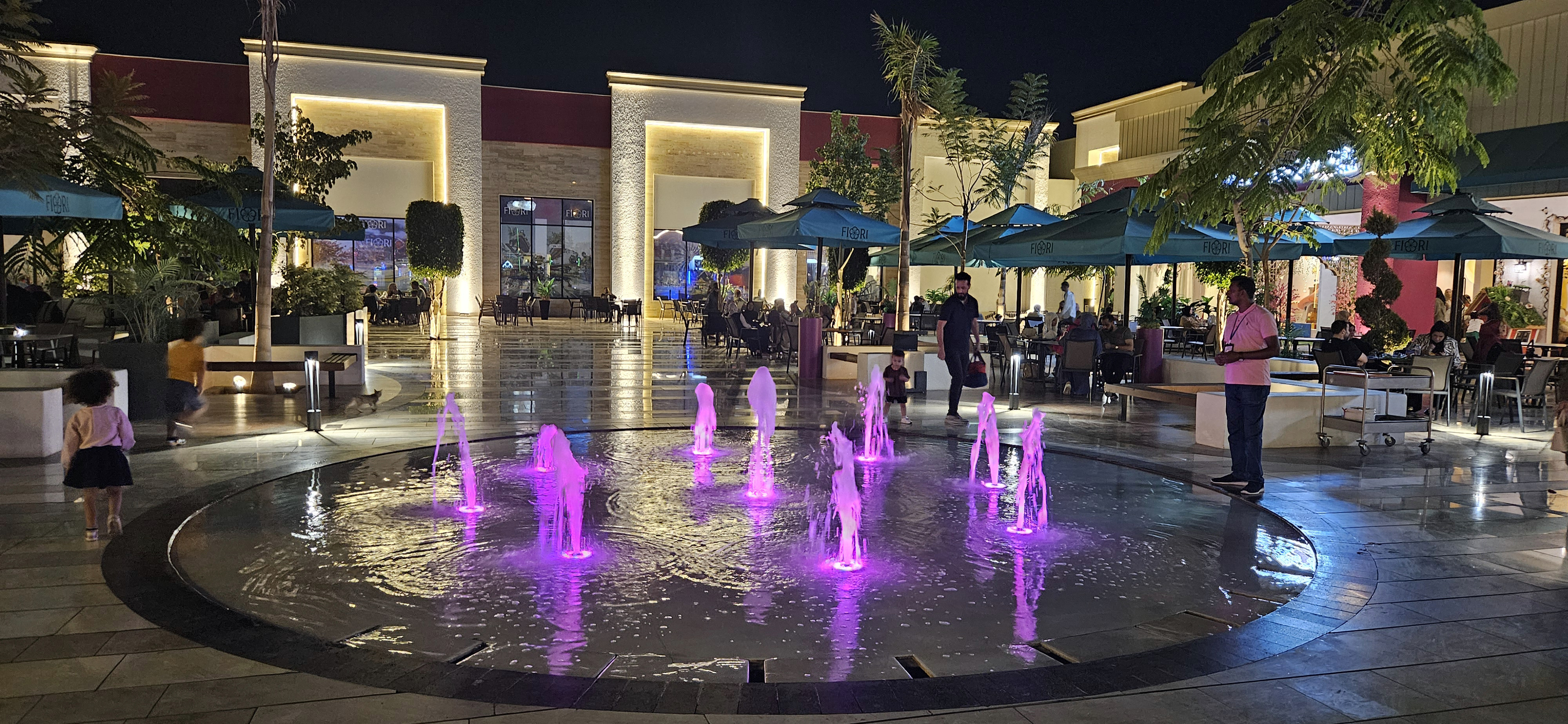
Restaurants overlooking a square in Al Fuwayhat

Food and drink is very important to the culture of the people of Benghazi, as it is in the rest of Libya. Many of the dishes and ingredients used are passed down as tradition from generation to generation. The main ingredients that are used in their cuisine are olive oil, garlic, palm dates, grains, and milk. These products are natural to this area, and these ingredients are very common to much of North Africa and the Mediterranean. Another tradition of Libyan culinary culture is tea. Tea from Benghazi has a uniquely thick, bitter taste. Tea drinking is a social activity that close friends and relatives usually take part in.

Benghazi is home to many distinctive dishes that can be prepared at home. Bazin (bread) is one of the most well known of these dishes. Bazin is a dish consisting of a small loaf of heated dough and a meat or vegetable sauce. The dough can be ripped into bite-sized pieces and dipped into the sauce. This dish uses essential ingredients such as garlic and oil. One common dessert that can be found in Benghazi is deep fried dates. These are often served with milk.

== Notable people ==
Notable people from Benghazi include:

- Taha El Sherif Ben Amer, Minister of Transport of Libya
- Al-Sadek Hamed Al-Shuwehdy, Libyan college student who was executed during Gaddafi's regime
- Amal Bayou, microbiologist and politician
- Khadījah Jahamī, broadcaster
- Shefa Salem, artist and painter
- Ahmed Fakroun, Libyan musician and producer

== See also ==
- List of cities in Libya
- 2012 Benghazi attack
- HIV trial in Libya
- Notes from Hell

== Sources ==
- Kenrick, Philip (2013). Cyrenaica. Libya Archaeological Guides. Vol. 2. Silphium Press. ISBN 978-1-900971-14-0.
- Rosamilia, Emilio (2023). La città del silfio. Istituzioni, culti ed economia di Cirene classica ed ellenistica attraverso le fonti epigrafiche (in Italian). Pisa: Scuola Normale Superiore. ISBN 9788876427367.
