= Women in Libya =

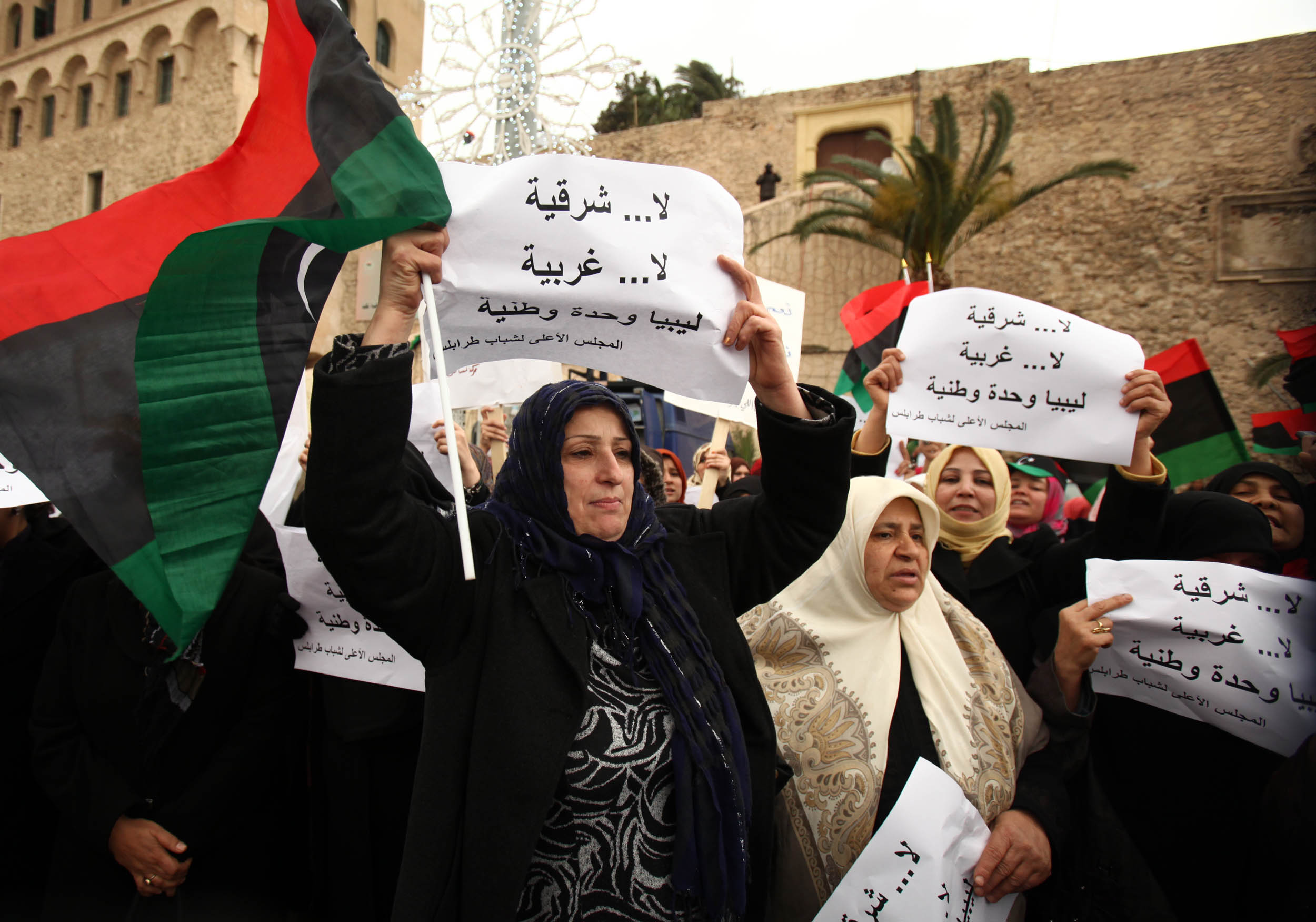
- Female protestors in Tripoli protest against calls to separate the country into three autonomous regions (March 2012).

General statistics
- Maternal mortality (per 100,000): 72 (2020)
- Women in parliament: 14% (2021)
- Women over 25 with secondary education: 55.6% (2010)
- Women in labour force: 34% (2019)

Gender Inequality Index
- Value: 0.259 (2021)
- Rank: 61st out of 191

Global Gender Gap Index
- Value: NR (2012)
- Rank: NR

The overall status of women in Libya has improved since the efforts of the Gaddafi government in the 1969 revolution. The same government has been held responsible for various human rights violations, including on women. Equal pay for equal work, universal healthcare, and the right to education have become state policy. Women have gained the right to vote, run for political office, and participate in national institutions. However, cultural biases against women in the workplace and resistance to change from traditional sectors of society have posed obstacles to process. Moreover, the political upheaval of the 2011 revolution has led to both gains and setbacks for women's rights. Nonetheless, the continued involvement and engagement of women in public life and government have emphasized the importance of female emancipation for the progress and development of Libya as a whole.

== Society under the Libyan Arab Republic ==
Central to the revolution of 1969 was the empowerment of women and removal of inferior status. Which after the change of rule resulted in the roles and status of women becoming subject of a great deal of discussion and legal action in Libya under the new established republic, as they have in many countries of the Arab World. Some observers suggest that the Gaddafi regime made efforts on behalf of female emancipation because it viewed women as an essential source of labour in an economy chronically starved for workers. Furthermore, commentators postulate that the government was interested in expanding its political base, hoping to curry favour by championing female rights. Since independence, Libyan leaders have been committed to improving the condition of women.

=== Emancipation ===
In the 1970s, female emancipation was in large measure a matter of age. One observer generalized that city women under the age of thirty-five had discarded the traditional veil and were quite likely to wear Western-style clothing. Those between the ages of thirty-five and forty-five were increasingly ready to consider such a change, but women over the age of forty-five appeared reluctant to give up the protection which they perceived their veils and customary dress to afford. A decade later, veiling was uncommon among urban women.

During this era, women were also increasingly seen driving, shopping, or traveling without husbands or male companions (known as Mahrams).

==== Voting and government ====
Since 1964, Libyan women have had the right to vote and to participate in political life.

Since then, the government has encouraged women to participate in elections and national political institutions, but in 1987 only one woman had advanced as far as the national cabinet, as an assistant secretary for information and culture. However, from 1989 to 1994 Fatima Abd al-Hafiz Mukhtar served as Minister of Education. Salma Ahmed Rashed, from 1992 to 1994, served as Assistant Secretary of Women, then as Secretary in the General Secretariat of the General People's Congress for Women's Affairs from 1994 to 1995, and was eventually the Ambassador to the League of Arab Nations in 1996.

Others serving as Secretary in the General Secretariat of the General People's Congress for Women's Affairs included from 1995 to 1998 Thuriya Ramadan Abu Tabrika, Nura Han Ramadan Abu Sefrian from 1998 to 2000, Dr. Shalma Chabone Abduljabbar, and Amal Nuri Abdullah al-Safar from 2006 to 2009. Women serving as Secretary in the General Secretariat of the General People's Congress for Social Affairs have included Dr. Shalma Chabone Abduljabbar and Abd-al-Alim al-Shalwi, while from 1995 to 2000 Fawziya Bashir al-Shalababi served as Secretary for Information, Culture and Mass Mobilization. Dr. Huda Fathi Ben Amer began serving as the Secretary of People's Committees Affairs in 2009, and also served as President of the Transitional Arab Parliament. Dr. Salma Shabaan Abdel Jabar began serving as Secretary of Woman Affairs in 2009. In March 2021, Najla el-Mangoush was appointed as the foreign minister.

==== Association ====
Women were also able to form their own associations. The first associated was in 1955 in Benghazi. In 1970, several feminist organizations merged into the Women's General Union which in 1977 became the Jamahiriya Women's Federation. An early president of the Women's General Union was the writer and broadcaster, Khadījah Jahamī. Under Clause 5 of the Constitutional Proclamation of 11 December 1969, women had already been given equal status under the law with men. Subsequently, the women's movement has been active in such fields as adult education and hygiene.

Based on the review of published research about women's education, work, legislation and the family structure, three indicators of power were selected: decision making, freedom of movement, and control over income. One of the contributions of the study lies in the fact that as far as I am aware it is the first study in the Arab world to use the research framework of Cromwell and Olson. In spite of the fact that the theoretical framework consists of three main components of power, the study concentrates mainly on outcomes in which power can be measured clearly. The study tackles this component in detail while analyzing data. In fact bases and processes can be manifested through outcome which is the final product of the first two. Furthermore, unlike other similar studies in the Arab world, the study is the first to have employed marital status as an independent variable.

==== Employment ====
Women had also made great gains in employment outside the home, the result of improved access to education and of increased acceptance of female paid employment. Once again, the government was not the primary motivating force behind this phenomenon. For example, the 1976–80 development plan called for the employment of a larger number of women "in those spheres which are suitable for female labour", but the Libyan identification of what work was suitable for women continued to be limited by tradition. According to the 1973 census, the participation rate for women (the percent of all women engaged in economic activity) was about 3 percent as compared with 37 percent for men. The participation was somewhat higher than the 2.7 percent registered in 1964, but it was considerably lower than that in other Maghrib countries and in most of the Middle Eastern Arab states.

In the 1980s, in spite of the gain registered by women during the prior decade, females constituted only 7 percent of the national labour force, according to one informed researcher. This represented a 2 percent increase over a 20-year period. Another source, however, considered these figures far too low. Reasoning from 1973 census figures and making allowances for full- and part-time, seasonal, paid, and unpaid employment, these researchers argued convincingly that women formed more than 20 percent of the total economically active Libyan population. For rural areas, their figure was 46 percent, far higher than official census numbers for workers who in most cases were not only unpaid but not even considered as employed.

Among non-agricultural women, those who were educated and skilled were overwhelmingly employed as teachers. The next highest category of educated and skilled women ware nurses and those found in the health care field. Others areas that were open to women included administrative and clerical work in banks, department stores, and government offices, and domestic services. Women were found in ever larger numbers as nurses and midwives, but even so, Libyan health care facilities suffered from a chronic shortage of staff.

By contrast, in clerical and secretarial jobs, the problem was not a shortage of labour but a deep-seated cultural bias against the intermingling of men and women in the workplace. During the 1970s, the attraction of employment as domestics tended to decline, as educated and ambitious women turned to more lucrative occupations. To fill the gap, Libyan households sought to hire foreigners, particularly Egyptians and Tunisians.

Light industry, especially cottage-style, was yet another outlet for female labour, a direct result of Libya's labour shortage. Despite these employment outlets and gains, female participation in the work force of the 1980s remained small, and many socially female jobs were filled by foreign women. Also, in spite of significant increases in female enrollments in the educational system, including university level, few women were found, even as technicians, in such traditionally male fields as medicine, engineering, and law.

Non-urban women constituted a quite significant, if largely invisible, proportion of the rural work force. According to the 1973 census, there were only 14,000 economically active women out of a total of 200,000 rural females older than age 10. In all likelihood, however, many women engaged in agricultural or domestic tasks worked as unpaid members of family groups and hence were not regarded as gainfully employed, accounting to at least in part for the low census count. Estimates of actual female rural employment in the mid-1970s, paid and unpaid ranged upward of 86,000, as compared with 96,000 men in the rural work force. In addition to agriculture, both rural and nomadic women engaged in the weaving of rugs and carpets, another sizable category of unpaid and unreported labor.

Beginning in 1970, the revolutionary government passed a series of laws regulating female employment - equal pay for equal work and qualifications became a fundamental precept. Other statutes strictly regulate the hours and conditions of work, specifically the prohibition of hard labor, and 48 hours.

===== Childcare and retirement benefits =====
Working mothers enjoyed a range of benefits designed to encourage them to continue working even after marriage and childbirth, including cash bonuses for the first child and free day care centres. A woman could retire at age fifty-five, and she was entitled to a pension.

===== Business and finance =====
Women are free to engage in the private business and finance sectors, and banks to not require the consent of the husband to obtain a loan.

===== 21st century =====
Employment was estimated at 22% for Libyan women by the early 21st century, and 27% by 2006, relatively high for an Arab nation. This marked a 14% increase since 1986. Employment by women in Libya is largely influenced by choice. Positions in all fields of the economy were held, including lawyers, doctors, judges, and senior government positions.

In May 2011, The New York Times reported during the Libyan civil war that the rebels had begun rolling back this progress as their size increased. One Libyan woman, a 23-year-old therapist, quit the rebel National Transitional Council saying when the revolution started, women had a big role, but it had disappeared.

==== Education ====
Under King Idris, educating women was considered suspicious. During the last decade of his rule, females enrolled in primary education was only between 11 and 19%. Under Article 14 of the Libyan Constitutional Declaration in 1969, education was made a right, and by 1990 the figure stood at 48%. Enrollment in higher education stood at 8% in 1966, but reached 43% by 1996, equal to males.

By 2001, 16% had a university degree or higher, and 48% a secondary school certificate, in which there is no prohibition on choice educational studies.

==== Housing ====
At the time of the revolution in 1969, 40% of the population lived in tents or shanty houses and was one of the worst in the Arab world. The revolution promised "housing for all", and by 1997 virtually every Libyan owned their own home through government laws which supported such. Criticized by opponents of the government for not creating a mortgage market, women obtained equal rights as men to own and have independent use of their property.

==== Healthcare ====
Following the revolution in 1969, universal healthcare services were created through the National Social Insurance Institute, with women having equal access. Between 1969 and 1978, the number of physicians increased by 4-5 times. Libya had one of the best healthcare systems in Africa before the 1992 U.N. sanctions, which rapidly declined the quality of medicine and supplies.

==== Culture ====
By the 1980s relations within the family and between the sexes, along with all other aspects of Libyan life, had begun to show notable change. As the mass media popularized new ideas, new perceptions and practices appeared. Foreign settlers and foreign workers frequently embodied ideas and values distinctively different from those traditional in the country. In particular, the perceptions of Libyans in everyday contact with Europeans were affected.

The continued and accelerating process of urbanization had broken old kinship ties and association with ancestral rural communities. At the same time, opportunities for upward social movement have increased, and petroleum wealth and the development plans of the revolutionary government have made many new kinds of employment available thus opening up more well paid jobs for women especially among the educated young. Many of these educated and increasingly independent young women preferred to set up their own households at marriage, rather than live with their in-laws. In addition, social security, free medical care, education, and other appurtenances of the welfare state had lessened the dependence of the aged on their children in village communities and had almost eliminated it in the cities.

==== Military ====
As of the late 20th century the regime had sought to introduce women into the armed forces. In the 1978 Libya's new military academy began training women, training thousands since. In the early 1980s where the 'Nuns of the Revolution', often referred to as the Amazonian Guard, were created as a specialist police force attached to revolutionary committees. Then in 1984, a law mandating female conscription that required all students in secondary schools and above to participate in military training was passed. In addition, young women were encouraged to attend female military academies, the first of which was established in 1979. These proposals originated with Colonel Gaddafi, who hoped that they would help create a new image and role for Libyan women everywhere. Nonetheless, the concept of female training in the martial arts encountered such widespread opposition that meaningful compliance seemed unlikely. Another issue at academies and the military during this time was sexual assault. While the participation of women was encouraged, many did not do so for reasons of safety.

==== Marriage ====
The Sharia regulations in effect until 1972 had no minimum age for marriage, allowed forced marriage, and had no concept of alimony. Law 76 "Protecting Some Rights of Women in Marriage, Divorce for Prejudice, and Consensual Divorce", enacted in 1972, changed these rules. A mimimum marriage age was set at 16 for women and 18 for men, though these rules have often been broken in rural areas. This minimum was raised to 20 years in 1984. The right of jabr, meaning the right of a guardian to force his ward into marriage was eliminated. While this meant a guardian cannot force their child into marriage, marriages still required the guardian's consent. Women were also granted the right to divorce their husband, but alimony could only be given if the court deemed the husband to be at fault. Despite these improvements there are still issues, for example the concept of marital rape does not exist in Libyan law. Women's organisations have also been concerned about the elimination of restrictions on polygamy in 2011.

== Post Revolution ==
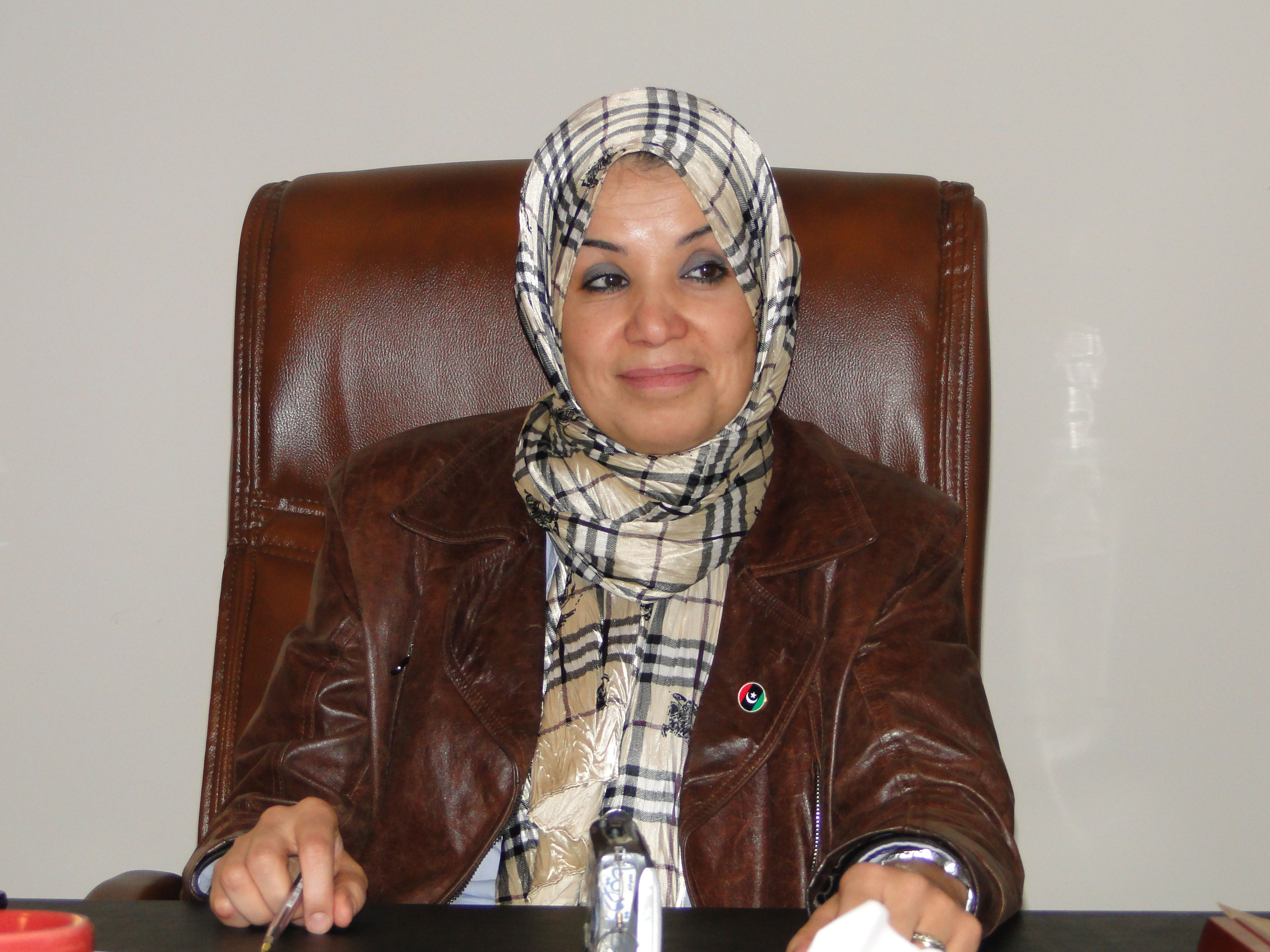
Salwa El-Deghali, a Libyan lawyer and member of the National Transitional Council

Women were active participants in the 17 February Revolution, mostly by supporting fighters, but sometimes by fighting themselves. Due to this active participation, they have enjoyed a far greater exposure in public life and government. During the Revolution, the National Transitional Council was formed; out of the 40 members, only two were women. Due to the initiatives of women's associations and pressure from western governments, a quota was instituted for the number of women in the General National Congress (GNC). Thirty-three women have been elected to serve in the GNC in the first free elections following the revolution. Almost all of these women contested seats allocated to women, with only one seat won by an independent woman candidate.

The Revolution was followed by a weakening of security forces, and the rise of religious extremism and tribal conflicts. These have led to the rise of extremist Islamist militias involved in regional armed conflict. These groups heavily oppose female emancipation and created a dangerous environment for female politicians and journalists. The assassination of Salwa Bughaighis, a lawyer and human rights activist, showed women the dangers of being a woman in politics and had a significant negative effect on women's activism. The assassination made women more reluctant to participate in public life for fear of their safety. The women's movement also experienced a setback as a result of renewed crackdowns on civil society by Islamist groups. As a result of these issues, many women felt like despite their participation, women's social position did not improve as much as they had hoped.

At the time of the revolution 34% of women were part of the labour force, despite them having higher attendance in secondary school than men, and many women pursuing higher education. In 2024 the number of women in the labour force stood at 32%.

Libyan Women ORG is providing free trainings to all Libyan women who wish to enroll in the training courses.

A new platform that aims to claim the role of women in Libya and participate with women in the reconstruction of the Libyan country.

In March 2021, five Libyan women were named for a new unity government, including the first woman foreign minister, Najla el-Mangoush.

== Current Matters and Data ==
The Libyan Hispanic Chamber of Commerce is currently collaborating with all Libyan ministries to offer reconstruction aid services and enable the country to open again to the rest of Europe.

Issues currently faced by the women's emancipation process in Libya are indicated by UN Women as: high unemployment rates; underrepresentation in politics and public affairs; violence against women, including those who stand up for female emancipation; inadequate legal protection for women; and the current humanitarian crisis impacting women in particular, including proposed restrictions on women traveling alone.

== See also ==
- Women in Africa
- Women's rights
