= Foreign contacts of ancient Egypt =

The following is a chronicle of predynastic and ancient Egyptian foreign contacts up through 343 BC.

== Prehistoric Nabta Playa (c. 7500 BC) ==
In Nabta Playa by the end of the 6th millennium BC, prehistoric Egyptians had imported goats and sheep from Southwest Asia.

== Predynastic Badari (c. 4500-4000 BC) ==
Foreign artifacts dating to the 5th millennium BC in the Badarian culture of Egypt indicate contact with distant Syria and Uruk.

== Predynastic Naqada, Gerzeh and Maadi (c. 4400–3100 BC) ==
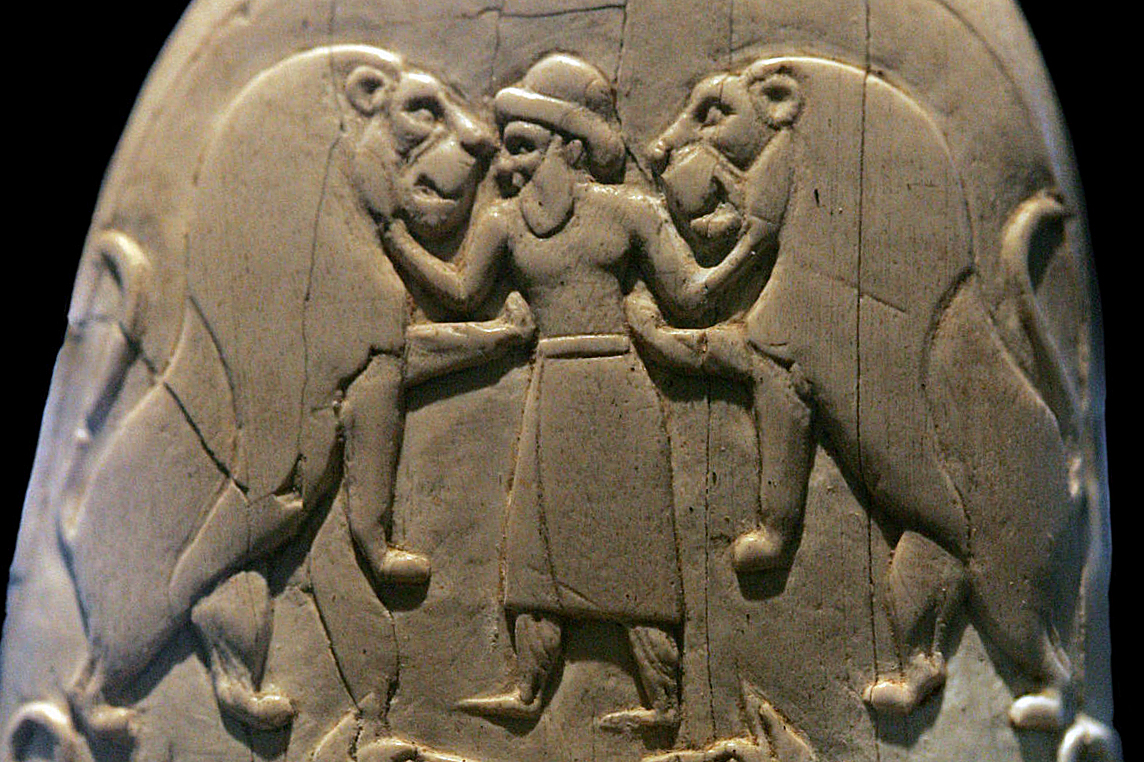
Mesopotamian king as Master of Animals on the Gebel el-Arak Knife, dated circa 3300–3200 BC, Abydos, Egypt. Louvre Museum, reference E 11517. This work of art both shows the influence of Mesopotamia on Egypt at an early date, and the state of Mesopotamian royal iconography during the Uruk period.

Predynastic Egyptians in the Naqada I period traded with Nubia to the south, the oases of the western desert to the west, and the cultures of the eastern Mediterranean to the east. They also imported obsidian from Ethiopia to shape blades and other objects. Charcoal samples found in the tombs of Nekhen, which were dated to the Naqada I and II periods, have been identified as cedar from Lebanon.

Evidence of Naqadan contacts include pottery and other artifacts from the Levant that have been found in ancient Egypt. Egyptian artifacts dating to this era have been found in Canaan and other regions of the Near East, including Tell Brak and Uruk and Susa in Mesopotamia.

Lapis lazuli trade, in the form of beads, from its only known prehistoric source – Badakshan, in northeastern Afghanistan – reached ancient Gerzeh.

By the first half of the 4th millennium BC, predynastic Egyptians in Maadi were importing pottery from Canaan.

== Early Dynastic (c. 3100–2575 BC) ==
Evidence of Early Dynastic contacts are basically a continuation of the predynastic above with further extensions into Sudan. There are also some indications of contact with the Aegean and Crete in this period, but this evidence is weak.

Narmer had Egyptian pottery produced in southern Canaan – with his name stamped on vessels – and then exported back to Egypt. Production sites included Arad, En Besor, Rafiah, and Tel Erani. An Egyptian colony that was stationed in southern Canaan dates to this same era. As the largest Egyptian settlement in the area, it is likely that Tell es-Sakan served as the administrative centre for the Egyptian settlements. First Dynasty Egyptian pottery has been found in southern Canaan, some bearing the name of Narmer.

Other reflections of ancient Near Eastern contact particularly include a design of a flint knife.

== Old Kingdom (before c. 2134 BC) ==
Evidence of Old Kingdom trade (external map here) extends southward to Nubia (in modern Sudan and Ethiopia) and Punt (probably modern Ethiopia/Eritrea or the Eritreo-Sudanese borderlands, possibly Somalia), eastward to the Near East (Byblos and Ebla, Syria), northward to the Aegean and the Greek islands, and westward (limited evidence) with Libya.

The Darb el-Arbain trade route, passing through Kharga in the south and Asyut in the north, was used from as early as the Old Kingdom for the transport and trade of gold, ivory, spices, wheat, animals and plants.

== Middle Kingdom (before c. 1648 BC) ==
Evidence of Middle Kingdom contacts (external map here) reaches southward to Nubia, in particular Buhen and Kerma. Nubians also lived in ancient Egypt in this period.

Eastward contacts are represented by objects and motific works of ancient Egypt found in the Near East, including modern Anatolia and Byblos and those ancient regions around Canaan and Syria. Some kings of Byblos have been found buried with Egyptian items.

Westward, evidence of contact with Libya is generally limited to military expeditions.

Northward, evidence of contact with the Aegean includes Minoan relics found in Egypt.

== New Kingdom (before c. 1070 BC) ==
New Kingdom contacts (everywhere except Greece) seem to have been dominated by military activities. Strong northerly contacts with Crete, Mycenea and the Helladic (on the Aegean islands) seem to have persisted during this time. Southward, Egypt conquered Nubia.

Eastward, the Egyptians successfully conquered the ancient regions of Palestine and Syria, being opposed by the Mitanni and the Hittites. Although, limited trade between the regions seems to have continued, culminating in the world's earliest known peace treaty, between Ramesses II and the Hittites.

Westward, contact with Libya is again generally limited to military activities.

== Late Period (before c. 343 BC) ==
Foreign contacts in the Late Period of ancient Egypt seem to have been mere extensions of those of the New Kingdom. Military expeditions again persist, everywhere but in ancient Greece. In fact, there is in this period evidence of Greek soldiers fighting for Egyptian pharaohs and the establishment of a Greek trading post, called Naucratis, within Egypt.

Nubia would become dominated by ancient Egypt in this period. Eventually, however, by the 25th Dynasty, Nubia conquers and controls Egypt, only themselves to become later ousted by the Assyrians. Further, some scholars believe the Assyrians were then later driven out by the Napatans.

Described by Herodotus as a road "traversed ... in forty days," the Darb el-Arbain trade route became by his time an important land route facilitating trade between Nubia and Egypt.

Eastward, Egypt gained control over Cyprus but, despite numerous attempts, never over Palestine.

Again Libyan contacts in this era are generally limited to military activities.
