= Naqada =

Naqada نقادة
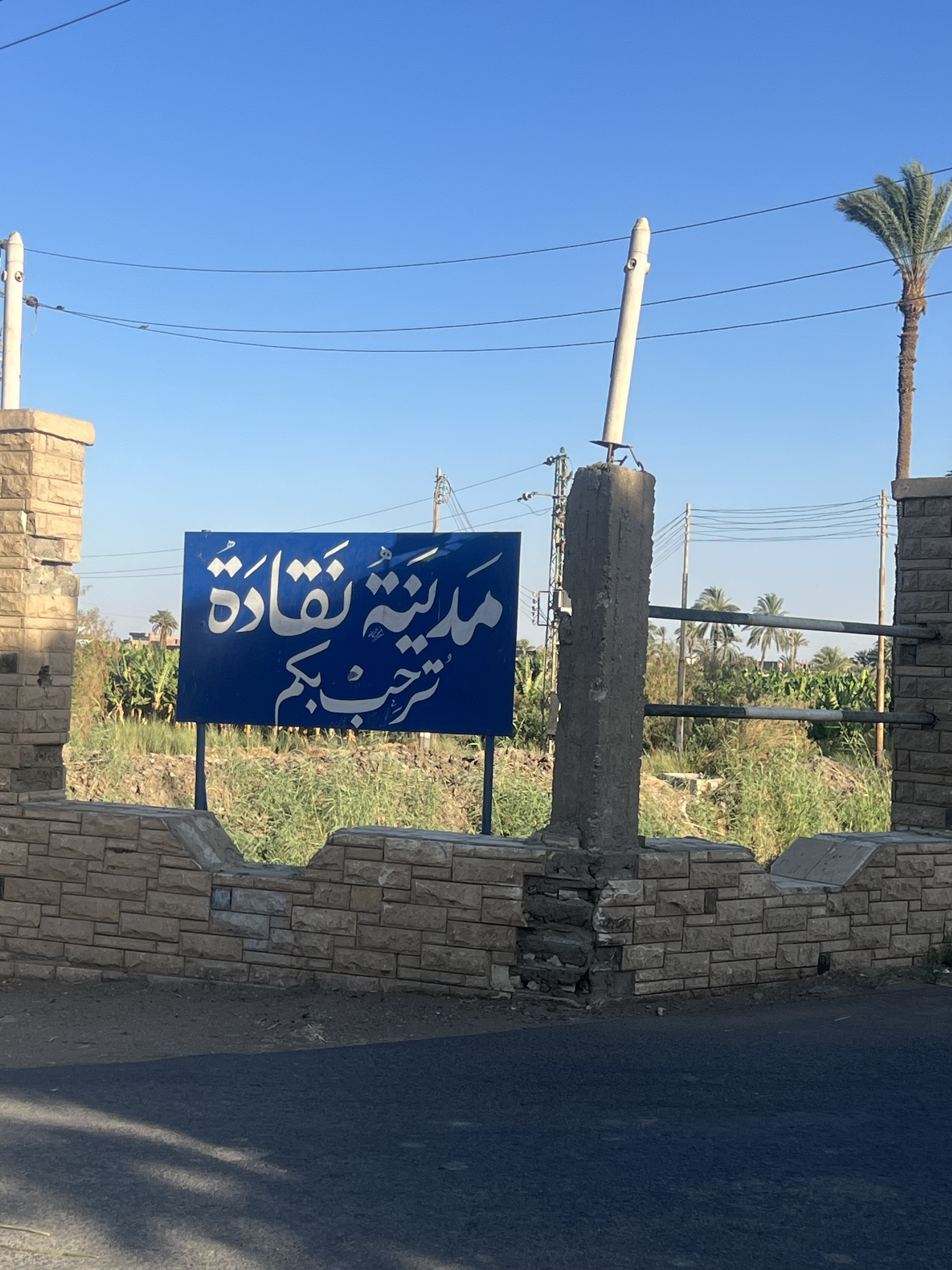

- Location in Egypt
- Coordinates: 25°54′N 32°43′E
- Country: Egypt
- Governorate: Qena

Area
  - Total: 35.94 sq mi (93.08 km^{2})

Population (2021)
  - Total: 188,984
  - Density: 5,259/sq mi (2,030/km^{2})
- Time zone: UTC+2 (EET)
  - Summer (DST): UTC+3 (EEST)

S13 i i t niwt
nbyt
in hieroglyphs
Era: Middle Kingdom
(2055–1650 BC)

Naqada (Egyptian Arabic: نقادة Naqāda; Coptic language: ⲛⲉⲕⲁⲧⲏⲣⲓⲟⲛ Nekatērion; Ancient Greek: Παμπανις Pampanis, Ancient Egyptian: Nbyt "City of Gold") is a town on the west bank of the Nile in Qena Governorate, Egypt, situated ca. 20 km north of Luxor. It includes the villages of Tukh, Khatara, Danfiq, and Zawayda. According to the 1960 census, it is one of the most sparsely populated areas and had only 3,000 inhabitants, mostly of the Christian faith who preserved elements of the Coptic language up until the 1930s.

The ancient town contained a cemetery that held approximately 2,000 graves. The first person to excavate the site was archaeologist Sir Flinders Petrie in 1894. Petrie was working for the Egypt Exploration Fund (now the Egypt Exploration Society) when he excavated the site. Some of the findings during the excavation included artifacts from the Amratian (Naqada I) and the Gerzeh (Naqada II).

== Archaeology ==
"Naqada" (Nubt) meaning "City of Gold," reflects the exceptional wealth of the eastern desert region in gold as well as the strategic position of Naqada and its facing town of Koptos for the commerce of that gold. The exploitation of precious metals from the Eastern Desert, and the development of floodplain agriculture generating surpluses which could generate demand for a variety of crafts, made the region especially advanced in terms of economic specialization and diversification, much more so than the regions of contemporary Lower Egypt.

Naqada stands near the site of a prehistoric Egyptian necropolis: The town, called Ombos, was the centre of the cult of Set and large tombs were built there 3500 BCE.

The large quantity of remains from Naqada has enabled the dating of the entire archeological period throughout Egypt and its environs, hence the town name Naqada is used for the pre-dynastic Naqada culture c. 4400–3000 BCE. Other Naqada culture archeological sites include el Badari, the Gerzeh culture, and Nekhen.

=== Excavations ===
Naqada and its culture was originally discovered by Sir Williams Matthew Flinders Petrie. Petrie's initial findings during his excavations led him to incorrectly believe he had found a new race of people who had invaded Egypt during the First Intermediate Period. This would later be disproven by the work of Jacques de Morgan who had conducted his own digs in the Naqada Region. Morgan's findings showed that the artifacts came from an earlier era and this led Petrie to revise his own findings.

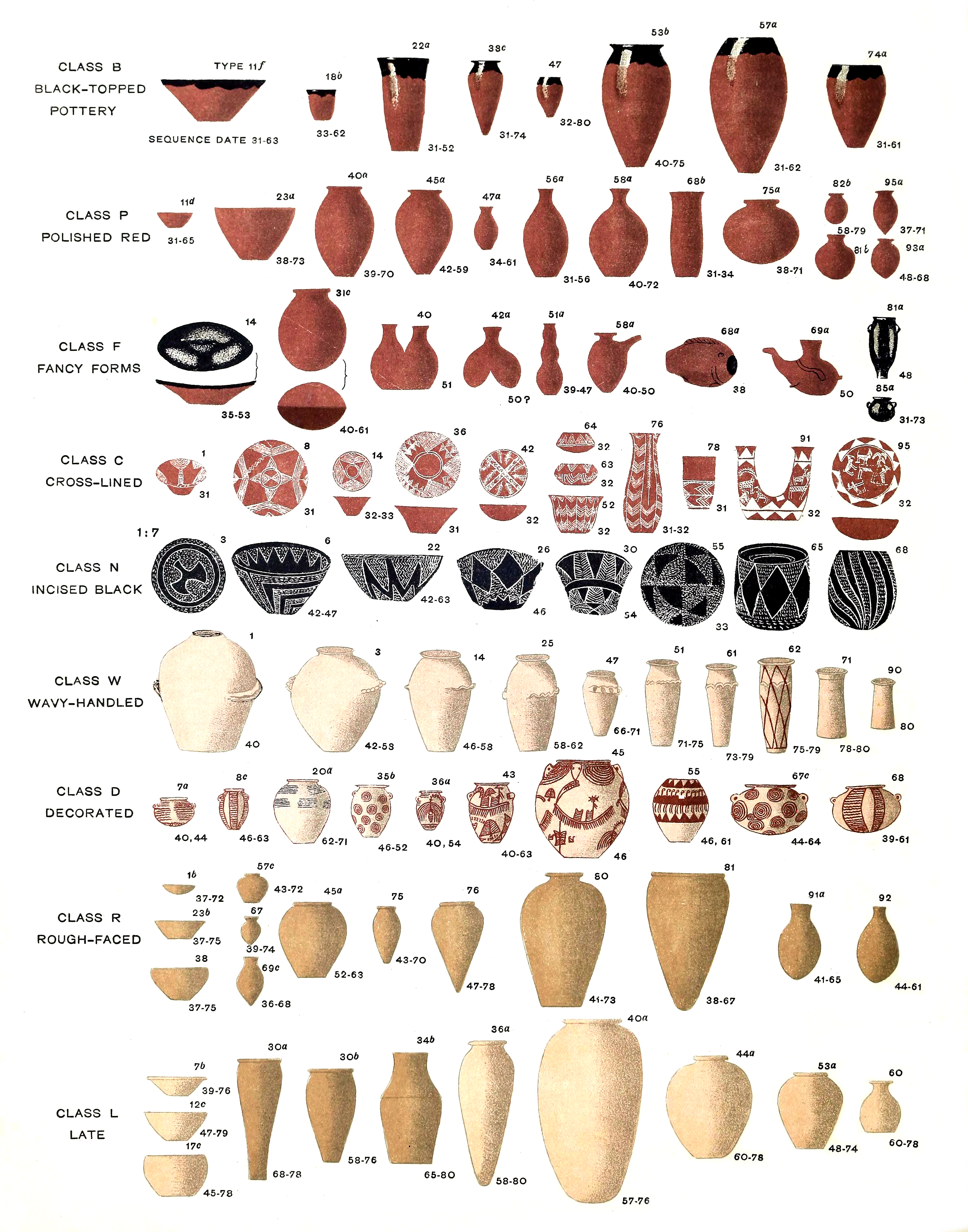
Example of Petrie's pottery classification system

The graves that were uncovered contained bodies that were less intact and were placed by streams and in covered pits compared to the Egyptian practice of usually placing the graves on a cliff face or rising ground and having the bodies lie in a hollow or a cave and they lacked the embalming typical of Egyptian burials.

"Unlike the Lower Egyptian culture sites, much of the Naqada culture evidence is from cemeteries, and settlements have been poorly preserved or buried under later alluvium or villages".

Research into the predynastic sites of the dead in the Naqada region came to show that they had transitioned into a state style of civilization and away from a chiefdom. Many of these graves had contained many items ranging from amulets to hairpins to knives made of flint. Few of these graves had items of value or were of special use which tells us that they had a developing class of people who resided within the upper class including an established group of middle class individuals. This level of monetary stability is thought to have come from the region having an established gold trade as revealed by seals found in cemeteries.

A survey of the area in the years between 1978 and 1981, led by Fekri Hassan, working with the Washington State University in a project titled Predynastic of Naqada was done in an attempt to find more cemetery sites. This project did lead to the discovery of more cemeteries. This survey also led to the rediscovery of the Royal Tomb that was found by de Morgan which was then later re-evaluated. Through the survey the area of Nubt, in the south town, was found to have been looted and used by the farmers in the area as a form of fertilizer called Sebakh. The objects that were left behind had been moved from their original location or were sold on the black market.

=== Proposed future surveys ===
In August 2018 the Egypt Exploration Society had conducted tests in the area of Nubt to test for its ability to be used for further research. The purpose of this survey is to bring more attention to the usefulness of the site and for protecting it. Later seasons will take looks into how to best preserve the sites. Further work will begin on the surrounding area. A more recent return to the site includes a new digital map of the excavations of Naqada. Petrie's orginal map of the sites and excavations was simply one map that documented over 2,000 tombs. Many of these tombs were left unnumbered, which has left the opportunity to match available evidence from earlier excavations of the site in order to create a more accurate digital map that more accurately labels important factors of the site.

== In popular culture ==
In the Stargate franchise, alien civilizations make extensive use of a mineral, naquada, named after the archaeological site.

== Gallery ==
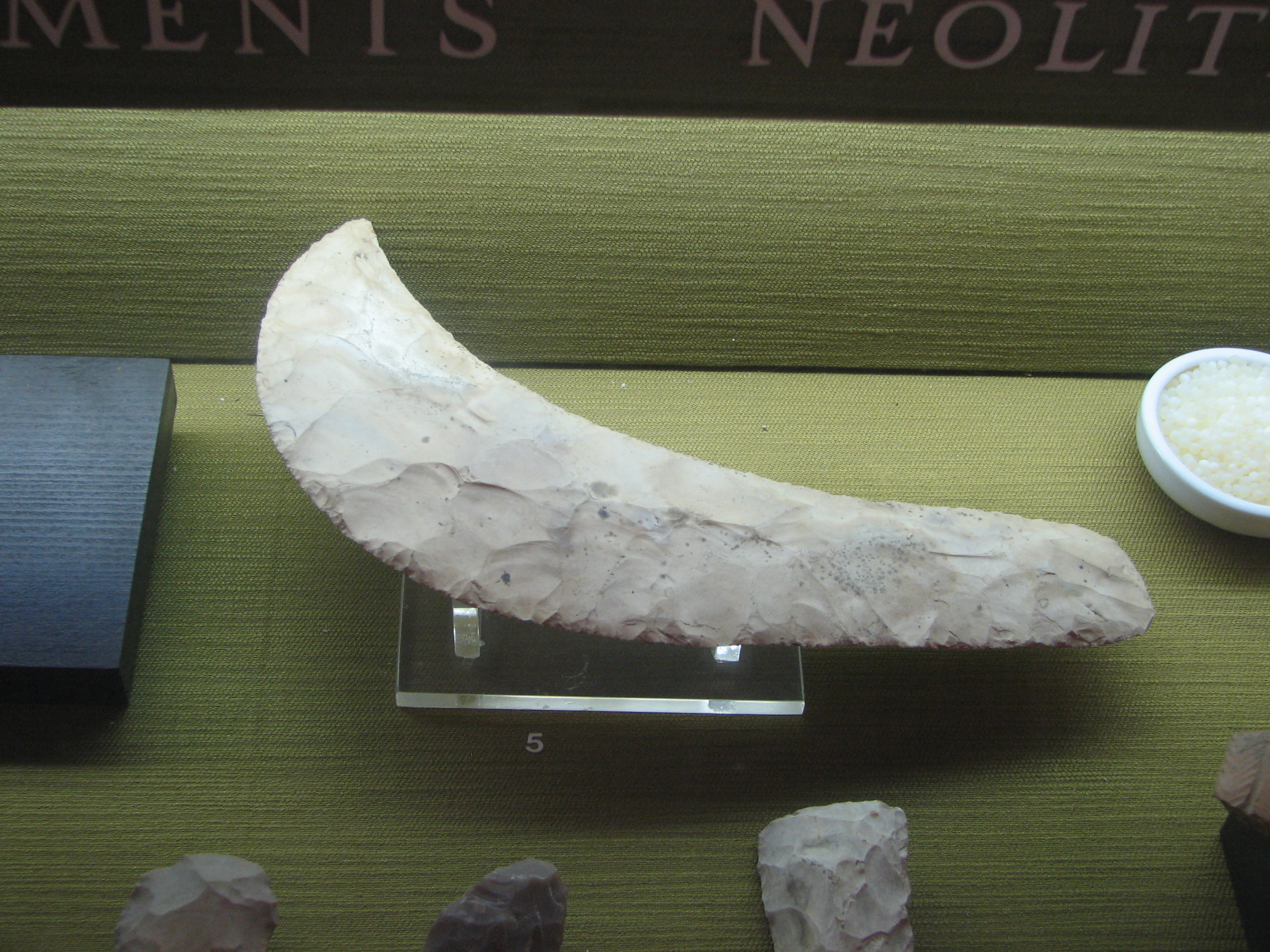
Sickle made of flint, Egypt, Naqada period, end of the fourth millennium BCE, Dagon Museum, Haifa

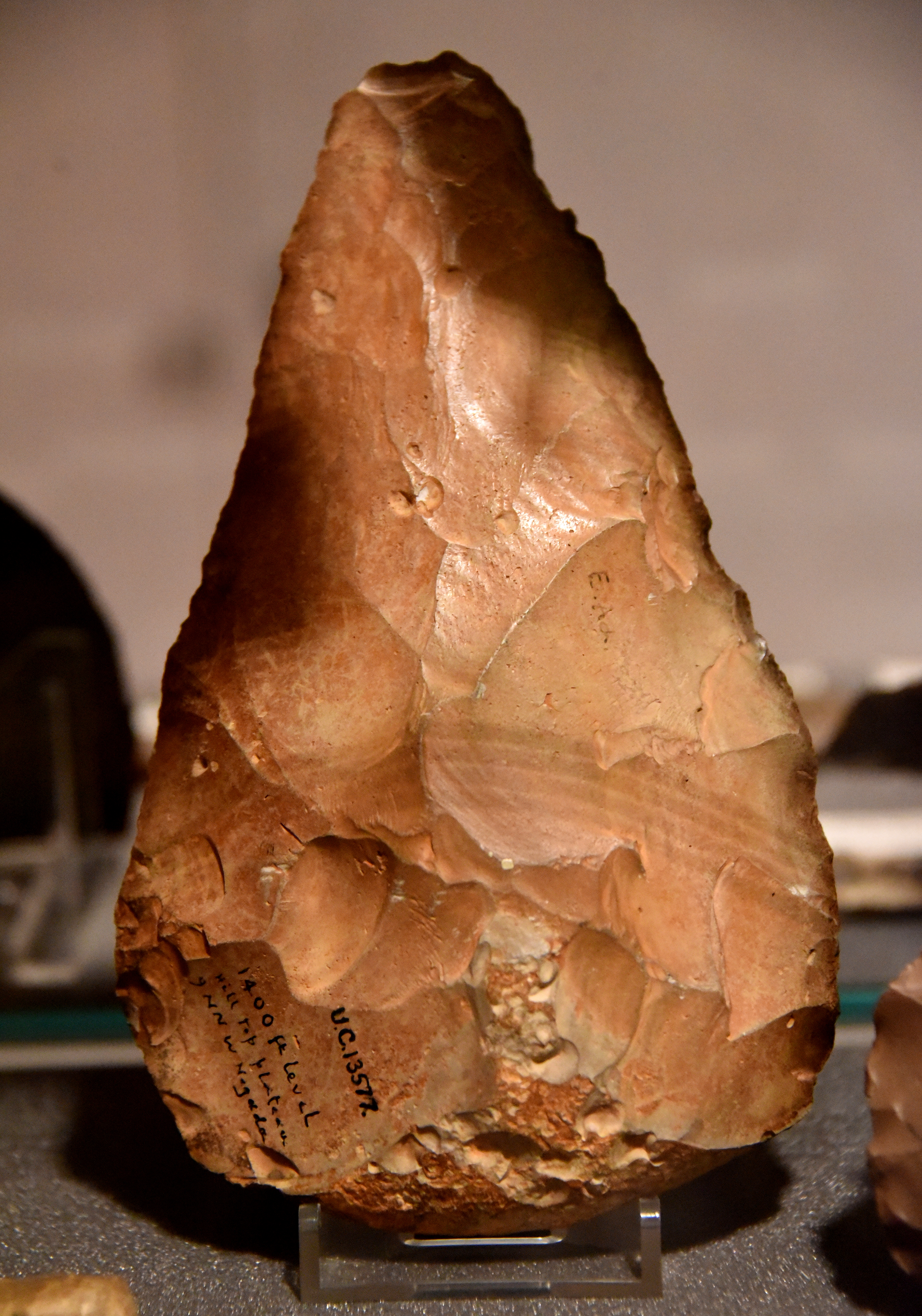
Acheulean hand-axe from Egypt. Found on a hilltop plateau, 1400 feet above sea level, 9 miles NNW of the city of Naqada, Egypt. Paleolithic. The Petrie Museum of Egyptian Archaeology, London

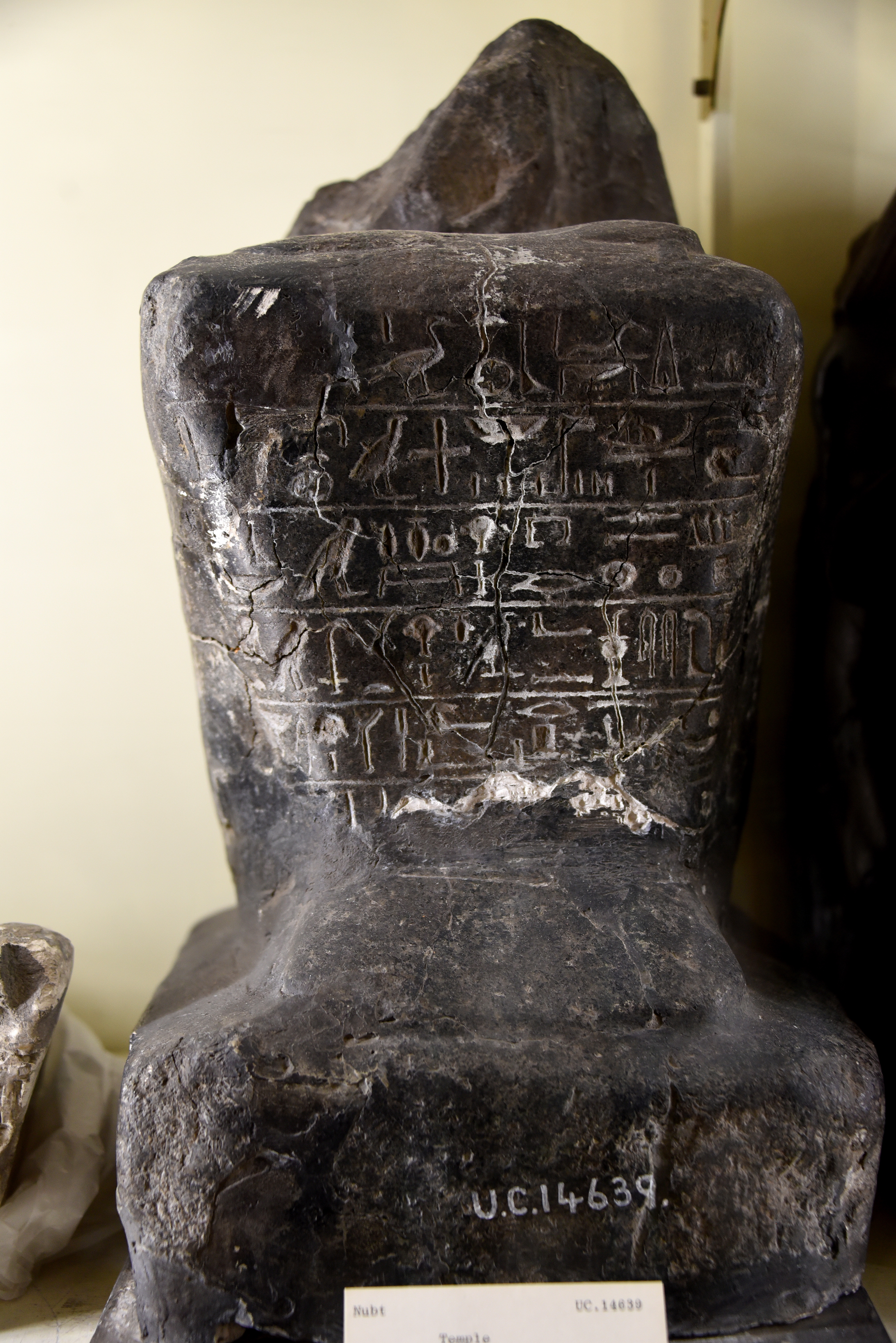
Black granite, seated statue of Sennefer with cartouche of Amenhotep II (Amenophis) on right arm. From the temple of Seth at Naqada, Egypt. The Petrie Museum of Egyptian Archaeology, London

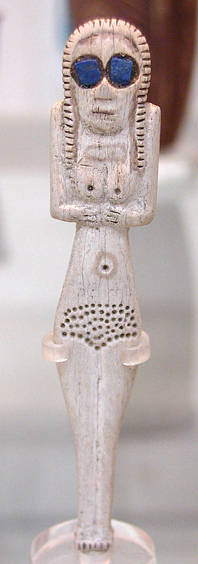
Naqada I bone figure with lapis lazuli inlays (the inlays are a modern addition). British Museum

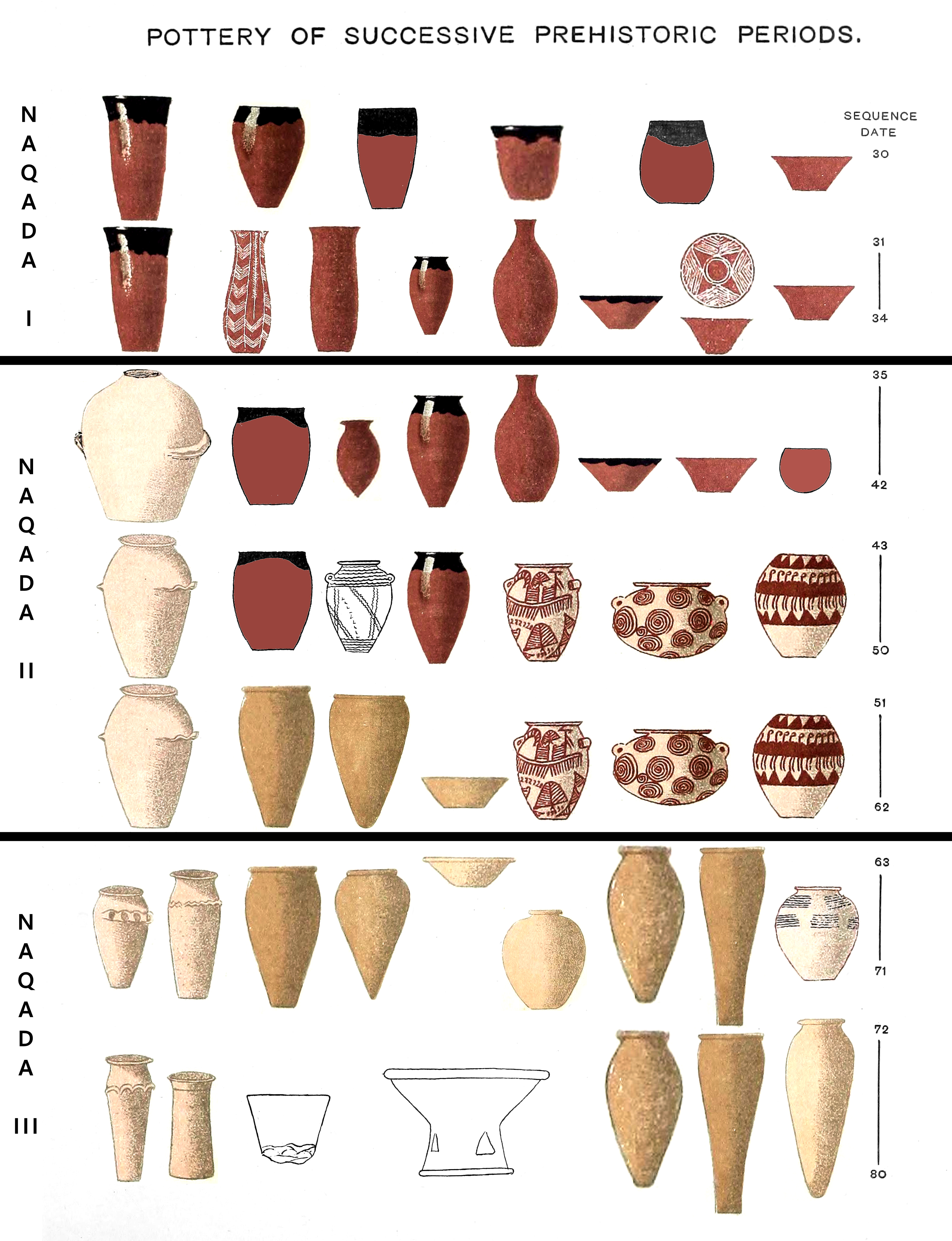
Evolution of Egyptian prehistoric pottery styles, from Naqada I to Naqada II and Naqada III

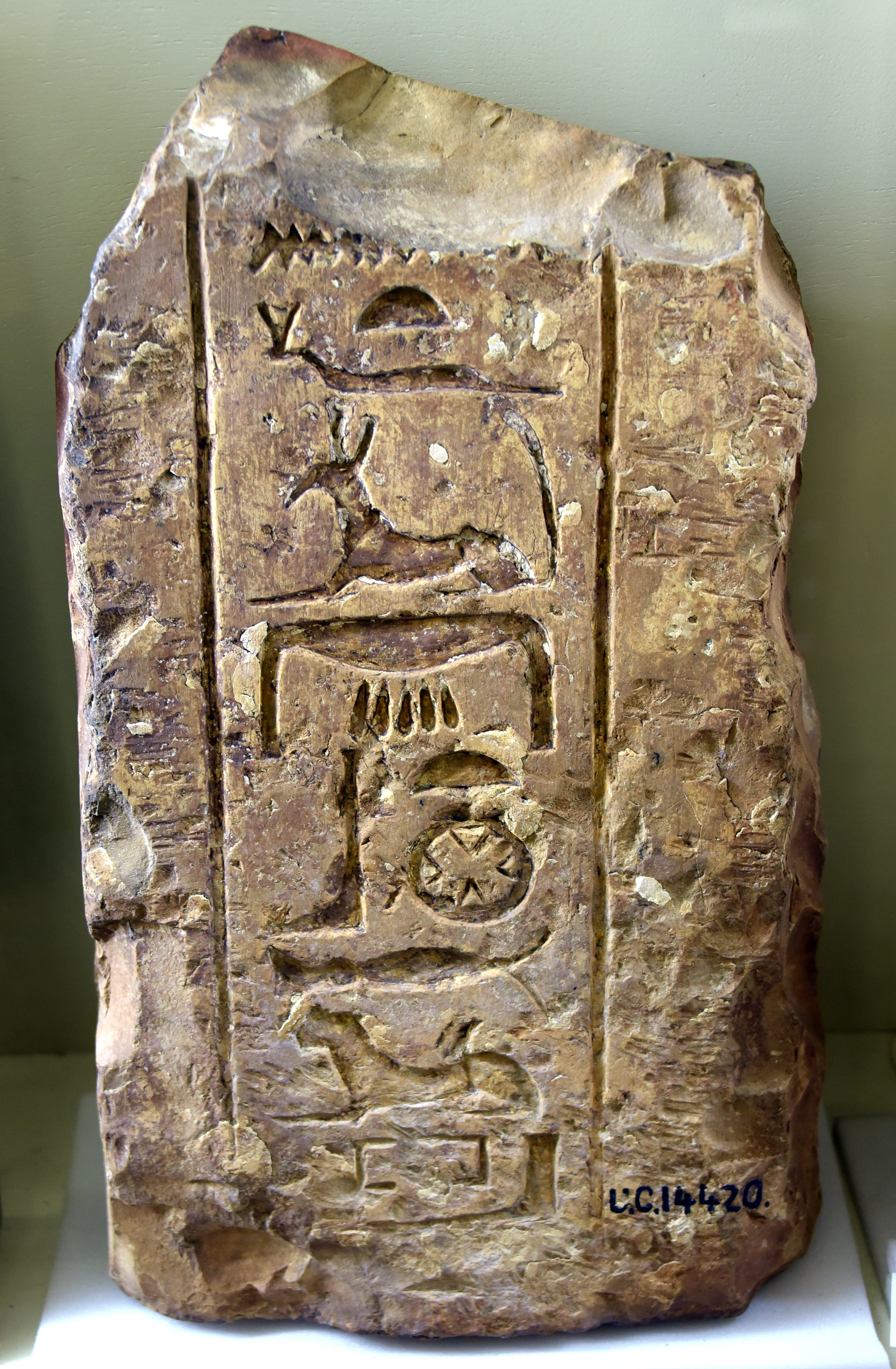
Limestone architectural fragment. A door jamb, part of a doorway. From the temple of Seth (which was built by Thutmosis III) at Naqada, Egypt. 18th Dynasty. Petrie Museum

== See also ==
- List of cities and towns in Egypt
- Amratian culture
- Badarian culture
- Naqada culture
- Ifri N'Ammar
- Kelif el Boroud
- Kulubnarti
- Luxmanda
