= Sebakh =

Arabic word

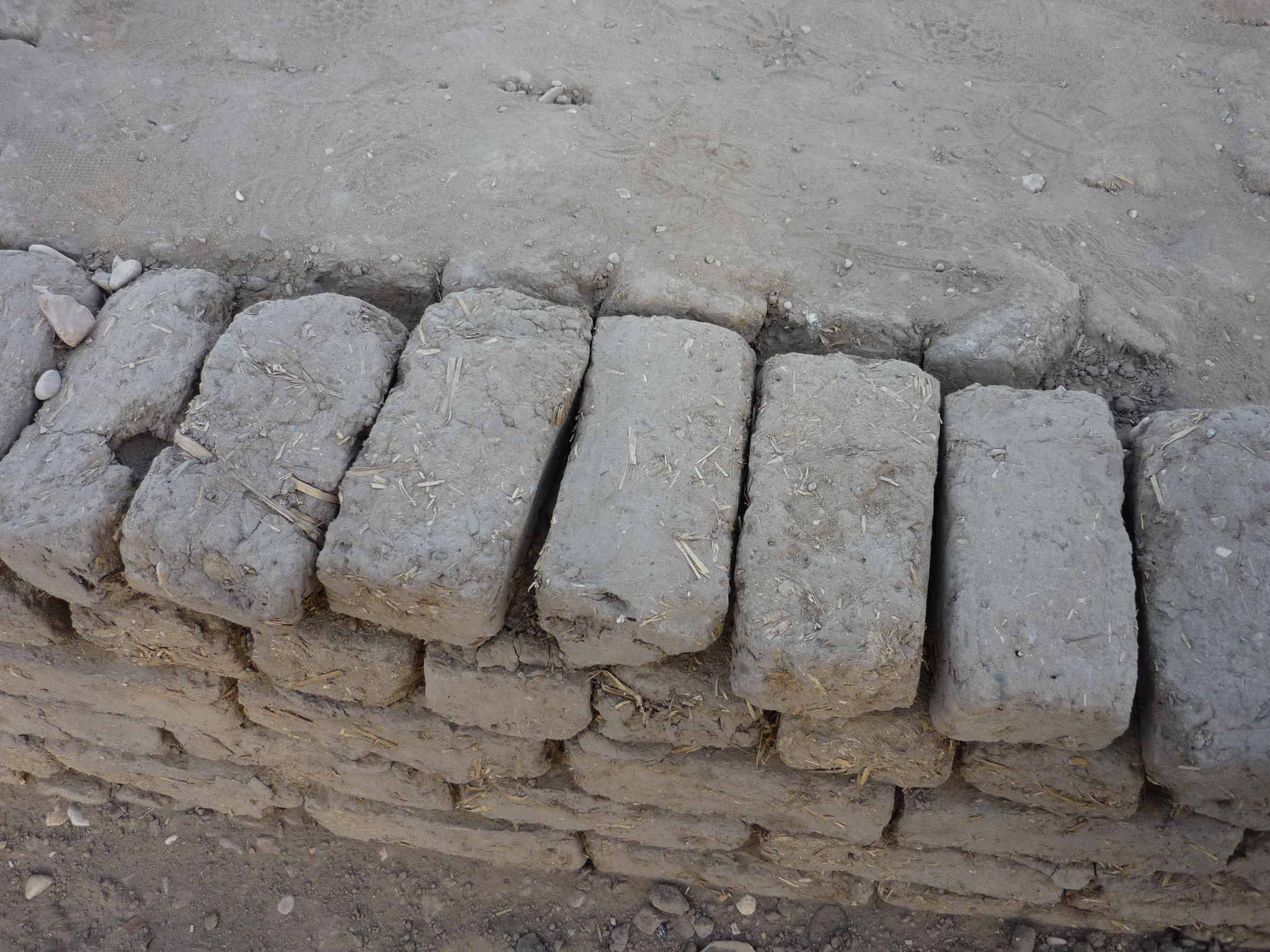
30th Dynasty mudbricks excavated in Luxor. Ancient mudbricks are a common source of sebakh.

Sebakh (Arabic: سباخ, romanized: sabākh, less commonly transliterated as sebbakh) is an Arabic word that translates to "fertilizer". In English, the term is primarily used to describe decomposed mudbricks from archaeological sites, which is an organic material that can be employed both as an agricultural fertilizer and as a fuel for fires.

== Composition ==
Most sebakh consists of ancient, deteriorated mudbrick, a primary building material in ancient Egypt. This material is composed of ancient mud mixed with the nitrous compost of the hay and stubble that the bricks were originally formulated with to give added strength before being baked in the sun.

== Affecting archaeology ==
A common practice in Egypt, in the late nineteenth and early twentieth century, was for farmers to obtain government permits to remove this material from ancient mounds; such farmers were known as sebakhin. Mounds indicating the location of ancient cities are also known as a tell, or tel.

An archaeological site could provide an excellent source of sebakh because decomposed organic debris creates a soil very rich in nitrogen. Nitrogen is an essential component in fertilizers used for plant crops.

Numerous potentially valuable archaeological finds were destroyed by farmers in this way. Sebakh digging also led to the discovery of archaeological finds that might otherwise have gone undetected.

== Amarna ==
Sebakh is most commonly associated with the finding of the site of Amarna (Arabic: العمارنة, romanized: al-ʿAmārna). In 1887, a local inhabitant who was delving into sebakh deposits accidentally discovered more than 300 cuneiform tablets that turned out to be pharaonic records of correspondence. These tablet letters, known as the Amarna Letters, have provided much valuable historical and chronological data, as well as information bearing on Egyptian diplomatic relations with her neighbors at that time.
