= Emirate of Banu Talis =

Hawwara dynasty

- 1228–1551
- Capital: Bani Walid
- Religion: Islam
- History
  - Established: 1228
  - Disestablished: 1551
- Today part of: Libya

Banu Talis was a Hawwara Berber dynasty, which appeared in Libya in 1228 and established the city of Bani Walid as its capital.

== Rise ==
The dynasty was founded by the scholar Sheikh Ahmed bin Muhammad bin Ali bin Abdullah bin Al-Rashid bin Talis Al-Abdari Al-Qayrawani.

Stories differ about the reason behind Ibn Talis' exodus to Tripoli. Some sources claim that Abd al-Dar took refuge there after fleeing a dispute that occurred between him and some scholars of Kairouan who conspired with the Sultan against him. He and those with him fled across the sea to Tripoli. Other sources claim that he was assigned to Tripoli by the ruling Hafsid dynasty.

Ibn Talis arrived in Wadi Bani Walid in 1228. The Hawwara Berber and Hilali Arab residents of the region gathered around him (perhaps due to his noble Qurashi lineage). He became a major force in the country.

He made several reforms in the region. He dug between 300 and 360 wells, and built several palaces, including the famous "Ibn Talis Palace", as the seat of his power.

He built several zawiyas and the emirate flourished during his reign. Trade, agriculture, and pottery makingspread, and prominent scholars appeared, whose fame spread throughout North Africa and Sub-Saharan Sudan. These included Sheikh "Abdul Salam al-Fitouri", known as "Abdul Salam al-Asmar", to whom students come from many countries.

== Fall ==
The emirate suffered from invasion more than once, beginning with the Spanish invasion in 1510 AD. It targeted the city of Masalata, the cultural capital of the emirate, and the Banu Tellis were able to repel this occupation under the leadership of Sheikh "Abdul Wahid Al-Doukali."

The Ottoman Turkish invasion came during the reign of the last prince, "Ali II", who resisted them for 26 years. Then they invaded in 1603 AD with an army of 10,000 fighters supported by local tribes. The emirate's headquarters in Qasr Bin Talis was destroyed, the city was completely burned, and most of the members of the ruling family were killed. After that an unknowen sheikhdom ruled.
