= Revolutionary Women's Formation =

Libyan women's organization

The Revolutionary Women's Formation (RWF) was a women's organization in Libya, founded in 1970. It was initially called the Women's General Union (WGU), renamed Jamahiriya Women's Federation in 1977, and finally named Revolutionary Women's Formation (RWF).

The first women's organization was founded in Benghazi in 1955. When Muammar Khadaffi took power in 1969, all existing women's groups in Libya were united in one single state controlled women's organization. It was the only women's organisation allowed during the Gaddafi regime. It held its first national congress in 1970. The task of the organization was to unite and mobilize women in the political Jamahiriya policy of the regime. The regime had an officially progressive policy in regard to women: in the Clausus 5 of the Constitutional Proclamation in the 11 December, 1969, women were declared to have the same rights as men. Girls were included in the compulsory school system, women given educational and professional rights, and it became common for women to appear unveiled. However, the progressive policy of the regime was in many aspect merely on paper, especially politically: only six women became members of the Secretary of the People's Congress between 1977 and 2006.
